= List of acronyms: S =

This list contains acronyms, initialisms, and pseudo-blends that begin with the letter S.

For the purposes of this list:

- acronym = an abbreviation pronounced as if it were a word, e.g., SARS = severe acute respiratory syndrome, pronounced to rhyme with cars
- initialism = an abbreviation pronounced wholly or partly using the names of its constituent letters, e.g., CD = compact disc, pronounced cee dee
- pseudo-blend = an abbreviation whose extra or omitted letters mean that it cannot stand as a true acronym, initialism, or portmanteau (a word formed by combining two or more words).

(a) = acronym, e.g.: SARS – (a) severe acute respiratory syndrome
(i) = initialism, e.g.: CD – (i) compact disc
(p) = pseudo-blend, e.g.: UNIFEM – (p) United Nations Development Fund for Women
(s) = symbol (none of the above, representing and pronounced as something else; for example: MHz – megahertz)

Some terms are spoken as either acronym or initialism, e.g., VoIP, pronounced both as voyp and V-O-I-P.

(Main list of acronyms)

- S
  - (s) Siemens
  - South
  - Sulphur/Sulfur

== S0–9 ==
- S followed by a number is used to denote various German and Austrian S-train lines.
- S4C – (i) Sianel Pedwar Cymru (Welsh, "Channel Four Wales")
- S3 - (i) Alternative to SSS (e.g. Amazon S3)

== SA ==
- sa – (s) Sanskrit language (ISO 639-1 code)
- SA
  - (i) Salvation Army
  - (s) Sand (METAR Code)
  - Saudi Arabia (ISO 3166 and FIPS 10-4 country's code digram)
  - (i) Sexaholics Anonymous
  - Sexual assault
  - (i) sine anno (Latin, "without year")
  - Single Adult, a designation in the LDS Church for unmarried individuals 18 and older
  - Situational awareness
  - South Africa
  - (i/s) South Australia (postal symbol)
  - (i) Standards Australia
  - Sturmabteilung (German, "Storm Detachment", Nazi forerunner and rival of SS)
- S.A. – designation for a corporation in many European countries; see article for meanings
- SAA
  - (i) Saudi Arabian Airlines, former name of Saudia
  - Sex Addicts Anonymous
  - South African Airways
  - Southern Athletic Association
  - Standards Association of Australia, a former name of Standards Australia
- SAAB – (a) Svenska Aeroplan AB (Swedish aircraft manufacturer; also refers to its former auto manufacturing arm)
- SAAFR – (a/i) Standard use Army Aircraft Flight Route ("safer")
- SAAMI – (a) Sporting Arms and Ammunition Manufacturers' Institute ("sammy")
- SAARC – (i) South Asian Association for Regional Cooperation
- SAB – (i) Soprano Alto Baritone
- Sabena – (a) Société anonyme belge d'exploitation de la navigation aérienne (French for "Belgian Company for Exploiting Aerial Navigation", 1923–2001)
- SABIC – (p) Saudi Basic Industries Corporation
- SABR – (a) Society for American Baseball Research
- SAC
  - (a) Standards Activity Committee (of SISO)
  - U.S. Strategic Air Command (1946–1992)
- SACAT – (a) Semi Attended Customer Activated Terminal (Supermarket checkout)
- SACEUR – (p) Supreme Allied Commander EURope
- SACF - Semi Automatic Capsule Filler source
- SACLANT – (p) Supreme Allied Commander atLANTic
- SACLOS – (a) Semi-Automatic Command to Line of Sight
- SAD
  - (s) Safford Regional Airport (IATA code)
  - (a) Seasonal Affective Disorder
  - Situational Awareness Display
- SADD – (a) originally Students Against Drunk Driving, now Students Against Destructive Decisions (U.S. national school-related group)
- SADL
  - (a) Situation Awareness Data Link ("saddle")
  - Structural Architecture Description Language
- SADT - (i) Substance Abuse Day Treatment
- SAE
  - (i) Society of Automotive Engineers
  - Stamped addressed envelope
- SAFER – (a) Steel And Foam Energy Reduction
- SAFETY – (a) Stopping Adults Facilitating the Exploitation of Today's Youth
- SAFICT – (a) Software Agents as Facilitators of Interoperability in Collective Training
- sag – (s) Sango language (ISO 639-2 code)
- SAG
  - (a/i) Screen Actors Guild
  - Surface Action Group
- SAG-AFTRA – (a) Screen Actors Guild–American Federation of Television and Radio Artists
- SAGAT – (a) Situation Awareness Global Assessment Technique
- SAGE – (a) Semi-Automatic Ground Environment (simulation)
- SAHB – (a) Sensational Alex Harvey Band
- SAIC – (i) Science Applications International Corporation
- SALT
  - (a/i) Save A Life Today (SALT) Alert; Emergency Contact System
  - (a) Southern African Large Telescope
  - Strategic Arms Limitation Talks
- SAM
  - (a) Sequential-Access Memory
  - Sociedad Aeronáutica de Medellín
  - Surface-to-Air Missile
- Sambo – (p/a) Samooborona bez oruzhiya (Russian: "Самооборона без оружия", literally "self-defense without weapons")
- SAML – (a) Security Assertion Markup Language ("sam-ell")
- SANZAAR – (a) South Africa, New Zealand, Australia and Argentina Rugby
- san
  - (s) Sanskrit language (ISO 639-2 code)
  - (a) Storage Area Network
- SAO - (more than 20 alternatives)
- SAR
  - (s) Saudi riyal (ISO 4217 currency code)
  - (a) Search And Rescue
  - Special Administrative Region
  - Synthetic Aperture Radar
- SARA
  - (a) Southeastern Association for Research in Astronomy
  - Scientific Atlanta Resident Application
  - Scottish Amateur Rowing Association
  - Southern African Railway Association
  - State Administration for Religious Affairs
- SARP – (a) Search And Rescue Processor
- SARR – (i/a) Search And Rescue Repeater
- SARS – (a) Severe Acute Respiratory Syndrome
- SART
  - (a) Search and Rescue Transponder
  - Situational Awareness Rating Technique
- SARU – (i) South African Rugby Union
- SAS
  - (i) Scandinavian Airlines System
  - Second Avenue Subway
  - Situational Awareness System
  - Special Air Service
  - Studies, Analysis and Simulation
  - Side Angle Side
  - (a) Statistical Analysis System (original meaning; SAS Institute Inc. has evolved far beyond that scope)
- SASE – (i) Self-Addressed Stamped Envelope
- SASO – (a) Stability and Support Operations
- SASOL – (p) Suid Afrikaanse Steenkool en Oli.e. (Afrikaans, "South African Coal and Oil")
- SAT
  - (i) formerly Scholastic Aptitude Test and Scholastic Assessment Test; now known solely by the initials
  - Small Arms Trainer
- SATB – (i) Soprano Alto Tenor bass
- SATNAV – (p) Satellite Navigation (Increasingly common GPS based system in new vehicles)
- SATs – (a) Standard Assessment Tasks and other similar terms describing tests used in English schools; see National Curriculum assessment#Terminology
- SAU – (s) Saudi Arabia (ISO 3166 trigram)
- SAVAK – (a) Sazamane Etelaat va Amniate Kechvar (Iranian "Security and Intelligence Service")
- SAW
  - (i) ṣallā -llāhu ʿalayhī (wa-ʾālihī) wa-sallama (Arabic: صَلَّىٰ ٱللَّٰهُ عَلَيْهِ وَآلِهِ وَسَلَّمَ, "God bless him [and his family] and grant him peace"), an honorific suffix within Islam for Muhammad
  - (a) Submerged arc welding
  - Squad Automatic Weapon
  - Surface acoustic wave
- SAWE – (a) Society of Allied Weight Engineers
- SAWS – (i) alternate form of the Islamic honorific suffix for Muhammad (see SAW)

== SB ==
- Sb – (s) Antimony (Latin Stibium)
- SbA - Stibarsen, an alloy of antimony and arsenic
- SB
  - (i) Sexy Bitch
  - Sexy Bastard
  - Sexy Boy (disambiguation)
  - (s) Solomon Islands (ISO 3166 digram)
  - (i) Special Warfare Boat Operator
- SBA
  - (i) Santa Barbara Airport
  - Simulation-Based Acquisition
  - Small Business Administration
  - Sovereign Base Area
  - Student bar association
- SBB – (i) German for the Swiss Federal Railways
- SBC
  - (i) Sensotronic Brake Control
  - Single-Board Computer
  - Southern Baptist Convention
  - Sun Belt Conference (US college sports)
- SBCCOM – (p) U.S. Army Soldier and Biological Chemical Command (disbanded 2003)
- SBCS – (i) Single-Byte Character Set
- SBCT – (i) Stryker Brigade Combat Team
- SBD
  - (s) Solomon Islands dollar (ISO 4217 currency code)
  - Silent But Deadly
- SBP
  - (i) Samahang Basketbol ng Pilipinas (Filipino, "Basketball Federation of the Philippines")
  - U.S. School Breakfast Program
  - Society of Business Practitioners
  - State Bank of Pakistan
- SBS
  - (i) Special Boat Service
  - Special Broadcasting Service
  - Seoul Broadcasting System
- SBW
  - (i) Sonny Bill Williams (New Zealand dual-code rugby player)

== SC ==
- sc – (s) Sardinian language (ISO 639-1 code)
- Sc – (s) Scandium
- SC
  - (s) Cruiser Submarine (US Navy hull classification) c Saint Kitts and Nevis (FIPS 10-4 country code; from Saint Christopher)
  - Seychelles (ISO 3166 digram)
  - South Carolina (postal symbol)
- SCA
  - (i) Service Contract Act
  - Sexual Compulsives Anonymous
  - Society for Creative Anachronism
- SCAP – (a) Supreme Commander Allied Powers (Allied occupation of Japan)
- sccm – (s) Standard cubic centimetre per minute (unit of measurement of fluid flow)
- sccs – (s) Standard cubic centimetre per second (unit of measurement of fluid flow)
- scfh – (s) Standard cubic foot per hour (unit of measurement of fluid flow)
- scfm – (s) Standard cubic foot per minute (unit of measurement of fluid flow)
- scfs – (s) Standard cubic foot per second (unit of measurement of fluid flow)
- SCG – (s) Serbia and Montenegro (ISO 3166 trigram; defunct since 2006)
- SCHIMS – (i) Soldier Combat Helmet Identification Marking System
- SCHIP – (a) State Children's Health Insurance Program (U.S.; often pronounced "ess-chip")
- SciFi – Science Fiction
- sCJD – (i) Sporadic Creutzfeldt–Jakob disease
- SCM – (i) Surface Contamination Module
- SCMODS – (s) State, County, Municipal Offender Data System
- SCN – (p) Suprachiasmatic Nucleus
- SCNT – (i) Somatic Cell Nuclear Transfer
- SCO
  - (i) Santa Cruz Operation (initials later used by SCO Group)
  - (s) Scotland (FIFA trigram; not eligible for an ISO 3166 or IOC trigram)
  - (a) Shanghai Cooperation Organisation
- SCOTUS – (a) Supreme Court of the United States
- SCR – (s) Seychelles rupee (ISO 4217 currency code)
- SCRAM – (a) Safety Control Rod Axe Man
- SCS
  - (i) Scan Correlated Shift
  - Soil Conservation Service
- SCSI
  - (a) Small Computer System Interface ("scuzzy")
  - (i) Strategic and Combat Studies Institute
- SCT – (s) Scattered Sky (METAR Code)
- SCTP – (i) Stream Control Transmission Protocol
- Scuba – (a) Self Contained Underwater Breathing Apparatus
- SCUF – Slow Continuous Ultrafiltration
- SCUFN – (i) Sub-Committee on Undersea Feature Names (of GEBCO)

== SD ==
- sd – (s) Sindhi language (ISO 639-1 code)
- SD
  - (i) Secure Digital (memory card format)
  - Sheriff's department
  - Smoke/Decontamination
  - (s) South Dakota (postal symbol)
  - Sudan (ISO 3166 digram)
- SDC
  - (i) Shaft Driven Compressor
  - U.S. Army Strategic Defense Command (1985–1992)
- SDG – (s) Sudanese pound (ISO 4217 currency code)
- SDG – (i) Sum Dum Goy - greasy spoon chinese restaurant
- SDH – (i) Synchronous Digital Hierarchy
- SDHC – (i) Secure Digital High Capacity
- SDHL - (i/p) Svenska damhockeyligan (Swedish, "Swedish Women's Hockey League")
- SDI – see entry
- SDN – (s) Sudan (ISO 3166 trigram)
- SDO – (i) Scattered Disc Object
- SDP – (i) Social Democratic Party (European politics)
- SDR – (i) Strategic Defence Review
- SDRAM – (i) Synchronous Dynamic Random-Access Memory ("ess-dee-ram")
- SDS – (i) Students for a Democratic Society
- SDSS – (i) Sloan Digital Sky Survey
- SDXC – (p) Secure Digital eXtended Capacity

== SE ==
- se – (s) Northern Sami language (ISO 639-1 code)
- Se – (s) Selenium
- SE
  - (s) Seychelles (FIPS 10-4 country code)
  - (i) Societas Europaea (form of business organization in the EU)
  - South-east
  - (s) Sweden (ISO 3166 digram)
  - (i) Synthetic Environment
  - Systems engineering
- SEAD – (i) Suppression of Enemy Air Defence(s)
- SEADI – (i) Senior Executioner of Approved Driving Instructors
- SEAFDEC – (p) Southeast Asian Fisheries Development Center
- SEAL – (p) SEa-Air-Land
- SEAT – (a) Sociedad Española de Automóviles de Turismo (Spanish for "Spanish Touring Car Company")
- SEATO – (a) Southeast Asia Treaty Organization
- SeaWiFS – (p) Sea-Viewing Wide Field of View Sensor (satellite instrument)
- SEC
  - (i) U.S. Securities and Exchange Commission
  - (p) Security
  - Southeastern Conference
- SECaaS - (p) Security-as-a-Service
- SECAM – (a) Séquentiel couleur à mémoire (French for "Colour Sequential with Memory"; TV standard, cf. NTSC, PAL)
- SECDEF – (p) (U.S.) Secretary of Defense
- SED – (i) CERDEC Software Engineering Directorate
- SEDRIS – (a) Synthetic Environment Data Representation and Interchange Specification
- SEE – (a) Small Emplacement Excavator
- SEG – (i) Society of Exploration Geophysicists
- SEG – (i) Special Escort Group
- SEK – (s) Swedish krona (ISO 4217 currency code)
- Selkent – (p) South East London & Kent Bus Company
- SELT – (a) Single Ended Line Test (ing)
- SEM
  - (i/a) Sensor Employment Manager
  - Switch to Email Mode, i.e. stop texting as it is more disruptive by making a sound or vibrating and email instead, for a given time
- SEN
  - (s) Senegal (ISO 3166 trigram)
  - (i) Small Extension Node
- SEP
  - (i) Somebody Else's Problem
  - Spherical Error Probable
  - System Enhancement Package
  - System Engineering Plan
- SEPTA – (i) Southeastern Pennsylvania Rapid-Transit Authority
- SERE – (i) Survival, Evasion, Resistance and Escape
- SESSPE – (a) Submarine Escape and Surface Survival Personnel Equipment
- SET – (p) Staphylococcal EnteroToxin
- SETI – (a) Search for ExtraTerrestrial Intelligence
- SETAC – (a) Society for Environmental Toxicology and Chemistry
- SEU
  - (i) Single Event Upset (solid state physics)
  - Slightly Enriched Uranium
  - Special Evidence Unit

== SF ==
- SF
  - (s) Fleet Submarine (retired US Navy hull classification)
  - (i) San Francisco
  - Science fiction
  - (s) South Africa (FIPS 10-4 country code)
  - (i) Speculative fiction
  - Special forces
- SFA
  - (i) Sales force automation
  - Saturated fatty acid
  - Scottish Football Association
  - Stephen F. Austin (State University)
  - Sudan Football Association
- SFE
  - (i) Supercritical fluid extraction
  - Sydney Futures Exchange
- SFF – (i) Standard File Format
- sf&f – (i) Science fiction & fantasy
- SFIO
  - (i) French Section of the Workers' International (former party)
  - (i) Serious Fraud Investigation Office (India)
- SFM – Switch to Facebook Mode, i.e. to message someone on Facebook instead of texting as it is less disruptive in the sense of the phone not making sound or vibrating, for a period of time
- SFOB – (i) Special Forces Operations Base
- SFOR – (p) UN Stabilisation Force (in Bosnia and Herzegovina)
- SFU – (i) Simon Fraser University (Canada)

== SG ==
- sg – (s) Sango language (ISO 639-1 code)
- Sg – (s) Seaborgium
- SG
  - (s) Senegal (FIPS 10-4 country code)
  - Singapore (ISO 3166 digram)
  - Snow Grains (METAR Code)
  - (i) Study Group
- SGC
  - (i) Server Gated Cryptography
  - (p) Stargate Command
- SGD – (s) Singapore dollar (ISO 4217 currency code)
- SGML – (i) Standard Generalized Markup Language
- SGP – (s) Singapore (ISO 3166 trigram)
- SGS
  - (s) South Georgia and the South Sandwich Islands (ISO 3166 trigram)
  - (i) Svalbard Ground Station (Landsat)
  - Société Générale de Surveillance

== SH ==
- SH
  - (s) Saint Helena (ISO 3166 digram)
  - (p) SONATRACH (Algerian petroleum company)
  - Shanghai
- SHAC
  - (a) Stop Huntingdon Animal Cruelty
- SHAPE – (a) Supreme Headquarters Allied Powers Europe
- SHF – (i) Super High Frequency
- SHN – (s) Saint Helena (ISO 3166 trigram)
- SHO – (a) Showtime (see also sho.com)
- SHOALS – (a) Scanning Hydrographic Operational Airborne Lidar Survey
- SHORAD – (p) Short Range Air Defence
- SHORADEZ – (p) SHORAD Engagement Zone
- SHP – (s) Saint Helena pound (ISO 4217 currency code)
- SHRA – (s) Rain Showers (METAR Code)
- SHSN – (s) Snow Showers (METAR Code)

== SI ==
- si – (s) Sinhala language (ISO 639-1 code)
- Si – (s) Silicon
- SI
  - (s) Slovenia (ISO 3166 and FIPS 10-4 country code digram)
  - (i) Socialist International
  - Sports Illustrated
  - Système International (French, International System of Units)
- SIA – (s) Singapore Airlines (ICAO code)
- SIA – (i) Survivors of Incest Anonymous
- SIAM – (i) Society for Industrial and Applied Mathematics
- SIC – (a) Standard Industrial Classification
- SICS – (a/i) Swedish Institute of Computer Science
- SIDS – (a) Sudden infant death syndrome
- SIDU – (i) select, insert, delete, update. See Create, read, update and delete
- SIF – (i) Selective Identification Feature
- SIFF – (i) Successor IFF
- SIG
  - (i) Schweizerische Industrie Gesellschaft (German, "Swiss Industry Company"). See also SIG Sauer, a firearms manufacturer spun off from the aforementioned company in 2000.
  - (p) .signature (UNIX shell/Internet standard file name)
  - (a/i) Special Interest Group
  - (a/i) Strasbourg Illkirch-Graffenstaden Basket (French basketball club)
- SIGCAT – (a) Special Interest Group for CD-ROM Applications and Technology
- SIGINT – (p) Signals Intelligence
- SIGMET – (p) Significant Meteorological Information
- SIIT
  - (i) Saskatchewan Indian Institute of Technologies (Canadian university)
  - Sirindhorn International Institute of Technology (Thai university)
  - Stateless IP/ICMP Translation algorithm
- SIMAC – (a) Semantic Interaction with Music Audio Contents
- SIMLAS – (p) Soldier Integrated Multipurpose Laser System
- SIMM – (a) Single In-line Memory Module
- SIMNET – (p) SIMulator NETwork, later SIMulation NETwork
- SIMNET-D - (p) SIMNET-Developmental
- SIMP – (a) Strongly Interacting Massive Particle
- SIMPLE
  - (a) Satellite Interactive Multimedia Platform for Low-cost Earth stations
  - (p) Savings Incentive Match Plan for Employees (as used in SIMPLE IRA)
  - (a) Standard Interface for Multiple Platform Link Evaluation (NATO STANAG 5602)
- sin – (s) Sinhala language (ISO 639-2 code)
- SIN – (a) Social insurance number (Canada)
- SINCGARS – (p) SINgle Channel Ground and Airborne Radio System
- SIP
  - (i) Session Initiation Protocol
  - State Implementation Plan
  - System Improvement Program
  - Systematic investment plan
- SIPP – (a) Self-Invested Personal Pension
- Siri – (a) Speech Interpretation and Recognition Interface (Apple iOS software)
- SIRI – (a) Service Interface for Real Time Information
- SIRS — (a) Systemic inflammatory response syndrome
- SiS – (i) Silicon Integrated Systems
- SIS – (i) UK Secret Intelligence Service (also known as MI6)
- SISO
  - (a) Simulation Interoperability Standards Organization
  - Society of Independent Show Organizers
- SIW – (i) Simulation Interoperability Workshop
- SIYSS – (i) Stockholm International Youth Science Seminar

== SJ ==
- SJ
  - (s) Svalbard and Jan Mayen (ISO 3166 digram)
  - (i) Societas Iesu (Latin: The Society of Jesus, the Jesuit order)
  - (i) Statens Järnvägar (Swedish State Railways)
- SJA – (i) Staff Judge Advocate (military law)
- SJC – (i) Supreme Judicial Court of Massachusetts (note: the highest court in the state of Maine is also called the Supreme Judicial Court)
- SJM – (s) Svalbard and Jan Mayen (ISO 3166 trigram)
- SJW – (i) Social Justice Warrior

== SK ==
- sk – (s) Slovak language (ISO 639-1 code)
- SK
  - (s) Saskatchewan (postal symbol)
  - Slovakia (ISO 3166 digram)
- SKC – (s) Clear Sky (METAR Code)
- SKK – (s) Slovak koruna (ISO 4217 currency code)
- SKM – (s) Sikkim (ISO 3166 trigram; obsolete 1975)
- SKU - (i) Stock Keeping Unit

== SL ==
- sl – (s) Slovene language (ISO 639-1 code)
- SL
  - (s) Sierra Leone (ISO 3166 and FIPS 10-4 country code digram)
  - (i) Start Line
- SLA
  - (i) Service Level Agreement
  - Symbionese Liberation Army
- SLAA – (i) Sex and Love Addicts Anonymous
- SLAC – (a) Stanford Linear Accelerator Center
- SLAN – (i) sine loco, anno, nomine (Latin, "without place, year, or name")
- SLAP – (a) Saboted light armor penetrator (type of firearms ammunition)
- SLAPP – (a) Strategic lawsuit against public participation
- SLB – (s) Solomon Islands (ISO 3166 trigram)
- SLBM – (i) Sea/Submarine-Launched Ballistic Missile
- SLC – (i) Scan Line Corrector
- SLE – (s) Sierra Leone (ISO 3166 trigram)
- SLI/SLi
  - (i/s) Scan-Line Interleave
  - Scalable Link Interface
- SLIT – (p) SubLingual ImmunoTherapy
- slk – (s) Slovak language (ISO 639-2 code)
- SLL – (s) Sierra Leone leone (ISO 4217 currency code)
- SLO – (s) Slovenia (IOC trigram, but not FIFA or ISO 3166)
- SLOC
  - (a) Sea Lines Of Communication
  - Source Lines Of Code
- SLORC – (a) State Law and Order Restoration Council (of Burma)
- SLP
  - (i) Sea Level Pressure
  - (i) Super Long Play
- slph – (s) Standard litre per hour (air flow)
- slpm – (s) Standard litre per minute (air flow)
- slps – (s) Standard litre per second (air flow)
- SLR – (i) Single-Lens Reflex (camera)
- SLT
  - (i) Single Lens Translucent
  - (i) Speech and language therapist
  - (i) Solid Logic Technology (electronics)
  - Swing Landing Trainer (paratroops)
  - (i) Secondary lymphoid tissue
- slv – (s) Slovenian language (ISO 639-2 code)
- SLV – (s) El Salvador (ISO 3166 trigram)

== SM ==
- sm – (s) Samoan language (ISO 639-1 code)
- Sm – (s) Samarium
- SM
  - (i) Sado-Masochism
  - (s) San Marino (ISO 3166 and FIPS 10-4 country code digram)
  - (i) Soldier's Manual
  - (s) Submarine Minelayer (US Navy hull classification)
- SMA – (i) Scan Mirror Assembly
- SMART - many different meanings
- SMASS – (a) Small Main-Belt Asteroid Spectroscopic Survey
- SMB – (i) Super Mario Bros.
- SMCT – (i) Soldier's Manual of Common Tasks
- SMD – (i) Surface Mount Device
- SMDR – (i) Station Message Detail Recording
- sme – (s) Northern Sami language (ISO 639-2 code)
- SME
  - (i) Scan Mirror Electronics
  - Subject Matter Expert
- SMG
  - (i) Sequential Motorsport Gearbox
  - SubMachine Gun
- SMH – (a) Shaking My Head
- SMil – (a) Sadomasochisterne i landet (Danish SM organisation)
- SMIL – (a) Synchronized Multimedia Integration Language
- smo – (s) Samoan language (ISO 639-2 code)
- SMP – (i) Standard Military Pattern
- SM&R – (i) Source, Maintenance, and Recoverability
- SMR – (s) San Marino (ISO 3166 trigram)
- SMS – many, including: Short message service; see entry
- SMTP – (i) Simple Mail Transfer Protocol
- SMU – (i) Southern Methodist University
- SMV – (i) Symbolic model verification
- SMX
  - many, including: (i) Server Macro Expansion
  - (p) Solaris MINIX
  - (p) Spatial multiplexing
  - (p) Sulfamethoxazole; see entry
- SMZ
  - many, including: (i) Silver Mt. Zion
  - (p) Sulfamethazine
  - (p) Sulfamethoxazole; see entry

== SN ==
- sn – (s) Shona language (ISO 639-1 code)
- Sn – (s) Tin (Latin Stannum)
- SN
  - (s) Senegal (ISO 3166 digram)
  - Singapore (FIPS 10-4 country code)
  - Snow (METAR Code)
  - SuperNova
  - Screen Name
- sna – (s) Shona language (ISO 639-2 code)
- SNAFU – (a) "Situation Normal — All Fouled/Fucked Up"
- SNAP – (p) Supernova/Acceleration Probe
- SNCB – (i) Société nationale des chemins de fer de Belgique (French for "Belgian Railways National Society", NMBS in Dutch)
- SNCF – (i) Société nationale des chemins de fer français (French for "French Railways National Society")
- snd – (s) Sindhi language (ISO 639-2 code)
- SND – (i) Standard Nomenclature Database
- SNE – (i) Synthetic Natural Environment
- SNES – Super Nintendo Entertainment System
- SNÉTA – (a) Syndicat national pour l'étude des transports aériens (French for "Aerial transport Study National Syndicate", 1919–1923)
- SNG – (i) Satellite News Gathering (television)
- SNL
  - (i) Saturday Night Live (television)
  - (i) Società Navigazione del Lago di Lugano
- SNM – (i) Special Nuclear Material
- SNMP – (i) Simple Network Management Protocol
- SNOBOL – (p) StriNg Oriented symBOlic Language
- SNP – (i) Single-nucleotide polymorphism
- SNR
  - (i) SuperNova Remnant
  - Signal-to-Noise Ratio
- SNRI – (i) Serotonin-Norepinephrine Reuptake Inhibitor
- SNS – (i) Spallation Neutron Source
- SNU – (i) Solar Neutrino Unit

== SO ==
- so – (s) Somali language (ISO 639-1 code)
- SO
  - (i) Shared Object (Unix)
  - Sheriff's Office
  - Significant other
  - (s) Somalia (ISO 3166 and FIPS 10-4 country code digram)
- SOA
  - (a) service-oriented architecture
  - (a) Society of Actuaries
  - (i) State of the art
- SOAP
  - (a) Simple Object Access Protocol
  - Supplemental Offer and Acceptance Program (U.S. medical residency matching)
- SOB
  - (i) Son Of a Bitch
  - Same Old Bullshit
- SOC – (a) Sector Operations Centre
- Soccsksargen – (p) South Cotabato, Cotabato, Sultan Kudarat, Sarangani, General Santos (a region in the Philippines; pronounced "sock-sar-gen")
- SOCOM – (p) (U.S.) Special Operations Command
- SoCon – (p) Southern Conference (U.S. college sports)
- SOD
  - (i/a) School Of Dentistry
  - Statement Of Difference(s)
  - Statement Of Direction
  - Statement Of Documentation
  - Statement Of Duty/Duties
- SOE
  - (i) Secret Of Evermore
  - Special Operations Executive (WWII British organization)
  - State Of Emissions (EW)
- SOF
  - (a/i) Special Operations Force(s)
  - Status of Forces
- SOFIA – (a) Stratospheric Observatory For Infrared Astronomy
- SOGAT
  - (a) Society of Graphical and Allied Trades
  - Former British printing union
- SOHC – (i) Single-OverHead-Cam engine
- SOHO – (p) Solar and Heliospheric Observatory
- SOI
  - (i) Signal Operating Instruction
  - (i) Southern Oscillation Index
- SOL – (i) Shit Out of Luck
- SOLIS – (i) Synoptic Optical Long-term Investigations of the Sun
- som – (s) Somali language (ISO 639-2 code)
- SOM
  - (a) Simulation Object Model
  - (s) Somalia (ISO 3166 trigram)
- Sonar – (p) SOund Navigation And Ranging
- SOP
  - (i) Standing/Standard Operating Procedure
  - State of Play
- SOR
  - (i) State Of Readiness
  - Statement Of Requirements
- SOS
  - (s) Somali shilling (ISO 4217 currency code)
  - Save Our Souls
- SOSTAR – (a) Stand-Off Surveillance and Target Acquisition Radar
- sot – (s) Sotho language (ISO 639-2 code)
- SOUTHAG – (p) Southern Army Group
- SOUTHCOM – (p) (U.S.) Southern Command
- SOV – (i) Single Occupant Vehicle
- SOW – (i) Statement Of Work
- SOWHAT – (p) RESNA Subcommittee on Wheelchairs and Transportation
- SOX – (p) Sarbanes–Oxley Act

== SP ==
- Sp
  - (p) Special
  - Spring tide (nautical charts)
  - (i) sine prole (Latin, "without offspring")
- SP
  - (i) Security Police
  - Self-Propelled
  - Shore Patrol
  - (s) Spain (FIPS 10-4 country code)
  - (i) Start Point
  - Strong Point
- spa – (s) Spanish language (ISO 639-2 code)
- SPA - Single Page Application
- SPAAG – (a) Self-Propelled Anti-Aircraft Gun
- SPAC - Saratoga Performing Arts Center
- SPACECOM – (p) (U.S.) Space Command
- SPAL – (a) Società Polisportiva Ars et Labor ("Art & Labor Sports Club", with the "SP" from Italian and "AL" from Latin), Italian football club
- Spaser – (a) Surface plasmon amplification by stimulated emission of radiation
- SPC – (i) Secretariat of the Pacific Community
- SPCA - Society for the Prevention of Cruelty to Animals
- SPCO – (i) Single-Pole Change Over
- SPD
  - (i) Shimano Pedaling Dynamics
  - Sozialdemokratische Partei Deutschlands (Social Democratic Party of Germany)
- SPDT – (i) Single-Pole Double-Throw
- SPEAC – (a) Stop Primate Experiments at Cambridge (later became SPEAK)
- SPECTRE – SPecial Executive for Counter-intelligence, Terrorism, Revenge and Extortion
- S.P.E.A.R. - Spontaneous Protection Enabling Accelerated Response
- SPEED – (a) Subsistence Preparation by Electronic Energy Diffusion (early military microwave oven)
- SPIE – (i) originally the Society for Photo-Optical Instrumentation Engineers ("SPIE – The International Society for Optical Engineering" 1981–2007, "SPIE" since 2007)
- SPL
  - (i) Scottish Premier League
  - Superior Parietal Lobule
  - Sound pressure level
- SPM – (s) Saint Pierre and Miquelon (ISO 3166 trigram)
- SPOD – (a/i) Sea Port of Debarkation
- SPOE – (a/i) Sea Port of Embarkation
- SPOT – (a) Satellite pour l'observation de la Terre (French, "Satellite for Earth Observation")
- SPQR – (i) Senatus Populusque Romanus (Latin "The Senate and the People of Rome")
- sps – (i) sine prole superstite (Latin, "without surviving issue")
- SPS – (i) Standard Positioning Service (GPS)
- SPST – (i) Single-Pole Single-Throw

== SQ ==
- sq – (s) Albanian language (ISO 639-1 code)
- SQ – (i) Sound Quality
- SQ – (i) Standard Quality
- sqi – (s) Albanian language (ISO 639-2 code)
- SQL – (i/a) Structured Query Language ("seek-well")
- SQS - Amazon Simple Queue Service
- SQUID – (p) Superconducting QUantum Interference Device
- SQOR – (p) Succinate:Quinone OxidoReductase, enzyme superfamily including quinone-linked succinate dehydrogenase and fumarate reductase

== SR ==
- sr – (s) Serbian language (ISO 639-1 code)
- Sr – (s) Strontium
- SR
  - (i) Sound Reinforcement
  - Supply Route
  - (s) Suriname (ISO 3166 digram)
  - (i) Sveriges Radio (Swedish Radio Ltd)
- SR – (i) Sustained release of a drug
- SRAM
  - (p) Scott (King), Ray (Day), SAM (Patterson) — founders of bicycle component manufacturer SRAM Corporation
  - (p) Static Random Access Memory ("ess-ram")
- SR-ATGW – (i) Short-Range Anti-Tank Guided Weapon
- SRB – (i) Solid Rocket Booster
- SRBM – (i) Short-Range Ballistic Missile (cf. IRBM, ICBM)
- SRC – (i) Scheduled Removal Component
- srd – (s) Sardinian language (ISO 639-2 code)
- SRD
  - (i) Science Requirements Document
  - (s) Surinam dollar (ISO 4217 currency code)
- SRE - (i) Site Reliability Engineer(ing)
- SREL – (i) Savannah River Ecology Laboratory
- SRG
  - (i) SACEUR Rover Group
  - Special Republican Guard
- SRGW – (i) Short-Range Guided Weapon
- SRL
  - (i) Savannah River Laboratory
  - Single Rocket Launcher
  - Survival Research Labs
- SRM – (i) Specified Risk Material(s)
- srp – (s) Serbian language (ISO 639-2 code)
- SRS – (i) Savannah River Site
- SRTP – (i) [Secure Real-time Transport Protocol]

== SS ==
- ss – (s) Swati language (ISO 639-1 code)
- SS
  - (s) Sand Storm (METAR Code)
  - (p) Schutzstaffel (German, roughly "Protection Squadron"; Nazi elite Praetorian guard)
  - (i) U.S. Secret Service
  - Spanish Ship
  - Stainless steel
  - Stockholm Skins
  - (s) Submarine (US Navy hull classification)
  - (i) Super Sport
  - Surface-to-Surface (missile)
- SSA
  - (s) Cargo Submarine (US Navy hull classification)
  - (i) Social Security Administration (U.S.)
  - Statistics South Africa
- SSB – (a) Single-sideband modulation
- SSB – (i) Sacramento Sustainable Business
- SSBN – (s) Nuclear-Powered Ballistic Missile Submarine (US Navy hull classification)
- SSC
  - (i) Safe, Sane, Consensual (SM phrase)
  - Secondary Somatosensory Cortex
  - Smaller-Scale Contingency
  - U.S. Army Soldiers System Center (Natick, Massachusetts)
  - Superconducting Super Collider
- SSCCATAGAPP – Singles, Seniors, Childless Couples, And Teens And Gays Against Parasitic Parents (fictional organization from The Simpsons)
- SSD
  - (i) Solid-state drive
  - (s) South Sudan (ISO 3166 trigram)
- SSDC – (i) U.S. Space and Strategic Defense Command
- SSDD
  - (i) Same Shit, Different Day
  - Single-Sided Double-Density (floppy disk)
- SSE
  - (s) South-southeast
  - (i) Streaming SIMD Extensions
- SSG – (s) Guided Missile Submarine (retired US Navy hull classification)
- SSGN – (s) Nuclear-Powered Guided Missile Submarine (US Navy hull classification)
- SSH – (i) Saffir-Simpson Hurricane scale
- SSK – (s) Hunter-Killer Submarine (retired US Navy hull classification)
- SSKP – (i) Single-Shot Kill Probability
- SSL – (i) Secure Sockets Layer
- SSM – (i) Surface-to-Surface (Guided) Missile
- SSN
  - (s) Nuclear-Powered Attack Submarine (US Navy hull classification)
  - (i) SIM Serial Number
  - Social Security Number (U.S.)
  - Socialist Solidarity Network
  - Subsystem number (SCCP, SS7)
- SSNW – (i) Same Shit, New Wrapping
- SSO – (s) Submarine Oiler (retired US Navy hull classification)
- SSP – (s) Submarine Transport (retired US Navy hull classification)
- SSR
  - (s) Radar Picket Submarine (retired US Navy hull classification)
  - (i) Solid State Recorder
- SSRI
  - (i) Selective Serotonin Reuptake Inhibitor
  - Social Systems Research Institute
- SSRN
  - (i) Social Science Research Network
  - (s) Nuclear-Powered Radar Picket Submarine (retired US Navy hull classification)
- SSS
  - (i) Siding Spring Survey
  - Side Side Side (an acronym for remembering congruent triangles)
  - (i) Sigue Sigue Sputnik (band)
- S/SSM – (i) Surface-to-Subsurface Missile
- SST
  - (i) SuperSonic Transport
  - (s) Training Submarine (US Navy hull classification)
  - Saturated Suction Temperature (refrigeration cycles)
- SSTO – (i) Single-Stage To Orbit
- SSV – (i) Soft-Skinned Vehicle (i.e., unarmoured)
- ssw – (s) Swati language (ISO 639-2 code)
- SSW – (s) South South-West

== ST ==
- st – (s) Sotho language (ISO 639-1 code)
- ST
  - (s) Saint Lucia (FIPS 10-4 country code)
  - São Tomé and Príncipe (ISO 3166 digram)
- STA
  - (i) Scheduled Time of Arrival
  - Surveillance and Target Acquisition
- STAGE – (a) Scenario Toolkit And Generation Environment
- STANAG – (p) (NATO) Standardisation Agreement
- STAR
  - (a) Scientific and Technical Aerospace Reports (NASA)
  - Simulation of Tactical Alternative Responses
  - Special Threat Analysis and Recognition
- STAT
  - (a) Signal Transducers and Activators of Transcription (cell biology)
  - Special Tertiary Admissions Test (Australia)
- STB - Surface Transportation Board
- STC – (i) Superior Temporal Cortex
- S&TCD – (i) CERDEC Space and Terrestrial Communications Directorate
- STD
  - (s) São Tomé and Príncipe dobra (ISO 4217 currency code)
  - (i) Sexually Transmitted Disease
- STDM – (i) Statistical Time Division Multiplexing
- STEM
  - (a) Scanning transmission electron microscopy
  - Science, technology, engineering, and mathematics
  - (p) Spatiaotemporal Epidemiological Modeler (IBM-developed software)
- STENTOR – (p) Satellite de télécommunications pour expérimenter de nouvelles technologies en orbite (French, "Orbital New Technology Experimental Telecommunications Satellite")
- STFU
  - (i) Southern Tenant Farmers Union
  - Stuff You
  - "Shut the fuck up!"
- STH – Sonic the Hedgehog
- STI
  - (i) Sexually Transmitted Infection
  - Subaru Tecnica International
- STK – (i) Satellite Tool Kit
- STM – (i) Short Term Memory
- STOL – (i) Short Take-Off and Landing
- STOVL – (i) Short Take-Off and Vertical Landing
- STP
  - (s) São Tomé and Príncipe (ISO 3166 trigram)
  - (i) Standard Temperature and Pressure
- STR – (i) Short Tandem Repeat (DNA analysis)
- STRATCOM – (p) United States Strategic Command
- STRICOM
  - (p) U.S. Army Simulation, Training & Instrumentation Command (1992–)
  - Strike Command (1962–1971)
- STRIVE – (a) Synthetic Tactical Real-time Interactive Virtual Environment
- STSM – (i) Senior Technical Staff Member
- Stuka – (p) Sturzkampfflugzeug (German WWII dive bomber)

== SU ==
- su – (s) Sundanese language (ISO 639-1 code)
- SU
  - (s) Soviet Union (ISO 3166 digram; obsolete 1992)
  - Sudan (FIPS 10-4 country code)
- SUB – (i) Student Union Building
- SuD – (a) Subject under Discussion
- SUDC – Swedish United Dawah Center, a salafist Islamic organisation in Sweden
- SUI
  - (a) Sonic user interface
  - (s) Switzerland (IOC and FIFA trigram, but not ISO 3166)
- SUK – Start Up Kit
- sun – (s) Sundanese language (ISO 639-2 code)
- SUN – (s)
  - Soviet Union (ISO 3166 trigram; obsolete 1992)
  - Stanford University Network that led to Sun Microsystems
- SUNY – (a) State University of New York (usually pronounced "sue-knee")
- SUR – (s) Suriname (ISO 3166 trigram)
- SURTASS – (p) Surveillance Towed Array Sensor System
- SUSAT – (a) Sight Unit Small Arms, Trilux
- SUV – (i) Sport Utility Vehicle

== SV ==
- sv – (s) Swedish language (ISO 639-1 code)
- SV
  - (s) El Salvador (ISO 3166 digram)
  - (p) Sportverein (German for "Sport Association", as in Hamburger SV and SV Werder Bremen)
- SVC – (i) Secondary Visual Cortex
- SvD – (p) Svenska Dagbladet (Swedish newspaper)
- SVD
  - (i) Singular Value Decomposition
  - Snaiperskaya Vintovka Dragunova (Снайперская винтовка Драгунова, Russian for "Dragunov Sniper Rifle")
- SVG – (i) Scalable Vector Graphics
- SVK – (s) Slovakia (ISO 3166 trigram)
- SVM
  - (p) Stroboscopic effect Visibility Measure; a measure for assessing a type of temporal light artefacts
  - (i) Support Vector Machine (artificial intelligence)
- SVN – (s) Slovenia (ISO 3166 and FIFA trigram)
- SVO – (i) subject–verb–object
- SVR – (i) Sluzhba Vneshney Razvedki (Служба Внешней Разведки, Russian for "Foreign Intelligence Service")

== SW ==
- sw – (s) Swahili language (ISO 639-1 code)
- SW
  - (s) South-West ordinal direction
  - Sweden (FIPS 10-4 country code)
  - (a) Shortwave
  - Star Wars
- swa – (s) Swahili language (ISO 639-2 code)
- SWA
  - (i/a) Secure Web Access
  - South-West Asia
- SWAC – (p) Southwestern Athletic Conference
- SWAG
  - Scientific wild-ass guess, slang for a rough estimate based on expert experience
  - Sourceware Archive Group, a free collection of classified source code and sample programs written in Pascal
  - Sport Writers Association of Ghana, Sports Writers Association based in Ghana
  - Special Warfare Group, a former name used by the Naval Special Operations Command
  - "Supporters Without A Game", sport slang spun off from WAGs ("wives and girlfriends")
- SWALK – (a) Sealed With A Loving Kiss
- SWAN – (a) System for Wearable Audio Navigation
- SWAP – (a) Surface Waters Acidification Programme
- SWAPO – (a) South-West Africa People's Organisation
- SWAT – (a) Special Weapons And Tactics
- swe – (s) Swedish language (ISO 639-2 code)
- SWE – (s) Sweden (ISO 3166 trigram)
- SWF
  - (p) Shockwave Flash file ("swiff")
  - Single White Female
- SWG
  - (i) Surface Warfare Group
  - Symbology Working Group
- SWHR – (i) Society for Women's Health Research
- SWIG – (a) Simplified Wrapper and Interface Generator
- SWIR – (a/i) Short Wave InfraRed ("ss-why-are" or "swhirr")
- SWLABR – (i) "She Was Like A Bearded Rainbow", a song by the band Cream
- SWORD – (p) Subjective WORkload Dominance
- SWORDS – (a) Special Weapons Observation Reconnaissance Detection System
- SWOT – (a) Strengths, Weaknesses, Opportunities, Threats (mnemonic)
- SWP
  - (i) Special Working Party ("swipp")
  - Systematic Westing Plan (a plan of periodic westing of shares or mutual funds worth a fixed amount of money)
  - Skill with prize (UK pub quiz machines — quality titles include: Pub Quiz, Quiz City, Frog in a Liquidizer, Who Wants To Win a Tenner?)
- SWT – (i) Sea Water Tank
- SWV – (i) Sisters With Voices (American female R&B vocal group)
- SWZ – (s) Swaziland (ISO 3166 trigram)

== SX ==
- SX – (i) Sonic X
- SXM
  - (s) Sint Maarten (ISO 3166 trigram)
  - (i) Stream X-Machine

== SY ==
- SY – (s) Syria (ISO 3166 and FIPS 10-4 country code digram)
- SYC – (s) Seychelles (ISO 3166 trigram)
- SYLK – Microsoft 'Symbolic Link' data file format
- SYP – (s) Syrian pound (ISO 4217 currency code)
- SYR – (s) Syria (ISO 3166 trigram)
- Syriza – (p) Synaspismós Rizospastikís Aristerás (Greek Συνασπισμός Ριζοσπαστικής Αριστεράς, "Coalition of the Radical Left")
- SysML – (p) System Modeling Language
- Sysop – (p) System Operator

== SZ ==
- SZ
  - (s) Swaziland (ISO 3166 digram)
  - Switzerland (FIPS 10-4 country code)
- SZL – (s) Swaziland lilangeni (ISO 4217 currency code)
