= Pacific Forum =

Pacific Forum may refer to:

- Pacific Forum International, a Honolulu-based foreign policy research institute founded in 1975
- Pacific Islands Forum, an inter-governmental organization founded in 1971 to enhance cooperation between countries and territories of the South Pacific Ocean
