= SWIR =

SWIR may refer to:

- Short-wavelength infrared, a region of the infrared light spectrum
- Sierra Wireless, a multinational communication company
- Southwest Indian Ridge, a mid-ocean ridge between Africa and Antarctica

== See also ==
- Svir (disambiguation)
