= Pacific Forum International =

US-based non-profit research institute

Pacific Forum
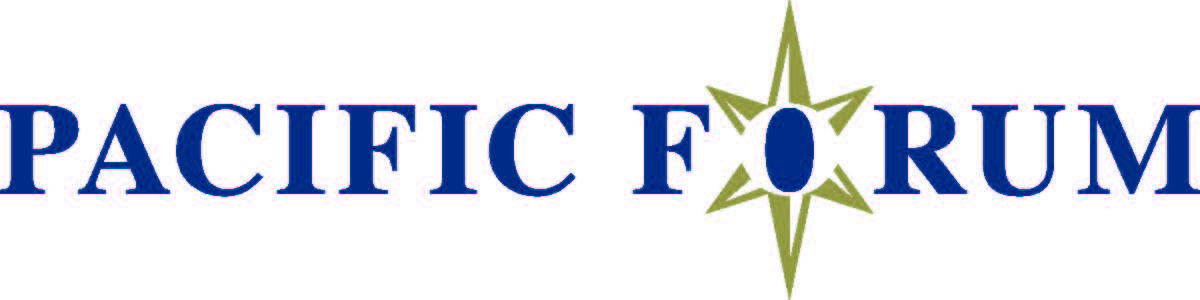
- Formation: 1975; 51 years ago
- Type: International affairs think tank
- Tax ID no.: 82-4525112
- Legal status: 501(c)(3)
- Headquarters: 1003 Bishop Street, Pauahi Tower Suite 1150 Honolulu, HI 96813, United States
- Location: Honolulu, Hawaii
- Chairman: Ralph Cossa
- President: David Santoro
- Website: pacforum.org

Pacific Forum is a Honolulu-based foreign policy research institute focused on the Indo-Pacific. Founded in 1975, the Pacific forum collaborates with a network of research institutes from around the Pacific Rim, drawing on Asian perspectives and disseminating project findings and recommendations to global leaders, governments, and members of the public. The Pacific Forum states that its "studies are objective and nonpartisan, and it does not engage in classified or proprietary work".

== History ==
Pacific Forum was founded in 1975. As a foreign policy institute, it focuses on cooperative policies and diplomacy in the Indo-Pacific. The founder was Joe Vasey, a lieutenant commander during World War II, and who created the Pacific Forum after retiring as a two-star admiral. Pacific Forum’s founder, Lloyd R. Vasey (1917-2018), retired from the US Navy as a Rear Admiral in 1972 after serving as chief strategist (J-5) for US Pacific Command under Admiral John S. McCain Jr. According to later Pacific Forum board chair Ralph Cossa, Vasey had the idea for the forum while on submarine duty and "running out of air" under pursuit from a Japanese destroyer. Vasey had decided that if he survived, he'd "find a better way of solving problems than people dropping bombs on one another." Says the Pacific Forum website, it was founded with a mission of establishing "a Forum in the Pacific under the auspices of the private sector for a continuing trans-Pacific private dialogue and consultation among the developing and developed countries of the Pacific area."

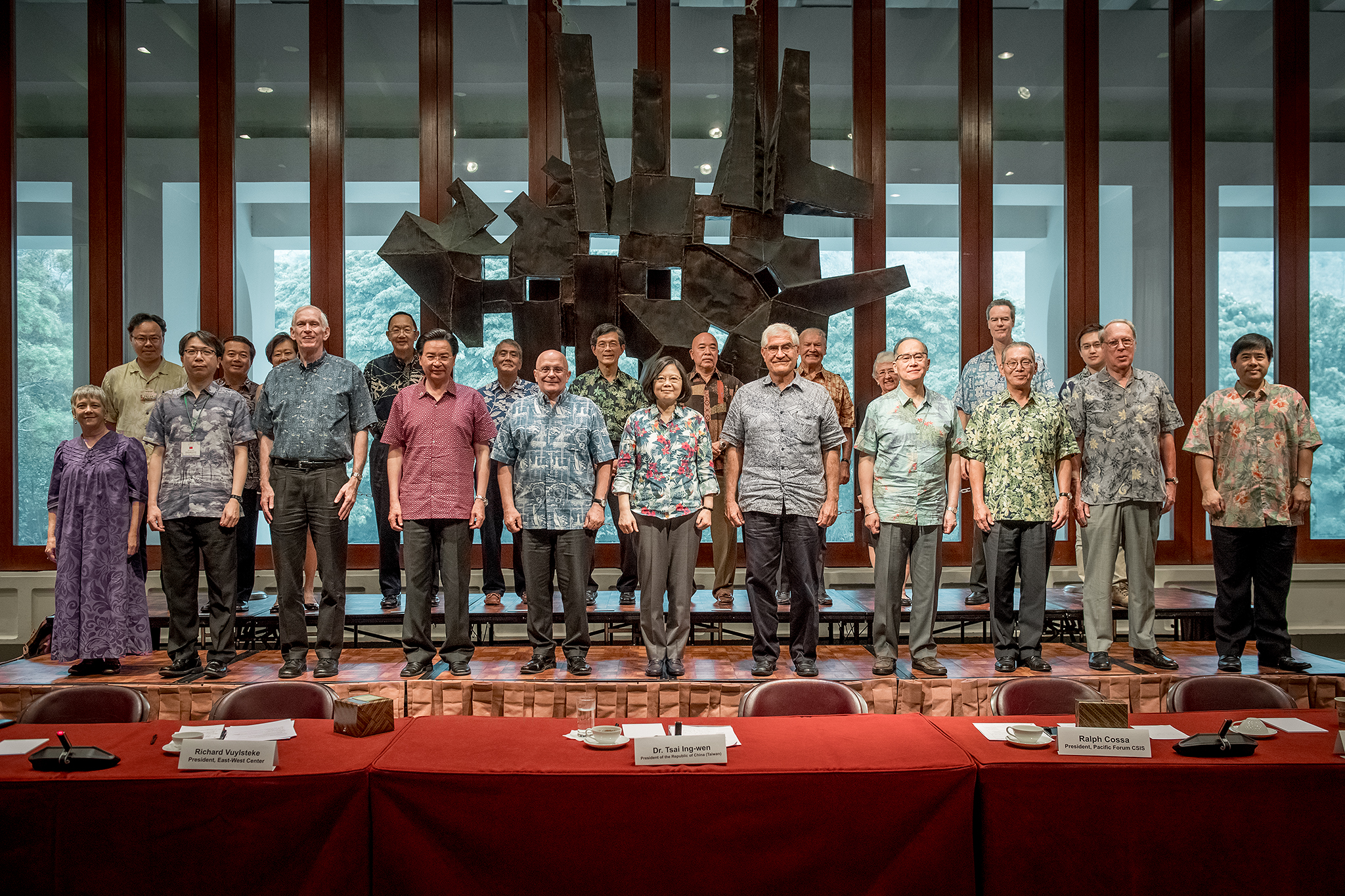
Taiwanese President Tsai Ing-wen attends a seminar co-organized by Pacific Forum and East West Center in Honolulu, Hawaii.

From 1989 to 2018, Pacific Forum was an affiliate of the Center for Strategic and International Studies. During the 1989 merger, Pacific Forum retained its name, board, independent program agenda, and funding responsibility. In 2013, its board consisted of 25 governors, with SKC chairman Choi Shin-wan as one of its members. In 2018, Pacific Forum became a fully independent research institute with a full-time staff of 12, a rotating resident research fellow cohort of approximately 5–8 people, and an annual budget of approximately $2.8 million. Its current tax expemption as a 501(c)(3) nonprofit, according to Propublica, was issued in March 2018. Its filing showed 2025 revenue of $4.38 million, and 2025 expenses of $4.11 million.

In January 2024, the Pacific Forum hosted the annual Operationalizing Integration in the Indo-Pacific Conference in Oahu, with attendees such as Australian Prime Minister Scott Morrison. Nato director of policy planning Benedetta Berti also attended. In April 2025, it remained based in Oahu. President and CEO of the Pacific Forum was David Santoro. Ralph Cossa was board chair. James A. Kelly is former chairman.

== Programs ==
=== Honolulu Defense Forum ===
In 2024, Pacific Forum began hosting the Honolulu Defense Forum, held again in February 2025, with high participation from European nations, said Hawai'i Public Radio. The Pacific Forum again hosted the annual two-day Honolulu Defense Forum in January 2026 in Waikiki, with figures in military, policy, and business attending. Among speakers were Japanese Defense Minister Shinjirō Koizumi, US admiral Samuel Paparo, and Palau President Surangel Whipps Jr. Paparo, who commands all US forces in the Indo-Pacific region, gave opening keynote.

=== Young Leaders Program ===
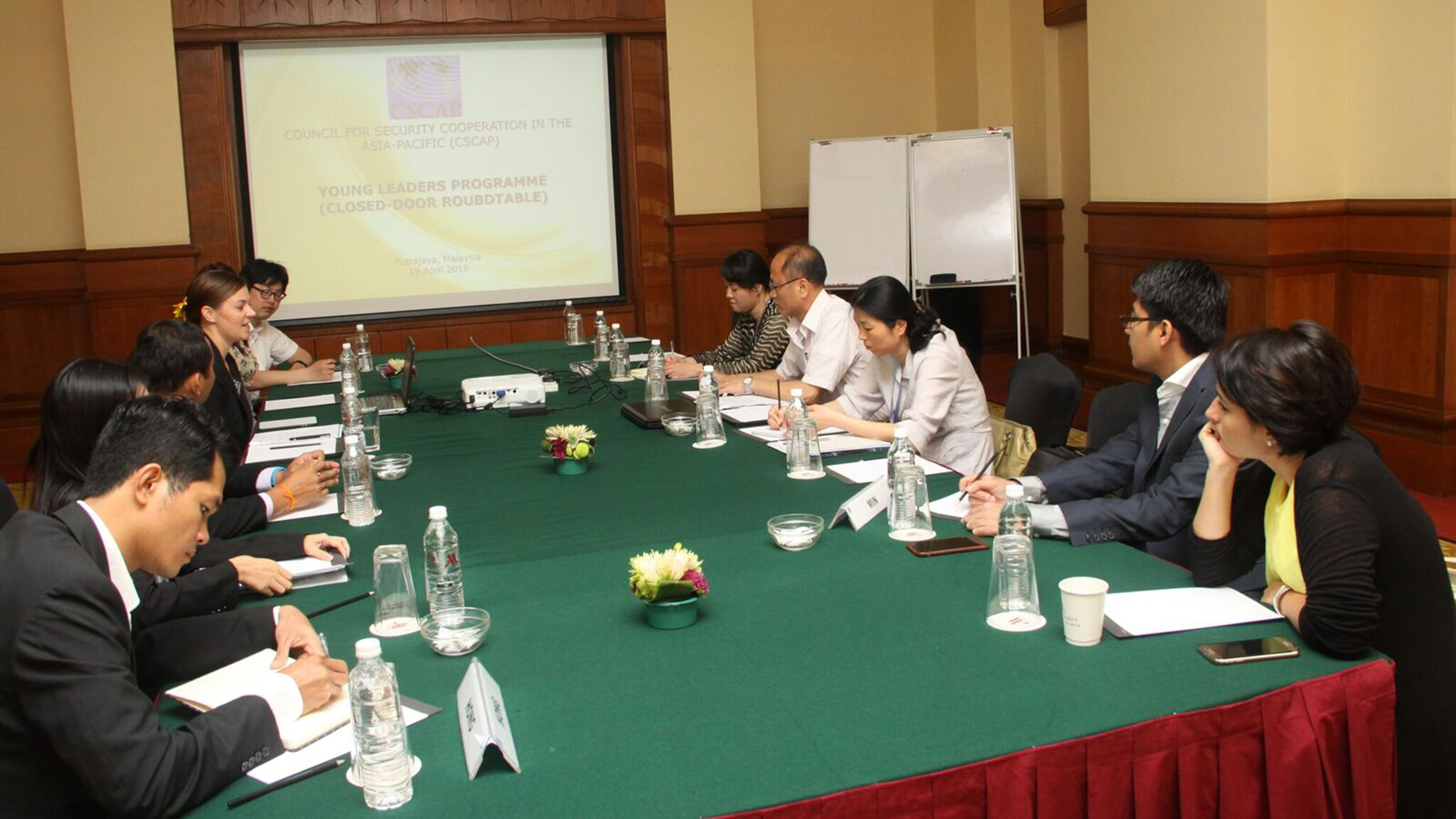
Pacific Forum Young Leaders with junior officials from North Korea

The Young Leaders Program was established in 2004 to train young professionals in international policy affairs at an early juncture in their careers. Currently, the organization’s network of Young Leaders consists of more than 1,000 members from 56 countries.

=== Regional Engagement Program ===
The Pacific Forum’s Regional Engagement Program conducts outreach efforts to scholars and the public at large in Japan, South Korea, and Australia on various foreign and security policy issues in the Indo-Pacific. The Regional Engagement Program also focuses on nonproliferation in the Indo-Pacific, including in Myanmar.

=== Strategic Stability Program ===
The Pacific Forum promotes strategic stability in the region primarily through a series of Track 1.5 dialogues focused on affirming US commitments to its alliance partners and maintaining a strategic balance in the Indo-Pacific.

=== Security Cooperation Program ===
The Pacific Forum’s program on security cooperation in the Indo-Pacific is organized around its membership in the Council for Security Cooperation in the Asia Pacific (CSCAP). Pacific Forum is one of the founding institutions of the CSCAP and manages its US member committee. The security cooperation program assesses and promotes security cooperation relating to the proliferation and nonproliferation of weapons of mass destruction, strategic trade controls, maritime security, counter-terrorism, transnational crime, and cyber security.

== Publications ==
Pacific Forum produces three regular publications from the organization’s own research as well as by external authors. These publications include:

- Comparative Connections (http://cc.pacforum.org/)
- Issues and Insights (https://pacforum.org/programs/issues-insights)
- PacNet Commentaries (https://pacforum.org/programs/pacnet-commentary).

== Budget ==
The Pacific Forum states that its funding comes from grants, foundations, governments, corporations and individuals. In 2019, Pacific Forum reported a budget of $2.8 million.
