= SADL =

SADL may refer to:

- Sainte-Anne-des-Lacs, Quebec
- The International Civil Aviation Organization airport code for La Plata Airport
- Semantic Application Design Language, a language for building semantic models
- Situation Awareness Data Link, an example component of an Enhanced Position Location Reporting System
- The Southern Alberta Digital Library at the University of Lethbridge
- System Architecture Description Language, an implementation of an Architecture description language

== See also ==
- Sadler (name), its abbreviation
