= SRD =

SRD may refer to:

- Sardinian language's ISO 639 code
- Serenissimus Rudolfus Dux, a title of Archduke Rudolf of Austria
- Services Reconnaissance Department, an Australian WWII agency
- Short-range device for radio communication
- Sports Radio Detroit
- SR-D, a Dolby technology
- Stapleton Road railway station's station code
- Step recovery diode
- Surinamese dollar by ISO 4217 currency code
- System Reference Document in role-playing games
- Systems Research & Development, a Nintendo subsidiary
- Srđ, a mountain in Dalmatia, Croatia
- SRD: Super Real Darwin, 1987 video game
