= SFIO (disambiguation) =

SFIO may stand for:

- French Section of the Workers' International (Section Française de l'Internationale Ouvrière), a former French Socialist Party
- Serious Fraud Investigation Office, an Indian law enforcement agency
- Safe/Fast I/O library from AT&T Labs Research, for C file input/output
