= SHN =

SHN, or Shn, may refer to:

- School health and nutrition services
- Servicio de Hidrografia Naval, the Argentine Naval Hydrographic Service
- SHN (theatres), a theatrical production company, now known as BroadwaySF, in San Francisco, US
- SHN, the file name extension for the Shorten file format
- SHN, the IATA code for Sanderson Field in the state of Washington, US
- SHN, the ISO 3166-1 alpha-3 code for Saint Helena, Ascension and Tristan da Cunha
- shn, the ISO 639-3 code for the Shan language spoken in Shan State, Myanmar
- SHN, the National Rail code for Shanklin railway station on the Isle of Wight, UK
