= SQI =

SQI or sqi may refer to:

- SQI, the IATA code for Whiteside County Airport, Illinois, United States
- SQI, the Pinyin code for Shangqiu railway station, Henan, China
- sqi, the ISO 639-3 code for Albanian language
