= SAWE =

Professional association of engineers

The Society of Allied Weight Engineers (SAWE) is a professional society of engineers that pertains to the specific field of mass properties.

The Society of Allied Weight Engineers is an international organization whose primary purpose is to promote the recognition of “Mass Properties Engineering” as a specialized branch of engineering. The Society is organized into 22 chapters with members from across the United States, Brazil, Europe, United Kingdom, and Canada.

== History ==
The Society of Aeronautical Weight Engineers was organized in 1939 in Los Angeles, California, and was incorporated as a nonprofit organization April 2, 1941. As membership grew to include engineers associated with shipbuilding, land transportation, and other allied industries and technologies, the Society name was changed on January 1, 1973 to the Society of Allied Weight Engineers, Inc.

== Purpose ==
The Society offers to members and industry a medium for the pooling and exchange of data and experience at local and regional levels, fostering a higher degree of efficiency in Mass Properties Engineering topics. Regular chapter, regional and international meetings provide an opportunity for mass properties engineers to meet and to discuss mutual problems, procedures and specifications, thus broadening their individual horizons and becoming better informed. The aims of the Society are focused on several key areas, among which are:

- Providing a means for those interested in Mass Properties Engineering to work together to further their professional goals.
- Promoting recognition of Mass Properties Engineering as a specialized discipline in the entire spectrum of professional engineering.
- Serving as a medium for the exchange of current mass properties related techniques and state of the art improvements in the profession.
- Promoting the design and manufacture of optimum weight equipment, development of new materials, and improvements in the state of the art.
- Encouraging members to promote continuous improvement in the interrelations between mass properties engineers for mutual benefit.
- Publicly recognizing any person or organization that significantly enhances the professionalism of the Society or develops new technology that improves the state of the art of Mass Properties Engineering efficiencies.
- Promoting the inclusion of Mass Properties Engineering in the curriculum of study in institutions of higher learning.
- Providing training for those working in the field of Mass Properties Engineering.

== Mass property engineering ==
Mass Properties Engineers are creative thinkers who use math and science to solve problems. They come from a variety of backgrounds: aerospace engineering, ocean engineering, automotive engineering, naval architecture, materials engineering, mechanical engineering, math or physics; to name just a few. Still others come from operational backgrounds in the military, or other technical fields like teaching or production. However, they all share a common interest in making things work by successfully integrating the efforts from many diverse technical disciplines and blending them into an effective solution for all.

== Technical papers and publications ==
As noted, since 1939 the Society of Allied Weight Engineers has been promoting recognition of Mass Properties Engineering as a specialized discipline. One principal method of accomplishing this is to make technical content available to its members. The SAWE publishes technical papers and proceedings from International Conferences through its "Weight Engineering Journal" and on the Internet. The SAWE has produced college level text books covering aircraft and marine mass properties engineering. The SAWE also publishes the "Weight Engineer's Handbook", a collection of engineering formulas and data, used as a reference by engineers of all disciplines.

== Standards ==
The SAWE creates Standards and Recommended Practices for the mass properties design and acquisition communities. The SAWE is the professional society which integrates mass properties best practices across all the transportation sectors: air, sea, space, and ground. The Society Standards effort is international in scope and compliant with modern Open Development of Standards Processes. Recommended Practices will usually, though not always, arise out of the activity of groups within SAWE such as the Standards and Practices Committee. The Recommended Practices will represent the consensus and expertise of the group regarding such topics as design criteria, matters of procedure, etc.; which, when approved by the Board of Directors, are made available as Standard Practices Recommended by SAWE. The present list of Recommended Practices includes:

- RP1: Requirements for Aircraft On Board Weight and Balance System
- RP2: Guidelines for Mass Properties Control on International Space & Missile Systems
- RP5: Mass Properties Control System for Wheeled and Tracked Vehicles
- RP6: Standard Coordinate Systems for Reporting the Mass Properties of Flight Vehicles
- RP7: Mass Properties Management and Control for Military Aircraft
- RP8: Weight and Balance Data Reporting Forms for Aircraft (including Rotorcraft)
- RP9: Weight and Balance Control for Guided Missiles
- RP10: Weight and Balance Data Reporting Forms for Guided Missiles and Space Launch Vehicles
- RP11: Mass Properties Control for Space Vehicles
- RP12: Weight Control Technical Requirements for Surface Ships
- RP13: Standard Coordinate System for Reporting Mass Properties of Marine Vehicles
- RP14: Weight Estimating and Margin Manual for Marine Vehicles
- RP15: Vendor Weight Control for the Marine Industry
- RP16: Measurement of Missile and Spacecraft Mass Properties
- RP17: Weight Distribution and Moments of Inertia for Marine Vehicles
- RP100: Vendor Weight Control for the Aircraft Industry

Technical papers, textbooks, the handbook, and Recommended Practices are available for purchase from the Society on-line. Recommended Practices and technical papers are available free on-line to the Society members.

== Training and classes ==
The SAWE has developed and offered a number of unique training classes at Regional and International Conferences. These SAWE classes have been offered to further the educational development and broaden the experience of those engaged in the field of Mass Properties Engineering. The goal of the Society has been to offer training classes at a reasonable price so that the greatest number of the Societies membership can experience these opportunities. The SAWE will also present classes on-site through special arrangement, and has embarked on a program of on-line classes. The on-line classes include:

RP7 - Mass Properties Management and Control of Military Aircraft: This class will familiarize students with effective control of the weight and other mass properties of an aircraft. The class will also expose students to other considerations associated with mass properties management and control described in SAWE RP-07.

RP8 - Aircraft Weight Estimating and SAWE RP8: The objectives of this one-day course are to provide an overview of weight estimating methods and the weight estimating process for aircraft, and to provide insight into the weight and balance reporting formats and requirements of SAWE Recommended Practice 8.

Structural Optimization for Mass Properties Engineers: This class covers structural design and analysis considerations and their impact on Mass Properties. The course is for working engineers outside of the Stress or Loads organizations to provide insight into the decision tools and processes affecting structural integrity.

The complete list of classes given by the SAWE is as follows (for details see the SAWE training website referenced at end of this article):

- Advanced Mass Properties Measurement
- Airline Fleet Weight vs. Individual Weight
- Airline Fuel Conservation
- Airline Operations & CG Curtailment Guidelines
- Airline Weight and Balance Operations
- Aircraft Weight and Balance Class
- Aircraft Weight Estimating and Use of RP8 for Weight Allocation
- Automated Weight and Balance System (AWBS) Training
- Dynamic Balancing Course
- Exhibitor Technology Classes
- Helicopter Conceptual Design
- INCOSE Systems Engineering Handbook Tutorial
- Introduction to Aircraft Weighing
- Introduction to Naval Architecture
- Marine Systems Weight Estimating Methods Based on SAWE RP 14
- Marine Weight Control & Weight Estimating Methodology
- Marine Weight Control - Based on SAWE RP 12 & 14
- Measuring Mass Properties
- Principals of Mass Properties Management & Control for Military Aircraft – SAWE RP 07
- SAWE Conference Planning Committee Training
- SAWE International/Chapter Officer or Committee Chairman Orientation
- Ship Inclining Experiment
- Structural Analysis/Optimization

== Conferences and meetings ==
The SAWE sponsors a yearly International Conference which can be domestically (U.S.) hosted or hosted by a foreign chapter. The 2011 70th SAWE International Conference will be held in Houston, Texas on 14–19 May, and the 2012 71st SAWE International Conference will be held in Manching, Germany. Local chapters, of which there are 22 in number, can also sponsor Regional Conferences, such as the 2010 South West Regional to be held in Ventura, California 12–13 November. Such conferences typically involve presentations of technical papers, displays by venders, officer meetings, training classes, awards ceremonies, and various social activities.

== Competitions and awards ==
Honorary Fellow: Honorary Fellowship is awarded to persons who have achieved eminence in Mass Properties Engineering or who have made outstanding contributions to the advancement of the Society.

Fellow: Fellowship is awarded to persons who have achieved distinction in the field of Mass Properties Engineering or who have materially contributed to the advancement of the Society.

Ed Payne Award: The Ed Payne Award is presented to young engineers, under the age of 35 at time of application, who have made significant contributions to the SAWE or the mass properties engineering profession.

L. R. "Mike" Hackney Award: The L. R. "Mike" Hackney Award is given to the author or authors of the best technical paper presented at the International Conference. Papers are judged for technical content, originality, usefulness, value, clarity, style, and form. Balloting is by each member of the Technical Committee.

Special Merit Award: Occasionally an award is given due to the significance of an achievement or the exceptional merit of a technical paper.

SAWE Scholarship: The SAWE has also established a scholarship fund for engineering students with the principal growing by donations from individuals, chapters, and corporations as well as by sale of our popular Introduction to Weight Engineering textbook. To date, the Society has established endowments at three universities; each provides $1,000 scholarships annually. The first such scholarship was endowed at the University of Texas at Arlington by the Texas Chapter in 1989. The Society has also endowed permanent annual scholarships at West Virginia University in 1999 and at Wichita State University in 2000. In addition, a scholarship award of $1,000 has been given annually since 1994 to an engineering student interested in mass properties engineering at a university within the geographic area of the annual International Conference. The SAWE chapter that hosts the annual International Conference selects the university receiving this annual scholarship money.

The SAWE introduced a scholarship program in 2002 for children and grandchildren of SAWE members who plan to continue their education in college. This program annually distributes scholarships to children of SAWE members. Scholarships are offered for full-time undergraduate course of study at an accredited four-year college or university in a curriculum of the student's choice.

Frank Fong Scholarship: The SAWE/Frank Fong Memorial Scholarship was established by SAWE and the family of SAWE past-President Frank Fong in 2005. The requirements are the same as the SAWE Scholarship, but this scholarship is dedicated to students enrolled in a technical course of study (e.g.: engineering, physics, mathematics, computer sciences, etc.).

== Notable members ==
Louis B. Popovich (Author of “Weight Engineering, Design Techniques for Weight Reduction”).

Richard Boynton (Founder of Space Electronics INC, namesake of the Richard Boynton Lifetime Achievement Award).

Edward L. Payne (Charter Member of the SAWE who mentored many early young members of the Society, namesake of the Ed Payne Award for young engineers who have made significant contributions).

Lyle R. "Mike" Hackney (Charter Member and co-founder of the SAWE, served as the first president of the Society and chaired the very first conference, namesake of the L. R. Hackney Award for best technical paper presented at International Conference)
