= SOV =

SOV may refer to:

- SOV, a former ticker symbol for Sovereign Bank
- SOV, a legal cryptocurrency created by the Sovereign Currency Act of 2018 of the Republic of the Marshall Islands
- SOV, the National Rail station code for Southend Victoria railway station, Southend-on-Sea, England
- SO Voiron, a French rugby union club
- Schedule of values
- Shot-on-video film
- Single-occupancy vehicle
- Subject–object–verb, used in linguistic typology
- Symphony Orchestra Vorarlberg, an Austrian orchestra
- Share of voice
- Sorin Ovidiu Vântu, a Romanian business man
- Store of value
- Strength of victory, the combined record of all teams beaten in a schedule in the NFL
