= SRAM =

SRAM may refer to:

== Technology ==
- Static random-access memory, a type of semiconductor memory that uses bistable latching circuitry to store each bit
- Shadow random access memory, for faster ROM chip access

=== Short-range attack missile ===
- AGM-69 SRAM, a Boeing nuclear air-to-surface missile
  - AGM-131 SRAM II, a nuclear air-to-surface missile intended as a replacement

== Other uses ==
- SRAM Corporation, a manufacturer of bicycle components
- Sram (Croatian TV series), a teen drama first broadcast in 2024
- Scientific Review of Alternative Medicine, a peer-reviewed journal devoted exclusively to analyzing the claims of alternative medicine
- Service régional d'admission du Montréal métropolitain, a network of Quebec CEGEPs
- Squash Racquets Association of Malaysia
