= Special Escort Group =

Special Escort Group may refer to:

- Special Escort Group (Metropolitan Police), London
- Special Escort Group (Ministry of Defence Police), for nuclear materials transit, United Kingdom

== See also ==
- Escorts Group, engineering firm
- Escort group, World War II allied North Atlantic convoy escort package
- Mid-Ocean Escort Force, World War II allied North Atlantic escort resources
