= SREL =

SREL may refer to:

- The Savannah River Ecology Laboratory, a research unit of the University of Georgia located in Aiken, South Carolina
- Service de Renseignement de l’État Luxembourgeois, the Luxembourgish homeland intelligence agency
