= SJM =

SJM is an abbreviation of:

- Swadeshi Jagaran Manch
- Svalbard and Jan Mayen, archipelago of Norway, ISO 3166-1 alpha-3 code
- Servi Jesu et Mariae
- Samyukta Janamorcha Nepal
- Super Junior-M

in business:

- The NYSE symbol for The J.M. Smucker Co.
- Sociedade de Jogos de Macau, casino subsidiary of Sociedade de Turismo e Diversões de Macau
