= SLT =

SLT may refer to:

== Medicine ==
- Selective laser trabeculoplasty, an eye surgery
- Speech and language therapy

== Technology ==
- Compaq SLT, a laptop computer line of the 1980s and 1990s
- Sony SLT camera, a 2010s digital camera type
- IBM Solid Logic Technology, a 1960s hybrid integrated circuit design
- Sri Lanka Telecom, a telephone company
- slt, Set Less Than, a RISC-V instruction

== Transportation ==
- Harriet Alexander Field, an airfield in Colorado, US (IATA code)
- Mercedes-Benz SLT-Class, a car model (built 1996–2020)
- South Lancs Travel, an English bus operator
- Sprinter Lighttrain, a Dutch electric train class (built 2007–2012)

== Other uses ==
- Slovenian tolar, defunct currency
- Situational leadership theory, of organizations
- Les Soulèvements de la Terre, French environmental collective
- Smith's Literal Translation of the Bible
- Social learning theory, a psychological explanation for behaviour
- Specific-locus test, a mouse assay for measuring mutations from radiation or chemical treatments
