= SDSS =

SDSS may refer to:

- Sloan Digital Sky Survey, a major multi-filter imaging and spectroscopic redshift survey
- Social Democratic Party of Slovakia
- Spatial Decision Support System, a GIS based decision aiding system
- Independent Democratic Serb Party, a political party of Croatian Serbs (Samostalna demokratska srpska stranka in Serbo-Croatian)
- South Delta Secondary School, a school in Delta, British Columbia, Canada
