= SLP =

SLP may refer to:

== Science and technology ==
- Sea level pressure
- FN Self-Loading Police, an FN Herstal shotgun
- Super long play, a speed format for VHS videotapes
- Systematic Layout Planning, in Management and Organisational science

=== Medicine ===
- Speech-language pathology

=== Computing ===
- Service Location Protocol, a service discovery protocol
- Straight-line program, in computational algebra
- Successive linear programming
- System Locked Pre-installation

== Places ==
- St. Louis Park, Minnesota
- Spring Lake Park, Minnesota
- Satish Dhawan Space Centre Second Launch Pad, Sriharikota, India
- Ponciano Arriaga International Airport, by IATA airport code
- San Luis Potosi, a city and state in Mexico.

== Organizations ==
- Scottish limited partnership
- SLP College, Leeds, England
- Saba Labour Party
- Saint Lucia Labour Party
- Samoa Labour Party
- Socialist Labour Party (disambiguation)
- Socialist Left Party (Austria)
- Social Liberal Party (Belgium)
- South London Press, a local newspaper

== Music ==
- The S.L.P., a music project by Sergio Lorenzo Pizzorno
- Marwan (rapper), formerly known as Statsløs Palæstinenser
