= SCG =

SCG may refer to:

- Syrian caretaker government, the caretaker provisional government of Syria from 8 December 2024 to 29 March 2025
- Saban Capital Group, a private investment firm founded in 2001 by Haim Saban based in Los Angeles, California focused on media, entertainment, and communications investments
- SCG (Serbo-Croatian: Srbija i Crna Gora), the ISO 3166-1 alpha-3 code for the former union of Serbia and Montenegro, which peacefully split in 2006 into two countries
- SCG International Risk, a private military contractor and security firm
- Screen Cartoonist's Guild
- Scuderia Cameron Glickenhaus, an American high-performance car manufacturer
- Semiconductor Components Group, a Motorola spinoff of its semiconductor department
- Self-Changing Gears, a British company
- Seychelles Coast Guard
- Shanghai Construction Group, a Chinese construction and engineering firm
- Siam Cement Group, the largest cement manufacturer in Thailand and patron of SCG Muangthong United
- Socialist Campaign Group, a left-wing grouping of UK Labour Party MPs
- Southern Connecticut Gas Company
- Stone Crossing railway station, Kent, England (National Rail station code)
- Stuart MacGill, former Australian cricketer
- SCG, the subcubic graph function, a variation of Friedman's SSCG function, in mathematics
- Summa contra Gentiles, a Christian studies book
- Superior cervical ganglion, the largest of the cervical ganglia
- Sydney Cricket Ground, a sports stadium in Sydney, New South Wales, Australia
- Sun City Girls, a now defunct United States experimental band
