= SBCT =

SBCT may refer to:

- Stryker Brigade Combat Team, a mechanized infantry force in the U.S. Army
- San Benito County Transit, California, U.S.
- Afonso Pena International Airport (ICAO: SBCT), Curitiba, Brazil,
