= SXM =

SXM may refer to:

- SXM (computational model), model for a Stream X-Machine
- SXM (socket), a physical computer interface used by Nvidia computational GPU modules
- sxm, file extension for math files from StarOffice's StarMath (version 1–7) and OpenOffice.org XML (version 1)
- SxM, formats of scanning microscope image handled by Image SXM
- SXM inc, a digital studio producing online entertainment for brands
- Sirius XM Radio's NYSE symbol
- SxM, a 1994 album by Sangue Misto
- Starbury SXM, a basketball shoe
- Sint Maarten's ISO 3166-1 alpha-3 code
  - Sint Maarten national football team's FIFA code
  - Princess Juliana International Airport's IATA code
- Servicios Aéreos Especializados Mexicanos's ICAO code
