= SCCM =

SCCM may refer to:

== Organizations ==
- Society of Critical Care Medicine, an organization dedicated to the practice of critical nursing care
- Sichuan Conservatory of Music, a music institution in China
- SCC Mohammédia, a Moroccan football club
- Southwestern College of Christian Ministries, US

== Science and technology ==
- SCCM (flow unit) (standard cubic centimeters per minute), a flow measurement term
- System Center Configuration Manager, a software system that has been renamed to Microsoft Configuration Manager
- Shock Compression of Condensed Matter, a unit of the American Physical Society

== See also ==
- CHRNA1 or SCCMS, a protein
- Software configuration management (SCM)
