= SRB =

SRB or Srb may refer to:

== Places ==
- Serbia (ISO 3166-1 alpha-3 country code SRB), a country in Central/Southeastern Europe
- Srb, a village in Croatia

== Organizations ==
- Special Response Battalion, law enforcement and internal security unit of the Bangladesh Police.
- State Research Bureau (organisation), former Ugandan intelligence agency
- Single Resolution Board, EU banking authority

== Science and technology ==
- Storage Resource Broker, a computer data grid management system
- Sulfate-reducing bacteria
- Sulfur-reducing bacteria
- Service Request Block, in IBM operating systems
- Solid rocket booster
- SRb, a subtype of semiregular variable star
- Swedish Red-and-White or Svensk Röd och Vit Boskap, a breed of cattle

== Other uses ==
- Sonic's Rendezvous Band, Ann Arbor, Michigan, US
- Srb (surname)
- Sora language (ISO 639-3 code srb), a Munda language of India
