= STK =

STK may refer to:

- Soumitrisha Kundu, an Indian actress who works in Bengali film and television industry
- Saint Kitts and Nevis, UNDP country code
- FC ŠTK 1914 Šamorín, a Slovak football club
- Save the Kids token, a 2021 cryptocurrency pump and dump scheme
- Shoot to Kill, former name for the professional Halo team Final Boss
- SIM Application Toolkit, a part of GSM telephony standard responsible for applications stored on SIM
- Soo Teck LRT station, Punggol, Singapore (LRT station abbreviation)
- STK Steakhouse, a modern high-end steakhouse chain
- ST Kinetics, a Singapore-based arms manufacturer
- Státní technická knihovna (State Library of Technology), 1960–2009 name of the NTK (Czech National Library of Technology)
- Storage Technology Corporation (StorageTek), a data storage company acquired in 2005 by Sun Microsystems
- SuperTuxKart, an arcade racing game
- Synthesis Toolkit, a cross-platform library in C++ for sound synthesis and physical modelling
- Systems Tool Kit (formerly Satellite Tool Kit), an astrodynamics computer program from Analytical Graphics, Inc.
