= SMX =

SMX may refer to:

As an abbreviation:

- Honda S-MX, a minivan
- Singapore Mercantile Exchange
- S.M.X., director of Revelation at the 1999 New York Underground Film Festival
- SMX (operating system), a Unix-like simulator on SPARC, the "SunOS/Solaris MINIX"
- SMX Convention Center (company), an events venue management company in the Philippines
  - SMX Convention Center Manila, Pasay, Philippines
- SmX RNA and SmY RNA, ribonucleic acids in nematode worms
- Spatial multiplexing, MIMO wireless transmission technique
- Standard Musical Expression, a representation of simple music in ASCII used in QBasic and other software
- StepManiaX, a rhythm game by Step Revolution
- Sulfamethoxazole, an antibiotic
- SuperMotocross World Championship, the premier combined discipline of American off-road motorcycle racing.

As a code:

- Santa Maria Public Airport, in California, US, IATA code
- C.A.I. First, regional Italian airline, ICAO airline code
- SMTC Corporation, Canada, TSX/Toronto ticker code
- Sanmenxia city in Henan, China, governmental code SMX
- Sendmail X, now MeTA1, mail server coded smX
- Special Mobile Machine—Exempt, prefix SMX, on vehicle registration plates of Colorado
