= SMZ =

SMZ may refer to:

As an abbreviation:

- SMZ cyclecar, a Soviet microcar
- Sulfamethazine, an antibiotic whose abbreviations include SMZ
- Sulfamethoxazole, an antibiotic whose abbreviations include SMZ
- Silver Mt. Zion, root of the many names of a Canadian band abbreviated SMZ
- Saber Marionette Z, fictional manga/anime character in Saber Marionette
- South Manchuria Railway Zone, in China, abbreviated SMR, also called SMZ
- SMZ connector, a miniature-type RF connector
- Stoomvaart Maatschappij Zeeland (1875–1989), ship company now owned by Stena Line Holland BV
- Serpukhovskiy Moto Zavod (Serpukov Motor Factory), Russian factory of SeAZ's SZ cycle-car
- Southern Marginal Zone, in South Africa and Zimbabwe, part of the Limpopo Belt
- Schloegl Mang Zender (SMZ 250), a machine designed for motorcycle racer Anton Mang

As a code:

- Stoelmans Eiland Airstrip, an airport in Surinam, IATA code SMZ
- RAF Scampton, a Royal Air Force station in the UK, ICAO airline designator SMZ
- Sarai Mir, a town and railway station in India, station code SMZ
- Sisak–Moslavina County (Sisačko-Moslavačka Županija), in Croatia, locally abbreviated SMZ
- Simeku language or Simeku, a South Bougainville language (East Papua), ISO 639-3 language code smz

== See also ==
- Co-trimoxazole, an antibiotic abbreviated TMP-SMX, also called TMP-SMZ
