= SIGCAT =

SIGCAT (Special Interest Group on CD Applications and Technology) was a special interest group founded in 1986 by Jerry McFaul, an employee of the US Geological Survey. It became the world's largest CD-ROM users' group, with over 11,000 members in 75 countries. SIGCAT held annual conferences until 1999.

In 2002, SIGCAT discovered that it had let its domain name, www.sigcat.org, expire, and that the name had been reregistered by a pornography site operator.

Around 2002, SIGCAT was absorbed into the DVD Association (DVDA), an organization that had sprung from the CD Interactive Association (CDIA).
