= SDG (disambiguation) =

An SDG is a Sustainable Development Goal set by the United Nations.

SDG may also refer to:

== Organizations ==
- SDG Associates, an American architectural firm
- Serb Volunteer Guard, a defunct paramilitary unit
- Soli Deo Gloria (record label)
- Swarm Development Group, American non-profit
- Gabonese Social Democrats, (French: Sociaux-Démocrates Gabonais), political party in Gabon

== Other uses ==
- Secoisolariciresinol diglucoside, an anti-oxidant phytochemical
- Soli Deo gloria (S.D.G.), Latin term for "Glory to God alone"
- Sudanese pound (ISO 4217 code)
- United Counties of Stormont, Dundas and Glengarry, a municipality in Ontario, Canada
