= Screen name =

Screen name may refer to:

- Stage name, a pseudonym used for film appearances
- User (computing), a computer or network user, identified by a username
- Online identity, a social identity established by an Internet user
