= SLB (disambiguation) =

SLB is the trade name and ticker symbol of Schlumberger Limited, an energy services company.

SLB may also refer to:

- Sustainability-linked bond, a type of financial asset
- Single letter beacon, radio transmissions of a single repeating Morse code letter
- S.L. Benfica, a Portuguese sports club based in Lisbon
- SLB Radio Productions, Inc., producers of radio program The Saturday Light Brigade
- Scytalidopepsin B, a proteolytic enzyme
- Sigma Lambda Beta, US fraternity
- Solomon Islands, ISO-3166-1 alpha-3 code
- Sport Laulara e Benfica, an East Timorese football team
- Storm Lake Municipal Airport, Iowa, US, IATA code
- Strongside linebacker in American and Canadian football
- Supported lipid bilayers
- Swedish Friesian or Svensk Låglandsboskap, a Swedish breed of dairy cattle
- SLB Films, Bollywood film production company by Sanjay Leela Bhansali
- Super League Basketball, a British basketball league
- Super League Basketball (women), a British basketball league
- Syriac Lions Battalions, nickname for Kataib Rouh Allah Issa Ibn Miriam
