= SGP =

SGP may refer to:

== Events ==
- Secret Garden Party, a UK music festival
- Speedway Grand Prix, a series of motorcycling contests
- Symposium on Geometry Processing, of European Association For Computer Graphics

== Organisations ==
=== Businesses ===
- Simmering-Graz-Pauker, an Austrian machine/vehicle manufacturer
- Stockland Corporation Limited, an Australian property developer (ASX ticker: SGP)
- SpyGlass Pharma, (NASDAQ ticker: SGP)

=== Political parties ===
- Reformed Political Party (Staatkundig Gereformeerde Partij), the Netherlands
- Socialist Equality Party (Sozialistische Gleichheitspartei), Germany
- Scottish Green Party, Scotland

=== Professional associations ===
- Sociedad de Gestión de Productores Fonográficos del Paraguay, for Paraguayan record producers
- Society of General Physiologists, for biomedical scientists

== Science ==
- Simplified General Perturbations model, for orbital calculations
- Social Golfer Problem, a problem in discrete mathematics

== Transport ==
- Shay Gap Airport, IATA airport code "SGP"
- Schweizer SGP 1-1, an American glider
- Subaru Global Platform, unibody automobile platform

== Other uses ==
- Savannah Ghost Pirates, ice hockey team
- SGP, the ISO 3166-1 alpha-3 country code for Singapore
- sgp, the ISO 639-3 code for the Singpho dialect
- Stability and Growth Pact, the main EU fiscal agreement
- SpaceGhostPurrp, American rapper and record producer
