= SPST =

SPST may refer to:

- Saint Paul School of Theology, a school of higher learning in Kansas City, Missouri, United States
- Cad. FAP Guillermo del Castillo Paredes Airport's ICAO code
- Single pole, single throw, a type of electrical switch
