= SLI =

SLI may refer to:

== Science and technology ==
- Safe Load Indicator, in cranes
- SLI battery, used in automotives
- Space Launch Initiative, a US project
- Specific language impairment, a medical diagnosis
- Symmetric level-index arithmetic, in mathematics

=== Computing ===
- Scalable Link Interface, for connecting multiple Nvidia video cards
- Scan-Line Interleave, for connecting multiple 3dfx video cards
- Service level indicator, a measure performance from a service provider

== Organizations ==
- SAP Labs India, the Indian subsidiary of SAP AG
- SLI Systems, a software company in New Zealand
- Sylvania Lighting International
- Southwestern Louisiana Institute, of Liberal and Technical Learning, US
- Somerset Light Infantry, a former regiment in the British Army

== Other uses ==
- Sensory Logical Introvert, a type in the socionics pseudoscientific theory
- Swiss Leader Index, a market index
- Street light interference, a pseudoscientific idea
- Supplemental Liability Insurance, for car rental
