= SCNT =

SCNT may refer to:

- Société Nationale de Contrôle Technique (Luxembourg)
- Somatic cell nuclear transfer
- Suez Canal Net Ton, a unique unit of measurement representing the revenue-earning capacity of a vessel
- Sun Kwang Newport Container Terminal
