= SHP =

SHP or shp may refer to:

- Saint Helena pound, currency
- Sacred Heart Preparatory (Atherton, California), a US school
- Samoczynne Hamowanie Pociągu, a train protection system in Poland
- Sandy Hook Promise, a gun violence prevention organization
- Seton Hall Preparatory School, West Orange, New Jersey, US
- Shaft horsepower
- Shapefile, for GIS software
- Shek Pai stop (MTR station code), Hong Kong
- Shepparton railway station, Australia
- Shepperton railway station (National Rail station code), Surrey, England
- Shipibo language (ISO 639-3 code), Peru and Brazil
- Small heterodimer partner, a protein
- Small hydro power plant
- Social Democratic People's Party (Turkey) (Sosyaldemokrat Halk Partisi), 2002-2010
- Social Democratic Populist Party (Turkey) (Sosyaldemokrat Halkçı Parti), 1985-1995
- State Highway Patrol
- Strategic Hamlet Program, during Vietnam War
- Swanson Health Products, US
- Qinhuangdao Shanhaiguan Airport, China, IATA code
- Columbia University Science Honors Program
