= SRG =

SRG can refer to:

- SRG Global, Inc., an American plastic parts manufacturer
- Somaliland Regional Games, multi-sport event in Somaliland
- Swiss Broadcasting Corporation (SRG SSR)
- St Richard Gwyn Catholic High School, Flint
- Special Republican Guard, in Ba'athist Iraq
- Syrian Republican Guard, a Syrian military force
- Former Surinamese gulden, ISO 4217 code
- Stirling Radioisotope Generator, electricity generator for space applications
- Strongly regular graph, a mathematical concept
- Socialist Review Group of the UK Socialist Workers Party
- IATA airport code for Achmad Yani Airport, Semarang, Indonesia
- National Rail station code for Seer Green and Jordans railway station, Buckinghamshire, England
- Spektr-RG, a Russian space observatory
- Strategic Response Group of the New York City Police Department
