= SCAP =

SCAP may refer to:

- S.C.A.P., an early French manufacturer of cars and engines
- Security Content Automation Protocol
- The Shackled City Adventure Path, a role-playing game
- SREBP cleavage-activating protein
- Supervisory Capital Assessment Program, a series of bank stress tests
- Supreme Commander for the Allied Powers, a position held by General Douglas MacArthur during the Occupation of Japan following World War II
