= SIPP =

SIPP may refer to:

- Self-invested personal pension, a type of United Kingdom pension plan
- Simple Internet Protocol Plus, former name of IPv6
- SIPP memory, single in-line pin package, a type of computer memory
- Standard Interline Passenger Procedure, ACRISS vehicle category codes
- Survey of Income and Program Participation, a survey of household income and transfer payments
- SIPp, test tool / traffic generator for Session Initiation Protocol
- "The Sipp" or Sipp, shortened form of Mississippi, a state of the United States of America
- Stable Image Platform Program initiative from Intel
