= SWT =

SWT may refer to:

- Subhanahu wa ta'ala, Arabic for "The most glorified, the most high", Muslim honorific for Allah
- Sweetener World Tour, a 2019 tour by Ariana Grande
- Smash World Tour, a discontinued esports tournament circuit for the Super Smash Bros. series
- Somerset West and Taunton, a former district of Somerset, England between 2019 and 2023
- Southwest Texas State University, former name of Texas State University

== Science and technology ==
- Stationary wavelet transform, a wavelet transform algorithm
- Standard Widget Toolkit, a graphical widget toolkit for use with the Java platform
- Stepped-wedge trial, a type of randomised controlled trial

== Transport ==
- Slaithwaite railway station, England; National Rail station code
- South West Trains, a former train operating company in southern England
- Srowot railway station, Indonesia; station code
- the ICAO airline code for Swiftair

== Wildlife trusts ==
- Sheldrick Wildlife Trust, elephant rescue and rehabilitation program in Kenya
- Scottish Wildlife Trust

=== Royal Society of Wildlife Trusts ===
- Shropshire Wildlife Trust
- Somerset Wildlife Trust
- Staffordshire Wildlife Trust
- Suffolk Wildlife Trust
- Surrey Wildlife Trust
- Sussex Wildlife Trust
