= SWF (disambiguation) =

SWF (ShockWave Flash / Small Web Format) is an Adobe Flash file format.

SWF may also refer to:

== Languages and literature ==
- Sere language, by ISO 639-3 language code
- Standard Written Form of the Cornish language
- SWF Seeks Same a 1990 novel by John Lutz
- Sydney Writers' Festival, an annual literary festival in Sydney, Australia

== Other uses ==
- Scottish Women's Football, the governing body for women's association football in Scotland
- Sentro ng Wikang Filipino, Center for the Filipino Language
- Sovereign wealth fund, a state-owned investment fund
- Spring Web Flow, a software project for rich web applications
- Stewart International Airport (IATA code), Hudson Valley, New York, US
- Stockholm Water Foundation, organisation that presents the annual Stockholm Water Prize
- Street Woman Fighter, a Korean dance survival show
- Südwestfunk, a former German radio station
