= SRL =

SRL or S.R.L. may refer to:

- a designation equivalent to limited liability company, that may be appended to the end of company names:
  - Società a responsabilità limitata (Italian)
  - Sociedad de responsabilidad limitada (Spanish)
  - Societate cu răspundere limitată (Romanian)
  - Société à responsabilité limitée (French)
- Semantic role labeling, an activity of natural language processing
- Sarcalumenin, human protein that regulates calcium transport
- Shift register lookup table, a component in digital circuitry
- Student Rugby League, UK
- Semiconductor ring laser, a type of laser
- Sri Lanka, UNDP country code
- Statistical relational learning, a subdiscipline of artificial intelligence
- Suburban Rail Loop, a proposed rail line in Melbourne, Australia
- Survival Research Laboratories, a machine performance art group from San Francisco, California
- Self-regulated learning, a psychological concept related to metacognition
- Spaced repetition learning, a flashcard-based technique for learning and memorization
- agus araile (see Irish orthography#Abbreviations)
- Stimulated Raman Loss, a sub-type of Stimulated Raman spectroscopy
- Palo Verde Airport IATA code
- srl, Shift Right Logical, a RISC-V instruction
