= STB =

STB or StB may refer to:

== Entertainment ==
- Shoot the Bullet, 2005 bullet hell photography game and the 9.5th installment in the Touhou Project series
- Star Trek Beyond, a 2016 film
- STB (TV channel), Ukrainian TV channel

== Organisations ==
- Sabah Tourism Board
- Sarawak Tourism Board
- Simpson Thacher & Bartlett, law firm
- Singapore Tourism Board
- Societatea de Transport București, a public transport operator in Romania
- STB Le Havre (Saint Thomas Basket Le Havre), a French basketball club
- StB, Czechoslovak secret police
- Stubai Valley Railway, Tyrol, Austria, line number
- Süd-Thüringen-Bahn, a railway company, Thuringia, Germany
- Surface Transportation Board, US federal regulator

== Other uses ==
- Bachelor of Sacred Theology (Sacrae Theologiae Baccalaureus), a degree
- Set-top box, TV tuner feeding TV receiver
- Setiabudi MRT station, a rapid transit station in Jakarta, Indonesia
- STB Systems, a defunct graphics card manufacturer
- STB, the prototype designation of the Type 74 Japanese main battle tank
- Steuerberater (StB), German tax advisor license
- Strut bar, an automotive suspension element
- Supertropical bleach, a frequent component of chemical warfare decontamination foam
