= SLR =

SLR may refer to:

== Science and technology ==
- Satellite laser ranging, a method to measure the distance to satellites
- Scalable Linear Recording tape drive backup
- Scanline rendering
- Sea level rise
- Self-loading rifle or semi-automatic rifle
  - The UK L1A1 SLR rifle
- Semi-linear resolution, a search algorithm
- Sending loudness rating for microphones
- Service List Registry, of audiovisual services
- Simple linear regression, a method of statistical modeling
- Simple LR parser (simple left-to-right parser), a method of syntax analysis
- Single-lens reflex camera
  - See also: Digital single-lens reflex camera (digital SLR or DSLR)
- SLR (company), a virtual reality company
- Systematic literature review (see also Systematic review), a type of academic text

== Transport ==
- Holden Torana SLR5000 car
- Mercedes-Benz 300 SLR
- Mercedes-Benz SLR McLaren
- Shimano Linear Response, a bicycle component
- Sri Lanka Railways
- St. Lawrence and Atlantic Railroad reporting mark

== Other uses ==
- Sébastien Loeb Racing, a French racing team
- Stanford Law Review
- Statutory liquidity ratio
- Salar language, ISO 639-3 code: slr
