= Self-propelled =

Self-propelled may refer to

- Human-powered transport, humans moving themselves (and their cargo) via their own muscle energy
- Machines that power their own movement:
  - Automobile (from auto- + mobile, "self-moving")
  - Locomotive (from loco- + motive, "moving from its current place")
  - Mechanized vehicle, armoured self-propelled platform for use in mechanized warfare
  - Multiple units, self-propelled train carriages
  - Self-propelled artillery
    - Self-propelled gun
    - Self-propelled anti-aircraft weapon
    - Self-propelled anti-tank gun (aka tank destroyer)
    - Anti-tank missile carrier, a self-propelled anti-tank missile system
    - Assault gun, a self-propelled infantry support gun
    - Mortar carrier, a self-propelled mortar
  - Self-propelled modular transporter
  - Leonardo's self-propelled cart
  - Self-propelled barge T-36
- Self-propelled particles, a model for studying the motion of swarms
