= SWP =

SWP or swp may refer to:

== Businesses and organisations ==
- California State Water Project, an American public utility
- German Institute for International and Security Affairs (German: Stiftung Wissenschaft und Politik)
- Saskatchewan Wheat Pool, Canadian grain firm
- Socialist Workers Party (disambiguation), various political parties
- South Wales Police, a British constabulary
- Southwest Pennsylvania Railroad, United States (by reporting mark)
- SWAPO, political party and former independence movement in Namibia, obsolete UNDP country code
- Wikimedia Polska (Polish: Stowarzyszenie Wikimedia Polska)
- Association "Polish Community", (Polish: Stowarzyszenie "Wspólnota Polska")

== Computing ==
- Scientific WorkPlace, a mathematics tool with LaTeX support
- Single Wire Protocol
- .swp, a swap file used by Vim

== Publications ==
- PEF Survey of Palestine, a series of maps (1872–1880)
- Südwest Presse, a German newspaper (founded 1946)

== Other uses ==
- Skill with prize, a category of slot machine
- Sherwin-Williams Paints, a line of paint sold by Sherwin-Williams
- Swiss Water Process, a method of coffee decaffeination
