= SHF =

SHF may refer to:

== Science and technology ==
- Simian hemorrhagic fever virus, a disease in monkeys
- Src homology 2 domain containing F, a protein
- Super high frequency, a radio frequency band

== Transport ==
- Sydney Heritage Fleet, an Australian ship preservation body
- Sheffield station, England
- Shihezi Huayuan Airport, China

== Other uses ==
- Singapore Heart Foundation, a health charity
- Skara HF, a Swedish handball club
- Société de l'histoire de France, a French history society
- Souther–Hillman–Furay Band, an American country rock band
