= SLOC =

SLOC may refer to:

- Salt Lake Organizing Committee, the organization responsible for the 2002 Winter Olympics in Salt Lake City, Utah
- Schenectady Light Opera Company, a nonprofit community theater organization in Schenectady, New York
- Secured line of credit, a type of credit source extended to a government, business or individual by a bank or other financial institution
- security link over coax, one type of ethernet over coax
- Sea lines of communication, the primary maritime routes between ports, used for trade, logistics and naval forces
- Source lines of code, a software metric used to measure the size of a software program
