= State of Play =

State of play may refer to:

- State of Play (band), a 1980s band that preceded 1990s British band Curve
- State of Play (video program), a series of video programs by Sony, mainly focused on PlayStation titles
- State of Play (TV series), a 2003 BBC political thriller series
  - State of Play (film), a 2009 American film based on the BBC series
