= SSV =

SSV may refer to:

- SSV (band), a German techno music group
- Soviet command ship SSV-33
- Special Service Vehicles (SSVs), North American police vehicles
- Small saphenous vein
- SSV (game architecture), by SETA, Sammy, and Visco
- SSV Helsinki, a Finnish floorball team
- Side-by-side (vehicle), small off-road vehicle
- Strategic Sealift Vessel (Philippine Navy)
- Simian sarcoma virus
- SSV1, in Fuselloviridae
- Statens skola för vuxna, a former Sweden school for adult education
- SSV, the Hull classification symbol for Submarine aircraft carriers in the U.S. Navy (never used)
