= SHAC (disambiguation) =

SHAC redirects to Stop Huntingdon Animal Cruelty, an international campaign against animal testing.

It may also refer to:

- Second Historical Archives of China, in Nanjing, Jiangsu, China
- Society for the History of Alchemy and Chemistry

== See also ==
- Shack
- Shak (disambiguation)
