= SVN =

SVN or svn may refer to:

== Businesses and organizations ==
- 7 Days Inn (former NYSE ticker symbol), a Chinese budget hotel chain
- CoogTV, formerly Student Video Network, a student-operated television station at the University of Houston
- Social Venture Network, a social responsibility network
- Swami Vivekanand University, Madhya Pradesh, or Sri Vivekanand Niji University, a university in India
- SVN, a British vocal group consisting of Aimie Atkinson, Alexia McIntosh, Grace Mouat, Millie O'Connell, Natalie Paris, Maiya Quansah-Breed, and Jarnéia Richard-Noel
- SVN Zweibrücken, a German association football club from Zweibrücken, Rhineland-Palatinate
- Together for the Netherlands (Samen voor Nederland), a Dutch political party
- Space Vision Network, the former name of Japanese television channel Gaora

== Places ==
- Hunter Army Airfield (IATA code), Savannah, Georgia, United States
- Slovenia (ISO 3166-1 alpha-3 country code)
- South Vietnam, a former state
- State of Vietnam, a former state of the French Union

== Science and technology ==
- Apache Subversion, abbreviated as SVN and its protocol svn://, a software versioning and revision control system
- Space Vehicle Number, a serial number for Global Positioning System satellites; see list of GPS satellites
- SVN-98, a variant of the KSVK 12.7 Russian sniper rifle
