= SVD =

SVD may stand for:

== Geography ==
- Argyle International Airport (IATA airport code SVD) on Saint Vincent island

== Mathematics ==
- Singular value decomposition of a matrix in mathematics

== Media ==
- Svenska Dagbladet (SvD), a Swedish newspaper
- The Club of the Big Deed (S.V.D. - Soyuz velikogo dela), a 1927 Soviet film

== Medicine ==
- Spontaneous vaginal delivery, a type of birth
- Swine vesicular disease
- Small vessel disease, of blood vessels

== Popular culture ==
- Sander van Doorn (b. 1979), Dutch DJ

== Religion ==
- Society of the Divine Word (Societas Verbi Divini), a Roman Catholic religious order

== Science and technology ==
- Saturation vapor density
- Semi-virtual diskette, emulating a floppy drive
- Simultaneous voice and data, in telecommunications

== Weapons ==
- SVD (rifle) (Russian: Snayperskaya Vintovka Dragunova), a Soviet marksman rifle.
