= SSDC =

SSDC may refer to:

- SSDC, Inc., a games publisher based in New York state
- Society of Stage Directors and Choreographers, former name of SDC, a national labor union in the theatrical entertainment industry
- South Somerset District Council
- Single steel drilling caisson
