= SSW =

SSW may refer to:

- South-southwest, a compass direction (one of the eight "half-winds")
- SSW (TV station), the callsign of a TV station in the South West and Great Southern regions of Western Australia
- Seminary of the Southwest, an Episcopal seminary in Austin, Texas, USA
- St. Louis Southwestern Railway, reporting mark SSW
- South Schleswig Voter Federation, German: Südschleswigscher Wählerverband
- Schichau Seebeckwerft, a German shipbuilding corporation
- Siemens-Schuckertwerke, a German electrical engineering company
- Special Service Wing, a special forces unit of the Pakistan Air Force
- Sudden stratospheric warming, a meteorological phenomenon in the upper troposphere
- Sutton SignWriting, a writing system for sign languages invented in 1974 by Valerie Sutton
- Southern States Wrestling, a professional wrestling promotion
- Swati language ISO 639 code
- Samsung White, former League of Legends team
- Seam-shifted wake, an aerodynamic phenomenon involving baseballs
