= SNR =

The initialism SNR may refer to:

- Signal-to-noise ratio
  - Signal-to-noise ratio (imaging)
- Supernova remnant
- Society for Nautical Research
- Senior, a male generational title suffix
- Sanderstead railway station, London, National Rail station code
- Stabbursnes Nature Reserve, a protected area located in Porsanger
