= SPCO =

SPCO is an abbreviation with multiple meanings, including:

- carboxyhemoglobin saturation
- Saint Paul Chamber Orchestra
- Single pole, change over, a type of electrical switch
