= SWG =

SWG may refer to:

- IBM Software Group, an internal division of IBM
- Scientific Working Group, an organisational structure for US forensic scientists
- Screen Writers Guild, a former writers union
- Secure Web Gateway, a product providing threat protection and content filtering for internet access
- Sleeping With Ghosts, a 2003 album by UK band Placebo
- Society of Woman Geographers, a professional association for researchers, scientists, explorers, and others in geographic-related fields.
- Standard wire gauge, a measurement for wires and sheet material
- Star Wars Galaxies, a 2003 computer game by LucasArts
- Strain Wave Gearing, a type of mechanical gear system that uses a flexible spline with external teeth, to form a compact, high gear ratio mechanism.
- Swabian German (ISO 639-3 language code)
- SWG, a chlorine generator used in salt water chlorination, a way of sanitizing swimming pools by separating the chlorine ions (Cl-) from salt (NaCl)
- ICAO code for Sunwing Airlines
- Special Warfare Group (Singapore), Singapore police
