= SNU =

SNU or variant, may refer to:

== Universities ==
- Seoul National University, South Korea
- Shaanxi Normal University, China
- Shenyang Normal University, China
- Shiv Nadar University, Greater Noida, India
- Somali National University, Mogadishu, Somalia
- Southern Nazarene University, Bethany, Oklahoma, USA
- Sunchon National University, South Korea

== Other uses ==
- IATA airport code SNU: Abel Santamaría Airport, Santa Clara, Cuba
- Snunit Aviation (ICAO airline code SNU); see List of airline codes (S)
- Solar neutrino unit in astronomy
- Spiritualists' National Union, UK
- Skilled nursing unit, a type of resident care
- Service national universel (general national service) of France
- Sigma Nu (abbreviated: "Snu" and "SNu" and "SigNu"), a college fraternity, US and Canada
- Viid language (ISO 639 language code snu)

== See also ==
- snu-snu
- SNUS
- Snus
