= SDO =

SDO may stand for:

== Astronomy ==
- Scattered disc object in the Solar System
- Solar Dynamics Observatory, a NASA mission to study the Sun
- Subdwarf O star (sdO)

== Computing, software, electronics ==
- Service Data Object protocol under the CANopen protocol
- Service Data Objects, allowing uniform data access
- Intel Secure Device Onboard for IoT
- Spatial Data Option, late Oracle Spatial and Graph
- Silent Death Online (videogame), from Mythic Entertainment

== Groups, companies, organizations ==
- Standards developing organization
- San Diego Opera, California, USA
- Secret Double Octopus, Israeli software company
- SDO Bussum, Bussum, Netherlands; a Dutch association football club
- Air Santo Domingo (ICAO airline code SDO)

== Other uses ==
- Sub Divisional Officer, in a district in India.
- Selective door operation on trains
- Social dominance orientation, a personality trait
- Bukar–Sadong language (ISO 639 language code sdo)
- Sistema Direzionale Orientale (Eastern Directional District), Rome, Italy; cancelled district served by Quintiliani station
