= SIIT =

S.I.I.T. or SIIT is an abbreviation for:

== IT-related ==
- Stateless IP/ICMP Translation, a means for interworking different versions of the Internet Protocol
- Standardization and Innovation in Information Technology (an academic conference by IEEE)

== Colleges and Universities ==
- Sajjad Institute of Information Technology (India)
- Saskatchewan Indian Institute of Technologies (Canada)
- School of Industrial and Information Technology (Mindanao, Philippines)
- Scholars International Institute of Technology (Delaware, USA)
- Shandong International Institution of Translation (China)
- Sirindhorn International Institute of Technology, Thammasat University (Thailand)
- South Institute of Information Technology (Pakistan)
- Suzhou Institute of Industrial Technology (China)
- Systematic Institute of Information Technology (Malaysia)

== Others ==
- Significant Incident Investigation Team (Los Angeles Fire Department)
