= STDM =

STDM may refer to:

- Statistical time-division multiplexing
- Sociedade de Turismo e Diversões de Macau
