= SMV =

SMV or smv may refer to:

== People ==
- Sir Mokshagundam Visvesvaraya, Indian engineer, politician and Diwan of Mysore

== Computer science ==
- Symbolic model verification
- SMV modelling language, used in model checking by the CMU SMV and NuSMV model checkers

== Places ==
- Samedan Airport (Switzerland), IATA airport code SMV
- Santa Maria Valley, an American Viticultural Area in California
- TusPark (Shanghai), or "Shanghai Multimedia Valley" (SMV), or "Tsinghua University Science Park"

== Medicine ==
- Superior mesenteric vein

== Other uses ==
- Sexual market value, social value from sexual attractiveness
- Boeing X-40 Space Maneuver Vehicle
- Santa Maria Valley Railroad
- Selectable Mode Vocoder
- Slow moving vehicle, a sign used in the United States to warn of vehicles normally operating in traffic at speeds of 25 mph (40 km/h) or less
- SMV (band), a bass supergroup
- smokeview, companion software to the Fire Dynamics Simulator
- Standard Minute Value, a measure of labor costs in industrial engineering predetermined motion time systems
- Star of Military Valour
- Sake Meter Value, the English term for Nihonshu-do (日本酒度), a value that indicates the sugar content of a sake based on its relative density
- Sony Music Video, the home video arm of Sony Music Entertainment
- Samvedi language, an ISO 639-3 code
