= SDH =

SDH may refer to:

== Biology and medicine ==
- Serine dehydratase
- Sorbitol dehydrogenase
- L-sorbose 1-dehydrogenase
- Subdural haematoma
- Succinate dehydrogenase

== Organizations and places ==
- St David's Hall
- Social Democrats of Croatia
- Society for Digital Humanities
- Sydney Dental Hospital

== Transportation ==
- Sudbury Hill Harrow railway station, England, National Rail station code

== Other ==
- Shubnikov–de Haas effect
- Social Determinants of Health
- Southern Kurdish, by ISO 639-3 code
- Subtitles for the deaf and hard-of-hearing, a type of closed captioning
- Synchronous digital hierarchy, in telecommunications
