= SLA =

SLA may refer to:

== Geography ==
- Martín Miguel de Güemes International Airport, Salta, Argentina, IATA code

== Science and engineering ==
- Sealed lead-acid battery
- Second-language acquisition
- Short long arms suspension, in vehicles
- Soluble liver antigen or O-phosphoseryl-tRNA(Sec) selenium transferase, an enzyme
- Spacecraft Lunar Module Adapter, part of Apollo/Saturn S-IVB
- Specific leaf area, ratio of leaf area to dry mass on a plant
- Stereo lithographic apparatus, a 3D printing technology

== Organizations ==
- Science Leadership Academy, Philadelphia, Pennsylvania, US
- School Library Association
- Sindhi Language Authority, Pakistan
- Singapore Land Authority
- Special Libraries Association, for librarians
- State Liquor Authority, New York, US

=== Armies ===
- Sindhudesh Liberation Army, a separatist organisation in Pakistan
- South Lebanon Army, Lebanese Civil War militia
- Sri Lanka Army
- Sudan Liberation Movement/Army, a rebel group in Darfur
- Symbionese Liberation Army, 1970s US radical group

== Other ==
- Service-level agreement
- SLA Industries, a role-playing game
- File format used by Scribus software
- Softwood Lumber Agreement between US and Canada
