= SQ =

SQ, Sq, or sq may stand for:

== Arts and entertainment ==
- Shakespeare Quarterly, a literary journal since 1950
- Space Quest, an adventure video game series, 1986–1995
- A fictional society in the Infinity Ring, a 2011–2015 book series
- SQ, a 1978 short story by Ursula K. Le Guin

== Businesses and organizations ==
- Singapore Airlines (IATA:SQ)
- Block, Inc., a financial services company (NYSE:SQ)
- Sûreté du Québec, a Canadian police force

== Psychology ==
- Social intelligence quotient, a statistical abstraction of social intelligence
- Systemizing quotient, a measure of a person's neurological tendency to systemize

== Science and technology ==
- SQ (program), a program for compressing files on MS-DOS and CP/M
- Sound quality, the characteristics of the output of a preamp, amp or sound system
- Stereo quadraphonic, a matrix quadraphonic gramophone record format developed by CBS
- Subcutaneous injection, in medicine

== Other uses ==
- sq. ('square'), in a unit of area
- Albanian language (ISO 639-1:sq)
