= SLV =

SLV may refer to:

- IATA code for Shimla Airport, India
- ISO 3166 code for El Salvador
- ISO 639-2 code for Slovene language
- National Rail station code for Silver Street railway station, London, England
- Satellite Launch Vehicle, an Indian space launcher
- Civil Aviation Administration Denmark (Statens Luftfartsvæsen)
- NYSE symbol for iShares Silver Trust; see Commodity market
- State Library Victoria, the central library of Victoria
- Sinnoh League Victors, the thirteenth season of the Pokémon animated series.
