= SWA =

SWA may refer to:

== Arts and media ==
- SWA (band), an American punk rock group
- SWA (magazine), an Indonesian business periodical

== Businesses and organisations ==
- Scotch Whisky Association, Scotland
- Society of Women Artists, UK
- Southwest Airlines, US (ICAO code and common short-hand name)
- Southwestern Advantage, US
- Stardom World Association, Japan
- Swatantra Party, India

== Language ==
- Swahili language, of East Africa (ISO 639 code)

== Places ==
- South West Africa, now Namibia
- Eswatini (UNDP code)
- Shantou Waisha Airport, China (IATA code prior to 2012)
- Jieyang Chaoshan International Airport, China (IATA code from 2012)
- Swansea railway station, Wales (CRS code)

== Technology ==
- SOAP with Attachments, file transfer for web services
- Steel Wire Armoured (SWA) Cable

== Other ==
- SWA, IOC code for artistic swimming at the Summer Olympics
- Slow wave activity, which is related to slow wave sleep
