= SEN =

SEN may refer to:

== Technology ==
- Small extension node
- Software Engineering Notes, a publication by the Association for Computing Machinery
- Sony Entertainment Network, a digital media delivery service

== Other uses ==
- Seddon railway station, Melbourne
- Senegal (the ISO 3166-1 alpha-3 country code)
- Sentinels, an American esports organization
- Sports Entertainment Network, radio network in Australia
  - 1116 SEN, a sports radio station in Melbourne, Australia owned by Sports Entertainment Network
- London Southend Airport (IATA airport code)
- Special educational needs, particularly in the United Kingdom
- State Enrolled Nurse
- SE-N, ISO 3166 code for Halland County in Sweden.

== See also ==
- Sen (disambiguation), for forms of the word which are not acronyms
