= SMDR =

SMDR may refer to:

- Simple Metadata Registry, a way of describing metadata
- Station Messaging Detail Record, a way to record telecommunications system activity, also known as Call detail record or CDR
- Prince Rogers Nelson song title, SMDR is an abbreviation for "Sex, Music, Drugs, Romance".
