= SWAC =

SWAC may refer to:

- Scenic West Athletic Conference, an NJCAA conference comprising colleges in the western United States
- Southwestern Athletic Conference, an NCAA athletics conference comprising historically black universities
- Standards Western Automatic Computer
- Staunton, Waynesboro and Augusta County, Virginia
- Seawater air conditioning
- Sonny with a Chance, an American sitcom
- Sex Work Autonomous Committee a sex workers union
