= South Asian Gate =

Buildings and structures in Kunming

Coordinates: 25°2′14″N 102°43′20″E

South Asian Gate (南亚之门) is a planned skyscraper in the city of Kunming, China. It will be situated in the Tuodong Lu Central Business District. The project was first announced in 2008 as the tallest building in the Yunnan province at 72 storeys, with a height of 316m. However, the final design had the height reduced to 268m.

South Asian Gate was originally scheduled to be completed in 2012 or 2013. But construction on the main tower never got off the ground, even though it progressed on other components. As of 2017, construction is stalled.

The project went through several re-designs. The first design had 288 metres and 72 storeys. The Department of Construction did not approve it, because Yunnan is a seismically active region and the design would not be safe in a strong earthquake. It was revised to 316m, 81 storeys. Again it was turned down. It was approved the third time at 333m and 83 storeys. The approved design has two separate towers, equal in height. The space between the towers looks like a Yunnan-style pagoda. The two towers were later replaced with one tower at the same height. The design of the tower was again changed and the height reduced to finally become 268m.

The South Asian Gate will be home to a five-star hotel, serviced apartments, grade-A office space, residential apartments, a commercial area, and leisure and entertainment facilities. It will occupy 34,500 square metres with a total construction area of 550,000 square metres.

The project is a joint venture between Jiangsu World Group (江苏天地集团) and Yunnan Zhongju Group (云南中炬集团).

== See also ==
- List of tallest buildings and structures in the People's Republic of China
