= SBW =

SBW may refer to:

== Transport ==
- A series of aircraft manufactured by Canadian Car and Foundry
- IATA designation for Sibu Airport
- ICAO designation for Snowbird Airlines
- MRT station abbreviation for Sembawang MRT station, Singapore

== Other uses ==
- SBW (software), a distributed workbench for systems biology modeling
- Seaborn, Broughton, & Walford Foundation, an Australian philanthropic organisation funding the performing arts
- Shinshu Brave Warriors, a Japanese basketball team
- Sonny Bill Williams (born 1985), New Zealand heavyweight boxer and former rugby league and rugby union international
