= SND =

SND, or snd, may refer to:

- Scottish National Dictionary
- Serbian National Defense Council, a Serbian diaspora activist organization
- Sinus node dysfunction
- Slovak National Theatre (Slovenské národné divadlo)
- SND Arena, an indoor multi-use venue in Asunción, Paraguay
- SND (band), a Sheffield-based electronic music duo
- SND Experiment (particle physics)
- SND Films, film distributor
- snd, the ISO 639-2 and ISO 639-3 codes for the Sindhi language
- SND, the National Rail code for Sandhurst railway station in the county of Berkshire, UK
- SND, the post-nominal letters of a Sister of Notre Dame de Namur
- SND, the post-nominal letters of a Sister of Notre Dame of Coesfeld
- Society for News Design
- Roman Dmowski's National Party (Polish: Stronnictwo Narodowe im. Dmowskiego Romana
- Various digital sound file formats using the .snd extension
- Search and Destroy as a gamemode predominantly in first-person shooter titles; the formatting used is often "SnD".

== See also ==
- Spaced en dash
