= SKM =

SKM may refer to:

- Sikkim, a state of northeastern India (postal code)
  - Kingdom of Sikkim, a former monarchy in South Asia (ISO 3166-1 alpha-3 code: SKM, now deprecated), an Indian protectorate merged with it as a state in 1975
  - Sikkim Krantikari Morcha, political party in Sikkim, India
- League of Communists of Macedonia
- Sadie Kneller Miller, 1900s journalist with gender-hiding byline SKM
- Shek Kip Mei station, Hong Kong; MTR station code
- Singapore Kindness Movement
- Sinclair Knight Merz, Australia
- Szybka Kolej Miejska (Tricity), transport service, Poland
- Rapid Urban Railway (Warsaw), transport service, Poland
- SK Telecom, NYSE symbol
- Stoke Mandeville railway station, Buckinghamshire, England; National Rail station code
- She Kills Monsters, 2011 play by Qui Nguyen
