= Sexy Boy =

Sexy Boy may refer to:

- "Sexy Boy" (Air song), a song by the French band Air
- "Sexy Boy (Soyokaze ni Yorisotte)", a song by the Japanese girl idol group Morning Musume
- "Sexy Boy", entrance music of professional wrestler Shawn Michaels
