= SJA =

SJA may refer to:

- St John Ambulance, several organisations
- St. Joseph Academy (St. Augustine, Florida), USA
- The Sarah Jane Adventures, UK TV series
- Sports Journalists' Association, UK
- St. Joan of Arc Catholic High School, Maple, Ontario, Canada
- St. Joan of Arc Secondary School, Hong Kong
- St. Johnsbury Academy, Vermont, US
- Saint Joseph Academy (disambiguation)
- Staff judge advocate, role in the US Army
