= SLO =

SLO, or Slo, may refer to:

== Places ==
- San Luis Obispo, a city in the state of California, US
- San Luis Obispo County, a county in the state of California, US
- San Luis Obispo Coast / SLO Coast viticultural area in San Luis Obispo County, California, US
- Slovakia, UNDP country code
- Slovenia, IOC country code and vehicle registration code

== Medicine ==
- Scanning laser ophthalmoscopy, an eye examination method
- Secondary lymphoid organ, for example a lymph node or spleen
- Streptolysin O, exotoxin produced by streptococci

== Transport ==
- Salem–Leckrone Airport (IATA code), Illinois, US
- San Luis Obispo station, (Amtrak Station Code) Amtrak Station, in California
- Slough railway station (National Rail code), in the county of Berkshire, UK
- SLO Transit, a provider of mass transportation in San Luis Obispo, California, US
- Solo Balapan railway station, a railway station in Central Java, Indonesia (national station code)
- Samalkot Junction railway station (station code), Andhra Pradesh, India

== Other uses ==
- Service-level objective, of a customer agreement
- SLO, a music album by Jess Mills
- Student Learning Objectives, an assessment tool used by teachers
- Supporter liaison officer, of a sports club
