= SKK =

SKK can refer to:

- Slovak koruna, former Slovak currency
- Shaktoolik Airport
- Shaolin Kempo Karate, a martial art
- SKK Kotwica Kołobrzeg, Polish basketball team
- SKK Lighting company by Shiu-Kay Kan
- Sotakorkeakoulu, the Finnish war college (1924-1992)
