= SPDT =

SPDT may refer to:

- Single pole, double throw, a simple type of changeover electrical switch
- Single Point Diamond Turning, a type of mechanical machining using diamond-tipped cutting elements
- SCSI Pass-Through Direct, (SPTD) is a proprietary device driver and application programming interface (API)
