= SVM =

SVM may refer to:

== Politics ==
- Alliance of Vojvodina Hungarians (Savez vojvođanskih Mađara), a political party in Serbia
- Frederiksen II Cabinet, colloquially called "SVM", current Danish government since 2022.

== Technology ==
- Scanning voltage microscopy
- Secure Virtual Machine, a virtualization technology by AMD
- Shared Virtual Memory, another AMD technology for computation on its GPUs with HSA/ROCm.
- Solaris Volume Manager, software
- Space vector modulation, in power electronics, a modulating technique to give power to a load
- Support vector machine, a machine learning algorithm
- Stroboscopic effect visibility measure (SVM), a measure for assessing a type of temporal light artefacts

== Other ==
- SVM (company)
- Saskatchewan Volunteer Medal
- Schuylkill Valley Metro
- Slavomolisano (ISO 639-3 svm), a dialect of Serbo-Croatian spoken in Italy
