= SMH =

SMH may refer to:

== Education ==
- Saint Mary's Hall (San Antonio), a school in Texas, US
- Stonyhurst Saint Mary's Hall, a school in Lancashire, England

== Hospitals ==
- Sarasota Memorial Hospital, Florida, US
- Strong Memorial Hospital, Rochester, New York, US
- Surrey Memorial Hospital, British Columbia, Canada

== Media ==
- The Sydney Morning Herald, an Australian newspaper

== Other ==
- Samei language of Yunnan, China, ISO 639 code
- "Smacking my head" or "Shaking my head" in SMS language
- Stamford Hill railway station in London, England, National Rail station code

== See also ==
- SMHS (disambiguation)
