= SVC =

SVC or .svc may refer to:

== Biology ==
- Spring viraemia of carp, a disease of fish
- Superior vena cava, a heart vein

== Colleges ==
- Saginaw Valley College, now Saginaw Valley State University, Michigan, US
- School of Visual Concepts, Seattle, Washington, US
- Southern Vermont College, near Bennington, US
- Saint Vincent's College, in Dipolog City, Philippines

== Finance ==
- Salvadoran colón, ISO 4217 currency code
- Stored-value card, a type of payment card

== Organizations ==
- Shanghai Volunteer Corps (1853−1942), of the Shanghai International Settlement
- Skills and Volunteering Cymru, a charity in Cardiff, Wales
- Sun Valley Center for the Arts and Humanities, Sun Valley, Idaho, US

== Technology ==
- Saab Variable Compression engine
- Static VAR compensator, electrical power factor compensator

=== Computing ===
- IBM SAN Volume Controller
- Supervisor Call instruction, a mainframe computer instruction
- Support-vector clustering, similar to support vector machine
- .svc, Microsoft IIS file extension
- Switched virtual circuit

== Other uses ==
- Smith–Volterra–Cantor set in mathematics
- Supercoppa (Vatican City), football tournament in Vatican City
- SVC, the FAA identifier for Grant County Airport in Silver City, New Mexico, US
- Sri Venkateswara Creations, Indian film production and distribution company
