= Svir (disambiguation) =

Svir can refer to:

- Svir, a river in Leningrad Oblast, Russia
- Svir, Belarus, a town in Myadzyel District
- Lake Svir, a lake in Myadzyel District, Belarus
- 9M119 Svir, an anti tank missile
