= Spod =

Spod may refer to:

- SPOD (band) a band from Sydney, Australia
- A spod, an avid user of Internet talkers, a type of online chat system.
- SPOD, Sea Port of Debarkation
- Spinning Pizza of Death, a colloquial name for a cursor on macOS
