= SZL =

SZL may refer to:

- The Silesian language (ISO 639-3 code)
- Swazi lilangeni (ISO 4217 currency code)
- Swaziland Airlink (ICAO airline code)
- Whiteman Air Force Base (IATA airport code)
