= SNE =

SNE may refer to:

- Group SNE, a Japanese company
- Jagoi language (ISO 639-3: sne), a language of Borneo
- Sony Corporation (formerly NYSE: SNE, now SONY)
- Southern New England Railway
- Synthetic natural environment
- News24 World
- Supernovae (abbreviated SNe)
