= SRTP =

SRTP may refer to:

- Secure Real-time Transport Protocol, security profile for Real-time Transport Protocol
- Service Request Transport Protocol, GE-Fanuc automation protocol for programmable logic controller
- Safe Return to Port requirement, SOLAS requirement to be able to return to port without ship evacuation

== See also ==
- ZRTP, a cryptographic key-agreement protocol using Secure Real-time Transport Protocol for encryption
