= SJC =

SJC may stand for:

- IATA airport code for Norman Y. Mineta San Jose International Airport, San Jose, California, United States
- San Jose, California, in Santa Clara County
- San Juan Capistrano, a city in Orange County, California, United States
  - San Juan Creek, a creek flowing through the city
- São José dos Campos, a city in São Paulo, Brazil
- Senate Judiciary Committee, a standing committee of the United States Senate
- SJC, postnominal for a member of Canons Regular of Saint John Cantius
- Social Justice Coalition (South Africa) community based NGO in South Africa
- Stephen J. Cannell, American television producer
- Stuart James Campbell, British prisoner
- Stuart John Crichton, British music producer

== Colleges ==
- St. John's College, University of British Columbia, a residential college in the University of British Columbia, Vancouver
- St. John's College, University of Hong Kong, a student residential hall in the University of Hong Kong
- St John's College, University of Queensland, a student residential college in the University of Queensland, Australia
- St. John's College (Brantford), a Roman Catholic high school in Brantford, Ontario, Canada
- St John's College, Oxford, a constituent college of the University of Oxford
- St John's College, Cambridge, a constituent college of the University of Cambridge
- St. John's College (Annapolis/Santa Fe), a private liberal arts college with two U.S. campuses, one in Annapolis, Maryland, and one in Santa Fe, New Mexico.
- St. John's College High School, a high school in Washington, D.C.
- St. John's College, Hamilton, a high school in Hamilton, New Zealand
- St. Joseph's College, Curepipe, a secondary school in Curepipe, Mauritius
- St. Joseph Higher Secondary School, an American Catholic missionary institution in Bangladesh
- St. Joseph's College, Allahabad, a school in Uttar Pradesh, India
- St Joseph's College, Geelong, a Roman Catholic school in Geelong, Australia
- St Joseph's College, Hong Kong, a secondary school in Hong Kong
- St. Joseph's College, Hunters Hill, a Roman Catholic Marist school in Sydney, Australia
- St. John's College (Harare), an independent school in Harare, Zimbabwe.

== Courts ==
- Maine Supreme Judicial Court, the highest court in the United States state of Maine
- Massachusetts Supreme Judicial Court, the highest court in the United States state of Massachusetts

== Other ==
- SJC (cable system), pan-Asia submarine communications cable system
