= SOF =

SOF may refer to:

- Science Olympiad Foundation, based in New Delhi, India
- Sea of Faith, a Christian liberal philosophical movement
- Sea of Faith (TV series), by the BBC
- Semaine Olympique Française, annual sailing regatta in Hyères
- Vasil Levski Sofia Airport, Bulgaria (IATA airport code)
- Soldier of Fortune (disambiguation)
- Sound-on-film, technology that stores a movie's soundtrack on the film
- Special operations forces, military and police units
  - Special Operations Forces (Russia)
  - Special Operations Force (Singapore)
  - Special Operations Forces (Ukraine)
- Start of frame delimiter, in computer networks data transmission
- Statement of Facts, a report of a ship's stay in port
- Stretton-on-Fosse, a village in Great Britain
- Student of Fortune, an online tutoring company
- Superior orbital fissure, a foramen in the skull
