= SFF =

SFF may refer to:

== Arts ==
- subito fortissimo (sff), a dynamic marking in music
- Science fiction and fantasy, a broad genre also known as speculative fiction

=== Festivals ===
- Sarajevo Film Festival, in Bosnia and Herzegovina
- Saraqusta Film Festival, in Spain
- Sydney Film Festival, in Australia

=== Television ===
- Peepoodo & the Super Fuck Friends, an adult animated series

== Businesses and organizations ==
- Science Festival Foundation, organizers of the 2008 World Science Festival
- Shooters, Fishers and Farmers Party, an Australian political party
- Small Form Factor Committee, an electronics industry group
- Space Frontier Foundation, an American space advocacy non-profit organization
- Spiritual Frontiers Fellowship, an American not-for-profit volunteer organization
- Stone Family Foundation, a British charitable organization

=== Military ===
- Special Field Force, a Namibian paramilitary police unit
- Special Frontier Force, an Indian paramilitary special force

=== Sports ===
- Seychelles Football Federation
- Somali Football Federation

== Science and technology ==
- Small form factor PC, a desktop computer with minimal volume and footprint
- Standard flowgram format, a binary file format to encode results of pyrosequencing

== Other uses ==
- Felts Field (IATA airport code: SFF), an airport near Spokane, Washington, US
