= SISO =

SISO may refer to:

== Technology ==
- Single-input single-output system, in control engineering
- Soft-in soft-out decoder, a type of soft-decision decoder

== Organisations ==
- Simulation Interoperability Standards Organization, in modeling and simulation
- Samsung India Software Operations, the former name of Samsung R&D Institute India - Bangalore
