= SEK =

SEK or Sek may refer to:

== Organisations ==
- Federation of Swiss Protestant Churches (German: Schweizerischer Evangelischer Kirchenbund)
- SEK Studio, a North Korean animation studio
- Stagecoach in East Kent, a transportation company in England
- SEK (Germany) (German: Spezialeinsatzkommando), police tactical units of the German state police forces
- Hellenic State Railways (Greek: Σιδηρόδρομοι Ελληνικού Κράτους, romanized: Sidirodromoi Ellinikou Kratous), a former Greek public sector entity
- Socialist Workers Party (Greece) (Greek: Σοσιαλιστικό Εργατικό Κόμμα, romanized: Sosialistikó Ergatikó Kómma), a political party in Greece
- Swedish Export Credit Corporation (Swedish: Svensk Exportkredit)

== People ==
- Sęk, a Polish surname
- Sek Henry (born 1987), American-Jamaican basketball player
- Seksan Sukpimai (born 1974), known as Sek Loso, Thai singer, songwriter and musician
- Samuel Edward Konkin III (1947–2004), known as SEK III, Canadian-American writer

== Other uses ==
- Swedish krona (ISO 4217 currency code), the currency of Sweden
- Sehk or Sek, a village in South Khorasan Province, Iran
- Sewer Evil King, a fictional character in Okage: Shadow King
