= SPIE (disambiguation) =

SPIE is the Society of Photo-Optical Instrumentation Engineers, an international optical engineering society.

SPIE may also refer to:

- Special Patrol Insertion/Extraction, a military technique for insertion/extraction
- Spie Batignolles, France-based multinational engineering company
- SPIE Gold Medal, the highest honor of the International Society for Optics and Photonics
- SPIE Newsroom, a technical news website launched in March 2006
