= SSDD =

SSDD, an initialism, may refer to:

- Single Sided, Double Density, a floppy disk format
- Serious Sam Double D, a 2011 video game by Mommy's Best Games and Devolver Digital
- Source Selection Decision Document in government procurement in the United States
- "System/Subsystem Design Description" / "System Segment Design Description" / "System Segment Design Document", part of the MIL-STD-498 military standard
