= SBP =

SBP may refer to:

== Science, medicine and technology ==
- Sanford Burnham Prebys Medical Discovery Institute, California
- Scannerless Boolean Parser, a software development tool
- Serial Bus Protocol 2, a computer interconnect specification
- Spontaneous bacterial peritonitis
- SBP-tag (Streptavidin-Binding Peptide-tag), an amino acid sequence
- Solitary bone plasmacytoma, a type of cancer
- Sex steroid-binding protein
- Systolic blood pressure, maximum blood pressure during one heartbeat

== Schools ==
- Sekolah Berasrama Penuh, a school system in Malaysia
- Student body president

== Organizations ==
- Samahang Basketbol ng Pilipinas, the national basketball federation of the Philippines
- SBP (nonprofit organization) (formerly the St. Bernard Project), a disaster relief organization
- Serbisyo sa Bayan Party, a Philippine political party
- Society of Business Practitioners, a British professional institute
- State Bank of Pakistan, Central bank of Pakistan
- State Bank of Puntland, Central bank in Puntland
- Swatantra Bharat Party, an Indian political party
- The Sunday Business Post, an Irish financial newspaper

== Transport ==
- IATA airport code for San Luis Obispo County Regional Airport in California, US
- National Rail station code for Stonebridge Park station in London, England

== Other uses ==
- SIL International code for Sangu, a language of Tanzania
- Soft Border Patrol, a Northern Irish mockumentary sitcom
- "Sweet but Psycho", a 2018 song by Ava Max
