= SEG =

SEG or seg may refer to:

== Organisations ==
- Society of Economic Geologists
- Society of Exploration Geophysicists
- Semaphore Entertainment Group, co-founder of the Ultimate Fighting Championship
- Southern Examining Group, a former English examining body
- Special Escort Group (Metropolitan Police), England
- Special Escort Group (Ministry of Defence Police) (SEG (MDP)), UK
- The ASX code for Sports Entertainment Group, an Australian media company

== Transport ==
- Penn Valley Airport IATA code
- Selling railway station, Kent, England (National Rail station code SEG)
- Shegaon railway station, Maharashtra, India (Indian Railways station code: SEG)

== Other uses ==
- Smart Export Guarantee, a scheme which rewards export of electricity by small-scale low-carbon generators in the United Kingdom
- Supplementum Epigraphicum Graecum, new studies of ancient Greek inscriptions
- Ség., taxonomic author abbreviation of Jean-François Séguier (1703–1784), French botanist

== See also ==
- Segment (disambiguation)
