= SMO =

SMO or Smo may refer to:

== Biology ==
- Smoothened, a gene that encodes a protein of the same name
- Spermine oxidase, an enzyme
- Styrene monooxygenase, an enzyme

== Computing and technology ==
- Sequential minimal optimization, an algorithm for training support vector machines
- Social media optimization
- Solar Monitoring Observatory, on the International Space Station
- SQL Server Management Objects for Microsoft SQL Server

== Organizations ==
- Sabhal Mòr Ostaig, a Scottish Gaelic-medium public college on the Isle of Skye
- Slovak Youth Orchestra

== Transport ==
- SMO, IATA airport code for Santa Monica Airport, USA
- SMO, National Rail station code for South Merton railway station, London

== Other uses ==
- SMO, ITU country code for Samoa
- smo, ISO 639-3 code for the Samoan language
- Smo, former stage name of Sara Forsberg (born 1994), Finnish singer
- SMO, a character first appeared in the episode "Be More" of the animated series Adventure Time
- Senior Medical Officer, a rank in the British Royal Army Medical Corps
- Singapore Mathematical Olympiad, a mathematics competition
- Site management organization, a provider of services to an organization holding a clinical trial
- Social movement organization, a formal organization within a social movement
- Special military operation, the Russian government's name for the 2022 Invasion of Ukraine
- Super Mario Odyssey, a video game released for the Nintendo Switch
- Big Smo, stage name of American country rap musician John Smith (born 1976)
