= SBD =

SBD may refer to:

- Douglas SBD Dauntless, a World War II American naval scout plane and dive bomber
- San Bernardino International Airport, airport identifier code SBD
- Savings Bank of Danbury, a bank headquartered in Connecticut
- Schottky barrier diode
- Seaboard System Railroad, reporting mark SBD
- Secure by design, in software engineering, the principle of designing a program from the ground up to be secure
- Sell By Date, see Shelf life
- Sentence boundary disambiguation a natural language processing problem
- Short Burst Data, a communication protocol for the Iridium-Modem
- Silent but deadly, a term to describe a silent but pungent fart
  - Silent but Deadly, a 2011 movie
- Slaughter Beach, Dog, an American rock band
- Smart Battery Data, a method for monitoring a rechargeable battery pack
- Solomon Islands dollar, ISO 4217 currency code
- Soundboard (disambiguation), multiple meanings
- Abbreviation for the southbound direction of travel
- Stanley Black & Decker, an American manufacturer of industrial tools and household hardware
- Super battle droid, from the Star Wars fictional universe
