= SWZ =

SWZ may refer to:

- Alat Cargo Airport (under construction), Azerbaijan, IATA airport code SWZ
- Eswatini (formerly Swaziland), a country with the three-letter country code of SWZ
