= SDN =

SDN can stand for:

- S4C Digital Networks, UK TV company
- SAP Developer Network
- Sandane Airport, Anda, Norway
- Scottish Daily News, a newspaper published in 1975
- Scottish Digital Network, proposed in 2011
- SDN List, Specially Designated Nationals and Blocked Persons List
- Sebacoyldinalbuphine
- Sexually dimorphic nucleus, a cluster of cells in the brain
- Sholavandan railway station, Madurai, Tamil Nadu, India, station code
- Société des Nations, French for League of Nations
- Software-defined networking, an approach to computer networking
- Specially Designated Nationals with whom US persons may not do business
- St Denys railway station, station code
- Student Doctor Network in North America
- Sydenham railway station, Sydney, station code
- Sudan, ISO 3166-1 alpha-3 code
