= SX =

SX, Sx, sx, or S_{x} may refer to:

== Medicine ==
- S_{x}, symptoms
- S_{x}, surgery

== Music ==
- SX (band), a Belgian indie pop band
- S-X, a British producer and singer

== Technology ==
- .sx, the country code top-level domain for Sint Maarten
- Betacam SX, a type of videotape for Betacam
- 1000BASE-SX, a fiber optic gigabit Ethernet standard
- MAN SX, a range of high mobility tactical trucks
- Parallax SX, a range of micro-controllers made by Ubicom
- NEC SX architecture of supercomputers

== Other uses ==
- SX News, a gay and lesbian newspaper in Australia
- sx salon, a digital platform providing a forum for critical and creative explorations of Caribbean literature
- Skybus Airlines (IATA airline code SX)
- AMA Supercross Championship, a form of off-road motorcycle racing
- Shanxi, a province of China (Guobiao abbreviation SX)
- Ŝ, a letter in the Esperanto alphabet
- Greece (aircraft registration prefix SX)

== See also ==
- Sx Tape, a 2013 horror film
- Regulation S-X, regarding financial statements in the United States
- SpaceX
- Sussex
