= Srđ =

Mountain in Dalmatia, Croatia

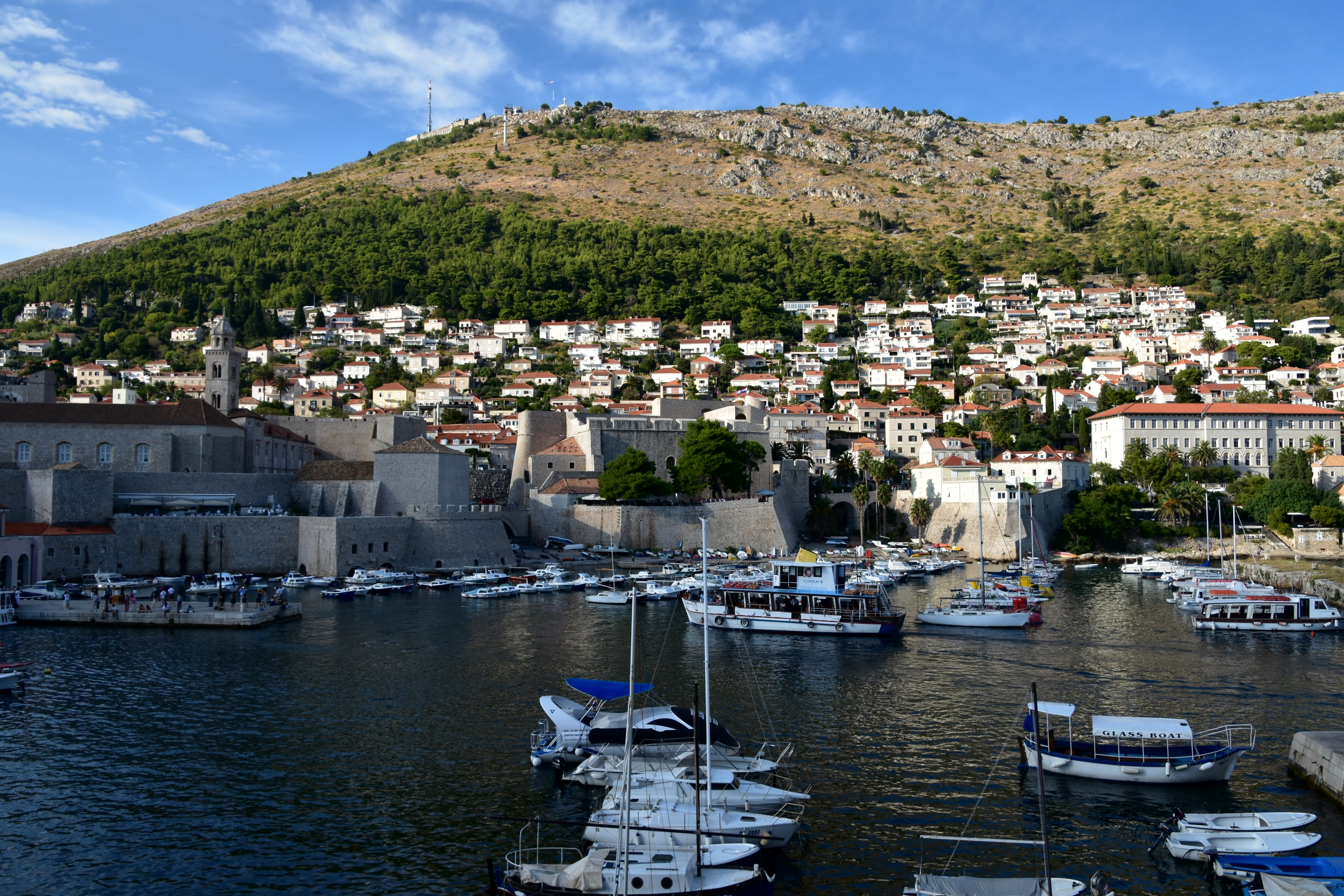
- Srđ, above Dubrovnik

Highest point
- Elevation: 412 m (1,352 ft)
- Coordinates: 42°39′N 18°07′E

Geography
- Location within Croatia
- Location: Croatia

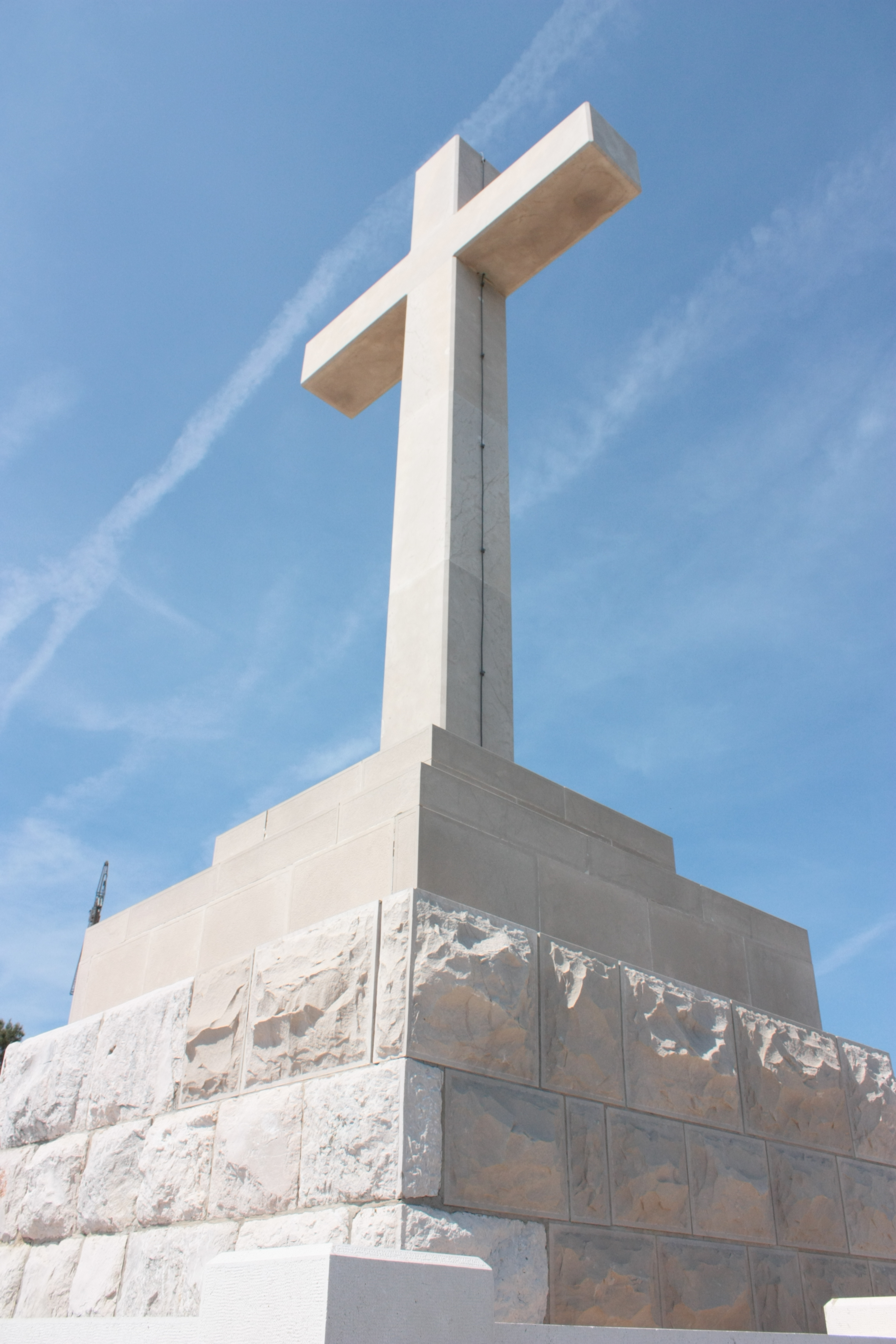
The White Cross that had been destroyed during the 1991–95 war has been rebuilt.

Srđ is a low mountain just behind the walled city of Dubrovnik in Dalmatia, Croatia. The mountain, part of the Dinaric Alps, has a height of 412 metres (1,352 ft). At its top is a large white stone cross and Fort Imperial, a defensive structure built by the French in 1810 during the Napoleonic Wars. Srđ is popular with tourists as a viewpoint from which it is possible to see the walled city of Dubrovnik, Lokrum island, the Adriatic Sea and various local attractions (including restaurants and the Stradun).

A long, steep footpath runs up from the town, initially passing through pine trees as it climbs to the top of the mountain. Fort Imperial at the top houses the Museum of the Croatian War of Independence (1991–1995). The television mast was destroyed by fighter aircraft from the Yugoslav Air Force. The cable car that was disabled during this time has since been reopened, and Srđ has been developed as a tourist attraction, with a restaurant and a base for buggy safaris.

Srđ was once forested with oak trees which locals called dubrava (from the old Slavic word dub, "oak tree"), after which the city of Dubrovnik was named. The southern slope was once rich with pine forests, but in the second half of the 20th century and during the Croatian War of Independence, the forest was almost completely gutted by numerous fires. The mountain was home to one of the fiercest battles of the Independence War, namely the Siege of Dubrovnik.
