= SKC =

SKC may refer to:

== Education ==
- Salish Kootenai College, a Native American tribal college in Pablo, Montana, U.S.
- South Kent College, a former college in southeast England
- St Kevin's College, Melbourne, Australia
- Saint Kentigern College, Auckland, New Zealand

== Sports ==
- Siófok KC, a Hungarian women's handball team
- Sporting Kansas City, a U.S. soccer club in the Kansas City metropolitan area

== Other uses ==
- Ma Manda language (ISO 639:skc), one of the Finisterre languages of Papua New Guinea
- Services Kinema Corporation, part of Services Sound and Vision Corporation
- SKC Group, a subsidiary company of SK Group
- Studentski Kulturni Centar, Belgrade
- Suki Airport (IATA: SKC), Western Province, Papua New Guinea
