= Enhanced Position Location Reporting System =

US military tactical data communication system

The Enhanced Position Location Reporting System (EPLRS) is a secure, jam-resistant, computer-controlled communications network that distributes near real-time tactical information, generally integrated into radio sets, and coordinated by a Network Control Station. It is primarily used for data distribution, position location, and reporting. It enhances command and control of tactical units by providing commanders with the location of friendly units. It was first fielded by the US Army in 1987.

EPLRS is a Time Division Multiple Access System that uses a frequency hopping, spread spectrum waveform in the UHF band. It incorporates the Thornton family of COMSEC devices, and has the capability for Over the Air Rekeying (OTAR). EPLRS uses the Army Data Distribution System version of the X.25 CCITT and IEEE 802.3 protocols to interface with Army Tactical Command and Control System (ATCCS).

Situation Awareness Data Link (SADL), installed on USAF F-16 and A-10 fighters, coordinates with EPLRS for ground support missions.

== Network Control Station ==
Each network is controlled by a Network Control Station (NCS), AN/TSQ-158. These have gone through several iterations.

=== First Gen ===
- 1 AN/UYK-7 computer
- 3 AN/UYK-20 computers

=== Second Gen ===
- 1 AN/UYK-7 computer
- 3 AN/UYK-44(V) computers

=== Third Gen ===
Downsized version to fit in HMMWV, first fielded in 1991. Dimensions: 8.5'x7'x6', 4000 lbs

- 1 AN/UYK-44(V) Enhanced Processor (EP) computer

=== Fourth Gen ===
The AN/TSQ-158(V)4 is produced by Raytheon. Housed in a HMMWV replacing the AN/UYK-44 computer with a Toughbook laptop computer. Data is displayed through the FBCB2 platform.

== See also ==
- Joint Electronics Type Designation System – Unclassified designation system for United States military electronic equipment
- List of military electronics of the United States
