= Choi Afock =

First Chinese visitor to Sweden

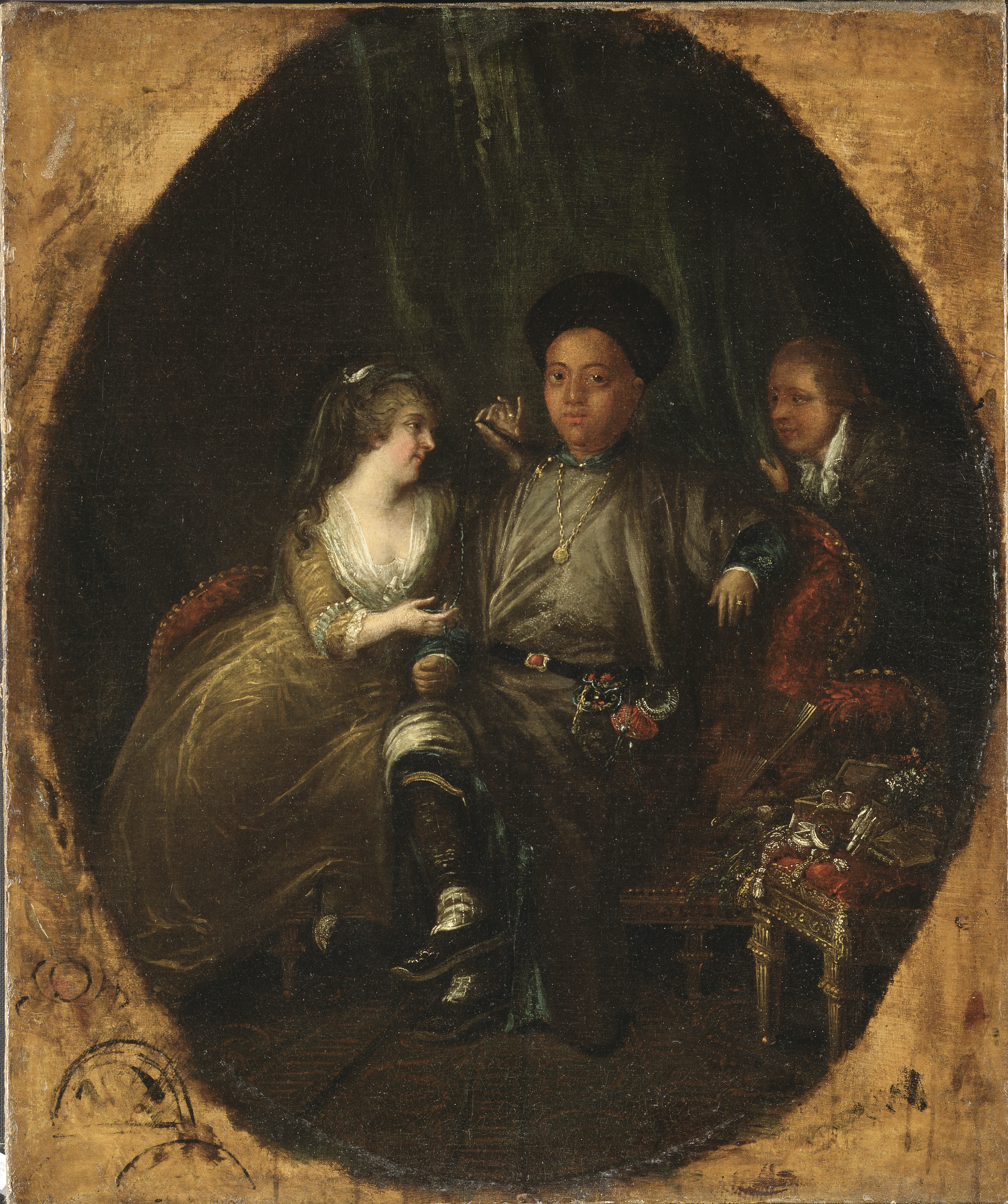
- Choi Afock painted by Swedish artist Elias Martin alongside Aurora Taube and Olof Lindahl, 1787
- Born: 1763
- Occupations: Merchant, interpreter
- Known for: Earliest recorded Chinese person to visit Sweden

Choy Chun Ng (蔡鎮伍, Jyutping: Coi3 Zan3 Ng5) also known as Choi Afock (蔡阿福, Jyutping: Coi1 A3 Fuk1) (Note: Also rendered as A-fuk.) was a merchant and interpreter, as well as the earliest recorded Chinese person to visit Sweden.

== Early life and career ==
Choy Chun Ng was born sometime in 1763, and was a merchant from Guangzhou (then known as Canton) in south-eastern China (then the Qing dynasty).

Very little is known about Afock's background and early life, aside from the facts that he was born in Canton (Guangzhou) around 1763, that his father was supposed to be “a Mandarin”, that he was married, and that he had at least one brother who was also involved in the Canton trade. In 1786, he was working at the Swedish East India Company factory in Canton (瑞行), according to some sources as an interpreter and according to others as a comprador. At the factory, Afock had become acquainted with the Swedish supercargo Olof Lindahl (1748–1801), and together with him, he undertook a voyage to Sweden in 1786–1787. He thereby became the first Chinese person ever to visit Sweden.

== Journey to Sweden ==
Afock and Lindahl arrived in Gothenburg (Göteborg) with the East Indiaman Adolph Fredric on 24 July 1786. After having spent two weeks in the city, they left for Lindahl's hometown, Norrköping, on 10 August. It is not known when they reached Norrköping, but on 19 August, they visited the country-house of a local nobleman in the vicinity of the city. Shortly thereafter, Afock and Lindahl set out on a six-week tour of Sweden, travelling through the provinces of Närke, Västmanland, Dalarna and Gästrikland. Among other places, they visited the copper mine in Falun, in late September. By early October, they were back in Norrköping again.

On 9 October, the Swedish king Gustav III visited Norrköping and then met with Afock, who caught his interest. The king asked him to come and visit him in Stockholm, and ca one month later, Afock and Lindahl set out for the Swedish capital. During his stay in Stockholm, Afock became a great sensation in polite society, being invited to tea, dinners and salons almost daily. The Swedish upper-class at the time was heavily influenced by the Sinophilia of the Enlightenment, why anything China-related was considered most interesting and fashionable. Afock and Lindahl also made a short trip to Uppsala, where they met with crown prince Gustav Adolf, who would later become king Gustav IV Adolf. Their stay in Stockholm was crowned by a visit to the royal castle on 26 November, where they met the king again, as well as other members of the royal family. The following morning, Afock was also bestowed the honour of attending the royal levee.

After their visit to Stockholm, Afock and Lindahl returned to Norrköping, and from there, Afock set out for Gothenburg around 10 December. It is not known what happened to him after this point, even if it seems likely that he returned to China on the East Indiaman Sophia Magdalena, which sailed from Gothenburg on 13 January and reached Canton on 29 July 1787.

== Fade into obscurity and rediscovery ==
Although Choy's visit and subsequent six-month stay in Sweden made him a well-known person in the country, his story would eventually fade into obscurity. He would only appear for the first time in Swedish literature in 1916, exactly 130 years after he initially arrived in the country, in the multi-volume "Svenska folkets underbara öden" (The wonderful destinies of the Swedish people) by historian Carl Grimberg, in which Grimberg writes passingly about the first instance of a Chinese person visiting the country without mentioning Choy by name.

It took more than 20 years before Choy was again mentioned in any academic literature, this time in a doctoral dissertation published in 1939 on art history, as he had been the subject of an etching by Swedish artist Johan Fredrik Martin (1755–1816). From 1939 to the early 1990s, Afock appeared sparingly in literature, being mentioned in an article published in the "Hudiksvallstidningen" (Hudiksvall Newspaper) in 1968, a biography of Count Knut Knutsson Posse (1755–1814) published in 1971, a biography of Jean-Jacques De Geer (1737–1809) in 1987, and although he was not named, a 1992 article by Chinese historian Cai Hongsheng about the Swedish East India Company's trade relations with China, where it is also claimed that Choy was a Christian:

It has been seen on a visitor’s book (autograph) in the Fan Lun (Falun) museum of iron work that a Chinese from Fujian who was a follower of their (Swedish) religion (Lutheran Church) visited this place in the 54th year of the reign of Qianlong (1789). This man should be the earliest (Chinese) visitor to Sweden.

In 1998, Choy was the subject of a study by Swedish art historian Jan Wirgin in his book "Från Kina till Europa. Kinesiska konstföremål från de ostindiska kompaniernas tid" (From China to Europe: Chinese artefacts from the East India Company era), where he provided a detailed account of Afock's journey through Sweden as well as new sources.

In 2005, Taiwanese historian Chen Kuo-tung writes about Choy in his book "東亞海域一千年" (A Thousand Years in the Seas of East Asia), comparing him with other Chinese who visited Europe around the 17th and 18th centuries. Chen also writes about the physical remnants of Choy's visit to Sweden consisting of paintings and etchings of his person as well as a porcelain plaque decorated with his name, located today in the Museum of Far Eastern Antiquities in Stockholm.

The second half of the 2010s saw an increased interest in Choy amongst Western academics. He was included in the 2015 book "This Home Is Not A Home: European Everyday Life in Canton and Macao 1730–1830" by Swedish historian Lisa Hellman, in which Hellman argues that Choy's visit to Sweden and his status as an "exotic novelty" aided in advancing the social status of his patron Olof Lindahl, a supercargo working for the Swedish East India Company, within Swedish high society.

In 2016, Choy was also the subject of a study exploring the impact of Chinese goods and his visit on Swedish gendered relations by historian Jacqueline van Gent in her article published in the Scandinavian Journal of History.

== See also ==
- Chinese people in Sweden
- China–Sweden relations
