= SSB =

SSB or ssb may refer to:

== Organizations ==
- Scandinavian School of Brussels, an international school in Belgium
- Societas Sanctae Birgittae, the Society of Saint Bridget
- Society of the Sisters of Bethany, an Anglican order of sisters
- Society of Systematic Biologists
- Städtische Strassenbahn Bern, a former public transport operator in Switzerland
- Statistics Norway (Norwegian: Statistisk sentralbyrå), a Norwegian government statistics bureau
- Stuttgarter Straßenbahnen, a public transport operator in Germany
- Sustainable South Bronx, an environmental justice organization
- Swedish School Beijing, a former international school in China (1994–2015)
- Smoke Signal Broadcasting, a defunct American computer company
- Social Security Board (disambiguation)

=== Military ===
- Presidency of Defense Industries (Turkish: Savunma Sanayii Başkanlığı) of Turkey
- SSB (militia), a paramilitary clan militia that operates in the Sool, Sanaag and Togdheer regions of Somaliland
- Sashastra Seema Bal, an Indian border patrol force, formerly called Special Service Bureau
- Secret Service Bureau, United Kingdom, now called the Secret Intelligence Service
- Services Selection Board, for the selection of candidates in officer cadre of Indian Armed Forces
- Special Service Battalion, a South African military unit
- Strategic Support Branch, a U.S. Department of Defense intelligence agency

== Science and technology ==
- Solid-state battery, a battery with solid electrodes and a solid electrolyte
- Secure Scuttlebutt, decentralized social network
- Single-sideband modulation, an electronic method of transmitting information with a carrier wave
- Single-stranded binding protein, a class of proteins
- Single-strand break, a break in only one of the two strands on DNA
- Site-specific browser, for an intranet or the Internet
- Sjögren syndrome antigen B, a human gene
- Speculative Store Bypass, a hardware security flaw affecting many processors
- Spontaneous symmetry breaking, in physics
- Stabilized soil block, a type of compressed earth block, a building material

== Other uses ==
- Sugar-sweetened beverage, a beverage sweetened with added sugar
- Ship Submersible Ballistic, a submarine
- Standard Southern British, a name for a variety of English
- Southern Sama language (ISO 639-3 code)
- Sultan sa Barongis, a municipality in Maguindanao del Sur, Philippines
