= Chinese people in Sweden =

People of Chinese descent living in or having grown up in Sweden

瑞典华人; kineser i Sverige

Total population
- 39,842 (including Taiwan and Hong Kong-born residents)

Regions with significant populations
- Stockholm

Languages
- Numerous varieties of Chinese (predominantly Mandarin and Cantonese), Swedish

Related ethnic groups
- Overseas Chinese

Chinese people in Sweden (Swedish: kineser i Sverige; Chinese: 瑞典华人; pinyin: Ruìdiǎn Huárén) include people born in the People's Republic of China, or have ancestry from there. It may also include people originating from Taiwan and Hong Kong. They form a sizable community and are one of the biggest Asian groups. As of 2021, there are 37,172 mainland Chinese immigrants in Sweden.

== History ==
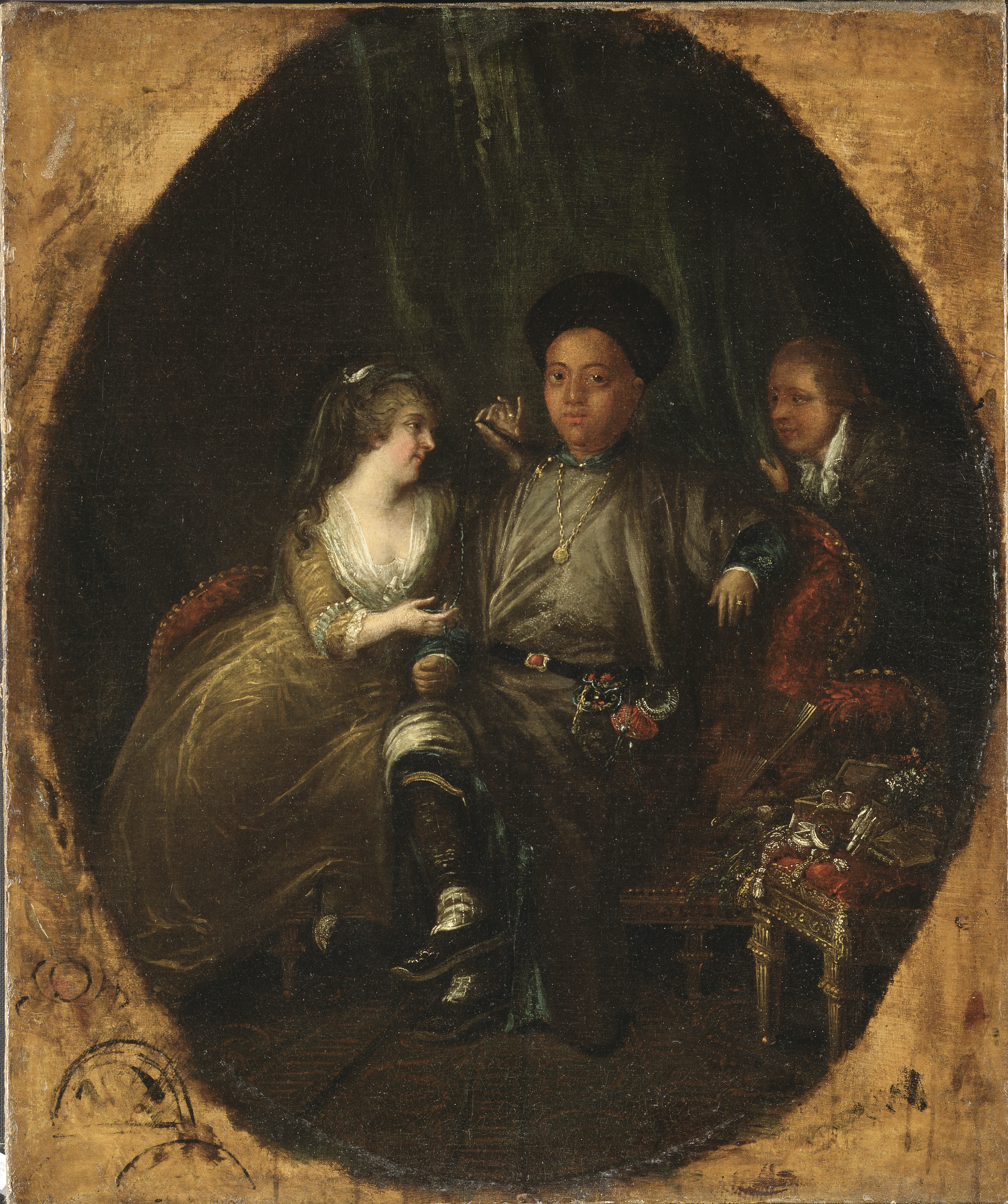
Choi Afock in the middle, the first documented arrival of a Chinese individual in Sweden

The first known documented arrival of a Chinese individual in Sweden was Choi Afock in 1786, a translator employed by the Swedish East India Company.

In the mid-1970s, Chinese people began immigrating to Sweden, where they largely made a living by running Chinese-themed restaurants.

== Demographics ==
25% of Sweden's reduced number of international university students after tuition fees were introduced for non-EU/EEA applicants come from China.

== See also ==
- China–Sweden relations
- Sweden-Taiwan relations
- Chinese people in Denmark
- Chinese people in Finland
