= Immigration to Finland =

The most common reasons for immigration to Finland are work, family reunification, study, asylum, return migration and the pursuit of a high quality of life. Immigration is linked to discussions about ethnicity, economic effects, employment, integration and political developments. It also addresses labour shortages, supports the ageing population and contributes to innovation.

Historically, Finland has been predominantly ethnically homogeneous, with native Finns forming the majority of the population. Traditional minority groups include Finland-Swedes, Sámi and Roma communities. Immigration has increased significantly over the last three decades, leading to greater ethnic diversity. Major immigrant groups in Finland include Estonians, Russians, Ukrainians, Iraqis, Chinese, Somalis, Filipinos, Indians and Iranians.

As of 2025, Statistics Finland has published data on the foreign population using three different methods. The Finnish population includes persons of foreign origin and background, who make up 11.7% of the total population. (Note: Statistics Finland classifies a person as having a "foreign background" if both parents or the only known parent were born abroad.) In additional calculations, the proportion of persons born outside Finland is 10.9%. Persons with a mother tongue other than Finnish, Swedish or Sámi account for 11.4%.

== History ==
=== Under Sweden ===
Under Swedish control, soldiers, priests and officers from Sweden started to arrive in Finland. With them came also Walloons. During this time Romanis migrated from Sweden to Finland. Nowadays there are around 10,000 Finnish Kale in Finland. Many Germans, Norwegians, Danes, Swiss people, Poles, Dutch people and Scottish people settled in Finland during this period. Many big modern-day companies in Finland were started by these emigrants, including Finlayson, Fazer, Fiskars, Stockmann, Stora Enso and Paulig.

=== Grand Duchy of Finland (Russian control) ===
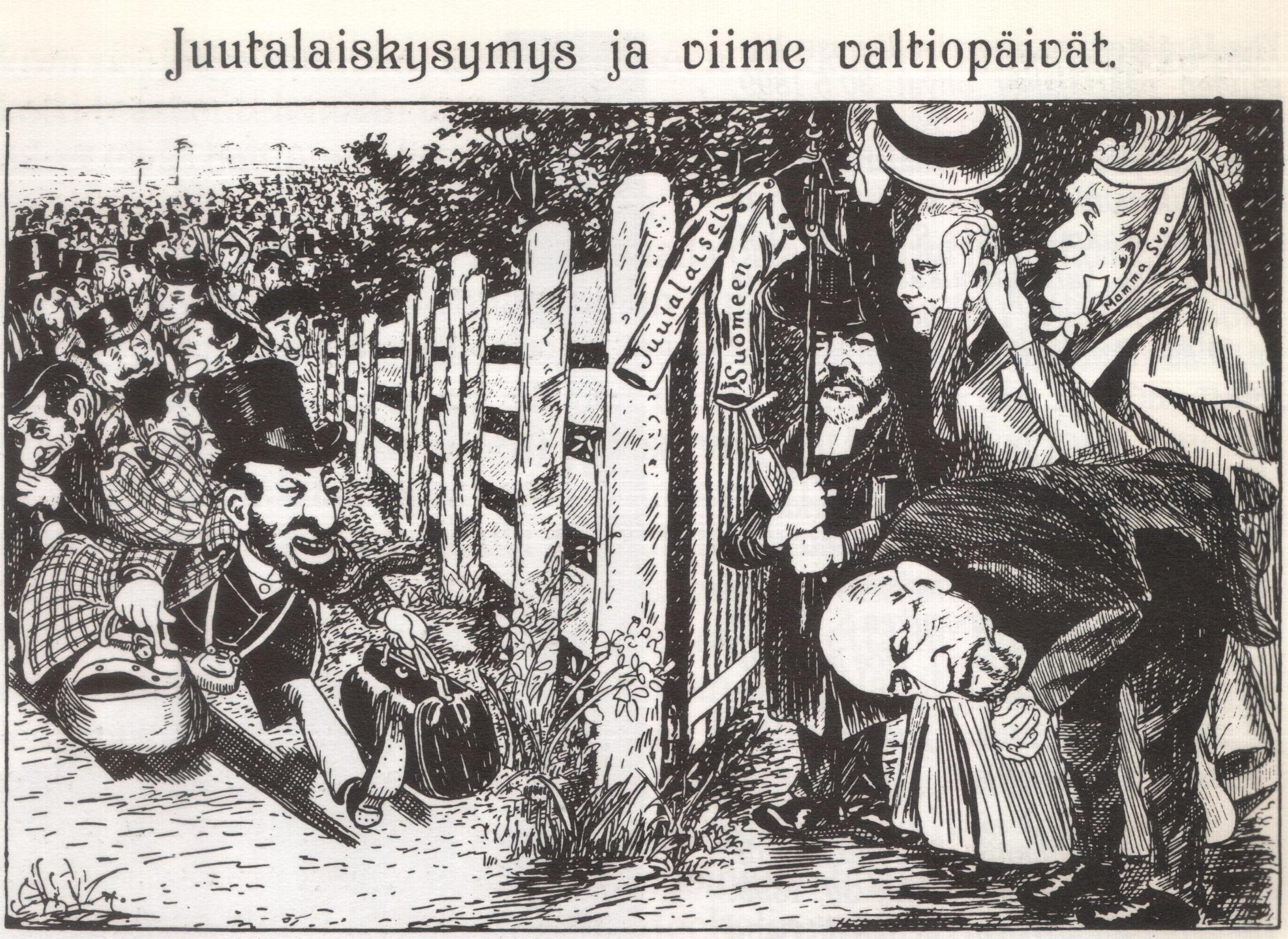
A political cartoon against the immigration of Jews, which appeared in 1897 Matti Meikäläinen issue 15.

When Finland became under Russian rule as Grand Duchy in the 1800s, Russians, Jews, Tatars and during World War I Chinese people started moving to Finland. This established small Jewish and Tatar communities in Finland. There are around 1,800 Jews and 1,000 Tatars living in Finland. When Finland gained independence in 1917, majority of the Russians and Chinese left Finland.

=== After independence and WW1 ===
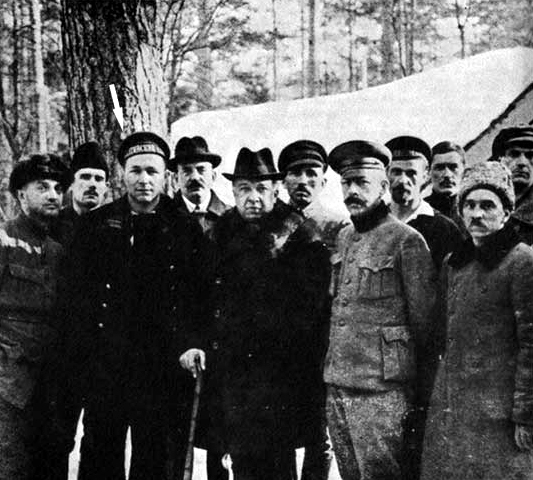
Stepan Petrichenko, the leader of the Kronstadt rebellion, and other Russians that arrived in Finland, 1921.

Finland's first immigrants arrived in the years 1917–1922, thousands of Russians escaped to Finland as a result of the Russian Revolution. Many of them died in the Finnish Civil War. In the beginning of 1919, statistics showed there were 15,457 Russians in Finland, however the actual number was likely higher. The largest refugee flow was in 1922, when 33,500 crossed over the eastern border to Finland. The refugees were St. Petersburg Finns, Ingrian Finns, Karelians, officers, factory owners and nobles, among them was the cousin of the Romanov Family, Grand Duke Kirill Vladimirovich. In 1921, after the Kronstadt rebellion, 6,400 seamen escaped over the frozen Gulf of Finland to Finland. Many of them integrated to the Finnish society, while others continued to Continental Europe. Between 1917 and 1939, 44,000 refugees sought asylum in Finland. In other estimates, between 1917 and 1939 as many as 100,000 sought security in Finland.

Immigrant statistics from 1924:

Foreign citizens
Country	1924
Soviet Union	16,921
Sweden	4,080
Germany	1,645
Norway	457
Denmark	379
Switzerland	269
Total	24,451

=== World War II ===
Immigrants from opposing sides of the war were sent to Internment camps and Nazi concentration camps in Nazi Germany. During the war, Ingrian Finns and Estonians migrated to Finland. Most of the people that did not manage to escape to the west were sent to the Soviet Union. When Finland ceded parts of its territory to the Soviet Union, 430,000 people from there had to be evacuated. This was 12% of Finland's population at the time. When Finland annexed these parts back in the Continuation War, 260,000 of them returned home. After the Soviet Union annexed these parts again, the population there had to be evacuated yet again. These evacuees were housed and settled to the remaining parts of Finland by the state.

=== After WW2 ===
Immigration after the war halted. The geopolitical state of the country and difficult economic situation did not attract immigrants. The number of foreign citizens during this time stayed stable, at 10,000. Between 1950 and 1975 it only grew by 1,000.

The immigration during the 1970s and 1980s consisted mainly of returning Finnish expats. Between 1981 and 1989, 70% of all immigration were Finns returning. In 1980, there were 12,843 foreign citizens. The largest groups were from Sweden, Germany, the United Kingdom, the Soviet Union and Denmark.

Foreign citizens in 1980
Country	1980
Sweden	3,105
Germany	1,493
UK	980
Soviet Union	858
Denmark	403
Norway	306
Poland	290
Switzerland	282
Italy	275
France	262
Netherlands	252
Spain	240
Austria	162
Greece	123
Turkey	114
Hungary	81
Ireland	44
Yugoslavia	42
Bulgaria	38
Portugal	34
Belgium	31
Romania	25
Iceland	20
Other Europe	53
Americas	1,650
Asia	833
Africa	349
Oceania	157
No citizenship	340
Unknown	1

=== Refugee waves ===
The first refugee wave to Finland after the wars happened when the 1973 Chilean coup d'état started. 200 Chilean refugees arrived in Finland during the 1970s. They were not welcomed warmly, as they were one of Finland's very first non-white minorities. Most of the original 200 refugees returned to Chile. In 2017 there were 1,000 Chileans in Finland.

The second, and much larger refugee wave happened when Vietnamese boat people came to Finland in the 1980s. Around 800 of them arrived. The Vietnamese community has grown into 10,817 by 2017. In 1990 after the breakup of Yugoslavia, thousands of refugees came to Finland, with most being Kosovars and Bosniaks. Immigrants from Yugoslavia now constitute the fourth or third largest immigrant group in Finland. They have established huge communities in Vantaa, Turku, Espoo and Närpes.

The most notable refugee waves are from Somalia and Iraq. The first Somalis arrived to Finland via the Soviet Union. The Somali-speaking population in Finland has grown from zero to 21,000 between 1990 and 2018. In 2017, 55% of Somalis in Finland were unemployed.

In 2014, Finland took 1,030 quota refugees, and an additional 3,651 people sought asylum. Of the asylum seekers, 1,346 were positive and 2,050 negative. Nearly one in two asylum seekers identity is not verified, mainly due to lack of passports. In 2008, 4,000 asylum seekers arrived in Finland. This grew to 6,000 in 2009, though it dropped to 4,000 in 2010. In 2011, 2012 and 2013 3,000 asylum seekers arrived in each year. The number grew to 32,400 in 2015, which was Europe's fourth largest in terms of population. It then dropped to 5,600 in 2016 and 5,100 in 2017.

On 13 September 2015, it was reported that the local authorities had estimated the flow of 300 asylum seekers per day entering via the northern land border from Sweden into Tornio, which is the main route of migration flow into Finland. The total number of asylum seekers for the year was reported to be over 2.6 times the total amount for the whole of the previous year. During October 2015, 7,058 new asylum seekers arrived in Finland. In mid-October the number of asylum seekers entering Finland during 2015 reached 27,000, which is, in relation to the country's size, the fourth-largest in Europe. In late November, the number passed 30,000, nearly ten-fold increase compared to the previous year.

More than 60% of asylum seekers who arrived during 2015 came from Iraq. In late October, the Finnish Immigration Service (Migri) changed its guidelines about areas in Iraq which are recognised as safe by the Finnish authorities, putting Iraqi asylum seekers under closer scrutiny. The Interior Minister Petteri Orpo estimated that two in three of recent asylum seekers come to Finland in hopes of higher standard of living. In November, the Permanent Secretary of the Interior Ministry stated that approximately 60–65% of the recent applications for asylum will be denied.

In 2017, hundreds of Muslim asylum seekers from Iraq and Afghanistan converted to Christianity after having had their first asylum application rejected by the Finnish Immigration Service (Migri), in order to re-apply for asylum on the grounds of religious persecution.

Asylum seekers 1990–2019
Country	1990–2019
Iraq	33,448
Somalia	11,007
(Socialist Federal Republic of Yugoslavia) Yugoslavia	10,708
Afghanistan	9,504
Russia	8,101
Bulgaria	3,504
Syria	3,235
Iran incl. (Kurdistan province)	3,172
Slovakia	2,896
Turkey	2,813
Nigeria	1,960
Romania	1,953
Poland	1,603
Albania	1,569
Ukraine	1,088
Belarus	1,034
Algeria	1,030
Other	18,403
Total	117,028

Other refugee groups have arrived from Eritrea, Lebanon, DR Congo, Nigeria, Cameroon, Georgia and Pakistan.

=== EU membership and the 1990s ===
The Soviet Union collapsed in 1991. Since then immigration into Finland has greatly increased. By joining the Schengen Area, immigration to Finland has been easier. Finland allowed Ingrian Finns to migrate back to Finland as returnees. Since then, around 35,000 Ingrians have moved to Finland.

Finland joined the EU in 1995. This enabled freedom of movement. This has brought construction workers from France, Estonia and Poland.

Change in immigrant population of the EU 2004 and 2007 enlargement countries between 2003 and 2021:

1. Estonia +41,837
2. Romania +4,721
3. Poland +4,464
4. Latvia +3,234
5. Bulgaria +2,524
6. Hungary +1,789
7. Lithuania +1,499
8. Czech Republic +751
9. Slovakia +419
10. Slovenia +92
11. Cyprus +63
12. Malta +29
- Total +61,422

During 2021, 2,368 Estonian citizens, 655 Romanian citizens, 604 Latvian citizens and 453 Polish citizens immigrated to Finland. A total of 4,954 people immigrated from the Eastern EU member states, 61% of all incoming EU immigrants and 18% of all immigrants.

=== Modern day ===
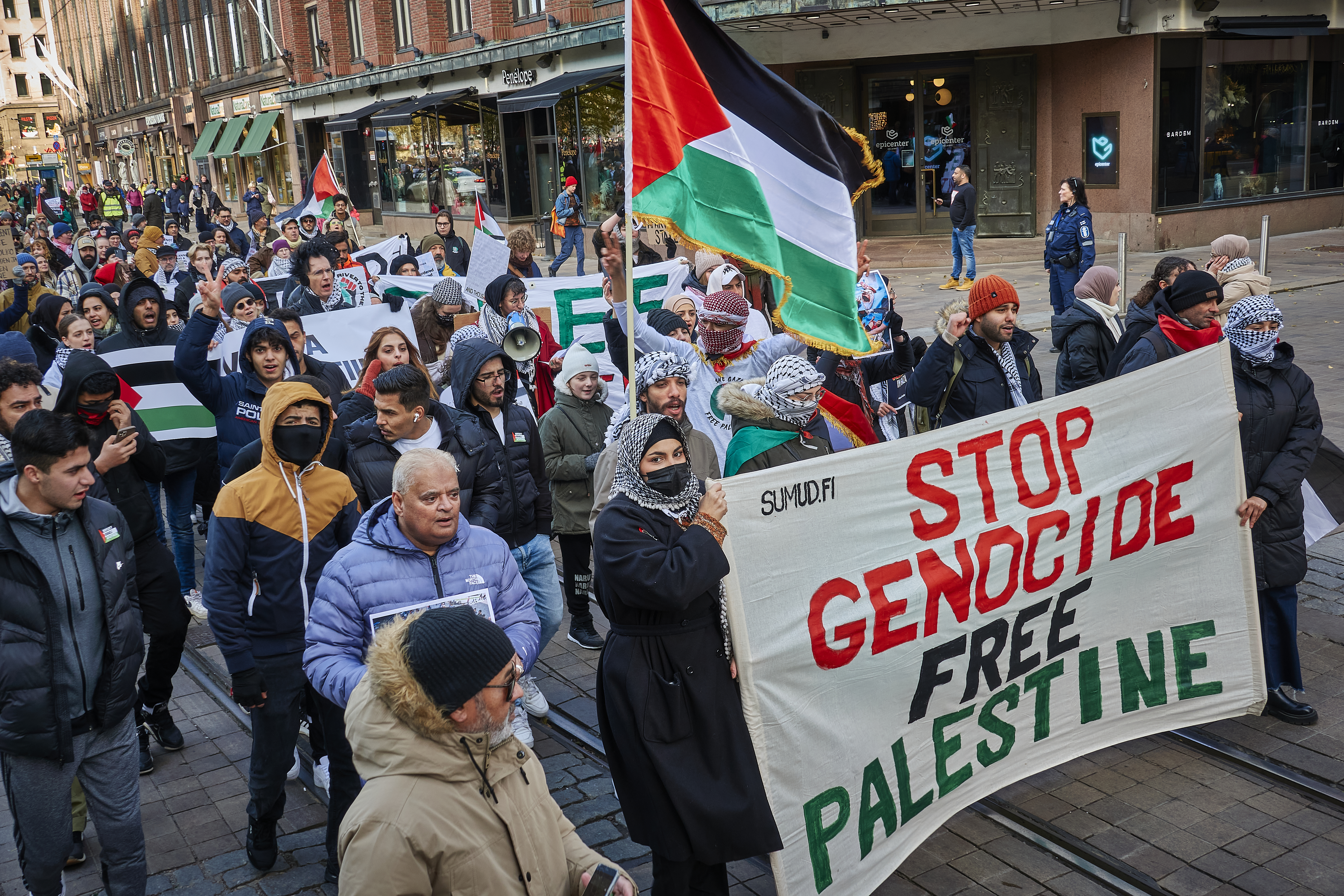
Pro-Palestinian protest in Helsinki, 21 October 2023

The most common reasons to immigrate to Finland are family reasons (32%), work (30%) and education (21%).

In 2017, hundreds of Muslim asylum seekers from Iraq and Afghanistan converted to Christianity after having had their first asylum application rejected by the Finnish Immigration Service (Migri), in order to re-apply for asylum on the grounds of religious persecution.

In September 2022, Finland announced that it would not offer asylum to Russians fleeing mobilization.

=== Chronology of 2015 ===
- On 13 September 2015, it was reported that the local authorities had estimated the flow of 300 asylum seekers per day entering via the northern land border from Sweden into Tornio, which is the main route of migration flow into Finland. The total number of asylum seekers for the year was reported to be over 2.6 times the total amount for the whole of the previous year.
- During October 2015, 7,058 new asylum seekers arrived in Finland. In mid-October the number of asylum seekers entering Finland during 2015 reached 27,000, which is, in relation to the country's size, the fourth-largest in Europe. In late November, the number passed 30,000, nearly ten-fold increase compared to the previous year. In September, The Finnish Immigration Service (Migri) estimated that processing time of an asylum application may be extended from normal six months up to two years. In late November, the reception centers were reported to be rapidly running out of space, forcing the authorities resorting to refurbished shipping containers and tents to house new asylum seekers. The Interior Minister Petteri Orpo estimated that two in three asylum seekers come to Finland in hopes of higher standard of living.
- In November, the Permanent Secretary of the Interior Ministry stated that approximately 60–65% of the recent applications for asylum will be denied. More than 60% of asylum seekers who arrived during 2015 came from Iraq.
- In late October, The Finnish Immigration Service (Migri) changed its guidelines about areas in Iraq which are recognised as safe by the Finnish authorities, putting Iraqi asylum seekers under closer scrutiny.
- In late November, it was reported that more than 700 Iraqis had voluntarily cancelled their asylum applications during September and October. According to the officials of Migri, some of the Iraqi asylum seekers have had erroneous assumptions about the country's asylum policy.
- On 22 November 2015, it was reported that Finland had appealed to Russia with a proposal to prohibit the crossings at some of the land borders by bicycle.
- On 27 December 2015, it was reported that Finland had blocked access for people to cross over two Russian border crossings (Raja-Jooseppi and Salla) by bicycles. Many asylum seekers were reported to have earlier crossed the border by bicycles.
- On 3 December, the Interior Minister Petteri Orpo announced that special repatriation centers would be established. These centers would be inhabited by the asylum seekers whose applications were declined. While he stressed that these camps would not be prisons, he described the inhabitants would be under strict surveillance.
- On 4 December 2015, Finland reportedly closed one of its northern border checkpoints before the scheduled time along the Finnish–Russian border. According to Russian media, due to the closure, asylum seekers could not enter the country.
- On 12 December 2015, Finnish Interior Minister Petteri Orpo announced that if the external borders of EU cannot be secured, then Schengen, Dublin and in a way the whole EU is under serious threat. Further he noted that Finland has imprisoned two asylum seekers, charging them with 11 cases of murder. According to Orpo, because of the failure in registering asylum seekers at the external borders, they can travel all the way to Finland via northern Sweden. He noted that border controls have been improved in harbours, airports and land border crossings with Sweden.

=== Chronology of 2016 ===
- On 2 January 2016, it was reported that Finland had issued a command for the Finnlines ferry crossing from Germany to Finland to refuse boarding asylum seekers without visa. German NGOs criticised the decision, and it was still unclear how it could be enforced, especially as a direct visa from Germany to Finland is not available.
- On 23 January 2016, it was reported, that Finnish Foreign Minister Timo Soini concluded that "closing the eastern border is possible". He stated that if an asylum seeker does not have need for protection, they will lose their money and get themselves deported. As Finland was struggling with a declining economy and increasing unemployment, he noted that resources of police forces, border control, security "need to be organized". On 24 January, YLE, Finland's national public-broadcasting company, reported that a Russian border guard had admitted that the Federal Security Service was enabling migrants to enter Finland.
- On 23 February, the Finnish press reported that the profile of national origin of asylum seekers had changed, with a rise of Indian and Bangladeshi asylum seekers, so that the third largest group of asylum seekers after Afghans and Iraqis were Indians, the fourth Syrians and the fifth Bangladeshis.

=== 2023 ===
In November of 2023, Finnish Prime Minister Petteri Orpo announced the closure of all but the northernmost border crossing with Russia, amid a sudden increase in asylum seekers seeking to enter Finland via Russia. Finland accused Russia of deliberately using refugees as weapons as part of its hybrid warfare following worsening relations between the two countries. Frontex subsequently announced that the EU would assist Finland in securing its eastern border.

== Demographics ==
Finnish and foreign born population pyramid in 2021

=== Sources of immigration ===
Net immigrants in Finland 2021
Rank	Country	Number	Percentage
1	Russia	2,390	10.4
2	Ukraine	1,422	6.2
3	Estonia	1,358	5.9
4	China	1,005	4.4
5	India	1,003	4.4
6	Iraq	890	3.9
7	Vietnam	740	3.2
8	Iran	661	2.9
9	Sweden	651	2.8
10	Turkey	651	2.8
	Top 10 total	10,771	47.0
	Other	12,134	53.0
	Total	22,905	100

=== Adoption ===
Between 1987 and 2021, a total of 5,708 people were adopted in Finland who were born in another country. This comprised 42% of all adoptions during the time period.

Adoptions by country of birth 1987–2021:

1. China (1,033)
2. Russia (860)
3. Thailand (785)
4. Colombia (594)
5. South Africa (541)
6. Soviet Union (288)
7. Ethiopia (287)
8. Philippines (239)
9. India (202)
10. Estonia (152)

608 were adopted from other countries while for 119 adoptions the country was unknown.

=== Population by origin and background countries ===
Countries of origin with more than 5,000 people
Country	1990	2000	2010	2020	2025
Soviet Union (Note: This includes people born in Estonia, Ukraine and other former Soviet states, if they were born during the Soviet Union. The total number of people with a background in former Soviet territories was 219,152 in 2025.)	9,891	36,359	59,834	81,103	114,779
(European Union) Estonia	341	7,338	25,513	50,590	51,165
Iraq	203	3,686	9,127	25,439	31,215
Somalia	49	6,256	12,868	22,534	28,167
Ukraine	4	171	858	3,498	25,065
Philippines	248	752	1,775	6,315	20,332
India	434	1,182	4,306	9,632	20,312
China	441	2,291	6,926	13,323	20,227
Vietnam	1,841	4,079	6,566	12,532	18,839
Yugoslavia (Note: The total number of people with a background in former Yugoslav territories was 22,211 in 2025.)	128	5,270	9,303	13,790	17,027
Afghanistan	5	384	3,421	11,215	16,439
Turkey	412	2,323	6,072	10,827	15,490
Iran	516	2,650	5,164	9,418	15,164
Russia	96	1,424	3,831	9,698	14,843
Bangladesh	95	479	1,673	4,372	13,712
Thailand	387	1,794	6,747	10,210	12,547
Syria	38	211	521	8,635	12,539
Nepal	6	89	1,176	4,591	12,408
Sri Lanka	107	330	773	1,544	11,373
Pakistan	130	436	1,514	4,497	11,098
Nigeria	89	303	1,496	4,150	8,516
(European Union) Sweden	3,001	3,981	6,006	7,290	8,269
(European Union) Romania	153	760	1,880	5,218	6,456
(European Union) Germany	1,649	2,423	4,179	5,161	6,203
(European Union) Poland	965	1,193	2,880	5,563	6,203
United Kingdom	1,181	2,086	3,309	4,872	5,617
DR Congo	6	451	1,548	3,965	5,439
Morocco	395	1,151	2,136	3,899	5,161
United States	2,017	2,229	2,749	3,936	5,132
Other countries	12,790	21,164	42,915	86,214	121,231

Other countries (1990-2021)
Country	1990	2000	2010	2021
(European Union) Latvia	9	256	1,071	3,626
(European Union) Italy	475	958	1,790	3,395
(European Union) Spain	473	779	1,650	3,371
(European Union) France	507	1,089	1,936	3,129
(European Union) Bulgaria	248	508	1,169	3,123
Ethiopia	108	642	1,455	3,100
(European Union) Hungary	540	933	1,669	2,777
Ghana	67	322	1,070	2,611
Brazil	153	289	980	2,368
Myanmar	7	73	1,425	2,154
(European Union) Lithuania	0	204	786	2,130
Sudan	11	72	1,227	2,080
Kenya	71	173	881	2,062
Norway	852	954	1,520	1,971
(European Union) Netherlands	391	732	1,272	1,874
Egypt	195	422	808	1,808
(European Union) Greece	302	468	698	1,779
Cameroon	4	33	600	1,773
Canada	905	1,181	1,453	1,755
Eritrea	0	17	94	1,680
Japan	240	507	997	1,547
Algeria	210	467	826	1,521
Albania	0	42	197	1,465
Australia	426	656	960	1,402
Colombia	124	418	854	1,380
Bosnia	0	1,627	1,779	1,329
Gambia	23	206	492	1,281
Switzerland	409	615	912	1,247
Mexico	63	153	518	1,224
South Africa	108	208	621	1,216
Tunisia	145	312	671	1,197
(European Union) Denmark	527	708	865	1,167
(European Union) Czech Republic	245	342	611	1,139
Uzbekistan	0	91	159	1,129
(European Union) Portugal	54	118	349	937
Lebanon	109	325	537	903
South Korea	36	108	348	896
Indonesia	34	133	332	876
(European Union) Belgium	107	206	452	852
Israel	330	465	708	795
Moldova	0	12	100	778
Belarus	0	167	393	739
(Republic of Ireland) (European Union) Ireland	83	200	433	736
(European Union) Austria	238	312	512	715
Serbia	0	0	894	715
(European Union) Slovakia	0	51	258	711
Angola	3	143	497	684
Peru	66	176	402	678
Chile	183	227	369	668
Cuba	17	153	359	637
Tanzania	56	146	424	630
Saudi Arabia	16	201	243	599
Malaysia	134	224	372	585
Rwanda	2	29	238	576
Argentina	101	157	290	571
Zambia	42	70	148	547
(European Union) Croatia	0	260	281	535
Kazakhstan	0	295	318	490
Jordan	51	135	253	458
Cambodia	78	149	283	429
Yemen	3	23	38	423
Uganda	7	29	145	416
Venezuela	14	34	107	388
UAE	13	36	78	353
Kuwait	3	49	116	330
Libya	19	68	162	313
Singapore	29	60	148	308
New Zealand	34	86	178	294
Ecuador	15	45	150	292
Senegal	10	34	123	272
North Macedonia	0	144	199	270
Dominican Republic	9	41	121	240
Azerbaijan	0	10	83	228
(European Union) Cyprus	40	76	121	228
Iceland	74	120	150	199
Nicaragua	5	49	86	198
Sierra Leone	20	52	119	194
Bolivia	15	50	122	191
Liberia	6	46	138	191
(European Union) Slovenia	0	10	80	184
Cote d'Ivoire	12	50	98	179
Congo	17	18	114	172
Namibia	48	29	71	170
Zimbabwe	9	23	62	168
Georgia	0	65	65	163
Armenia	0	25	85	162
Burundi	3	6	49	159
Guinea	4	9	55	153
Honduras	4	15	37	144
Uruguay	32	51	80	134
Kyrgyzstan	0	5	80	133
(European Union) Luxembourg	18	32	75	122
Togo	3	14	56	114
Mongolia	1	16	48	111
Palestine	1	7	32	108
(European Union) Malta	8	21	31	84

=== Distribution ===
Population with a foreign-background by municipality in 2025
№	Municipality	Foreign-background	%
1.	Helsinki	150,074	21.6
2.	Espoo	84,777	26.0
3.	Vantaa	77,115	30.5
4.	Turku	38,253	18.3
5.	Tampere	31,727	12.1
6.	Oulu	15,154	7.0
7.	Lahti	13,778	11.3
8.	Jyväskylä	12,176	8.1
9.	Vaasa	10,932	15.4
10.	Kuopio	9,352	7.4

Immigrants overwhelmingly settle in cities; 85% of immigrants in Finland live in cities and their surroundings. Only 11% live in the countryside, with most of them being from other European countries. Immigrants from the Middle East and Africa are the most heavily concentrated group in cities. 47.4% live in the capital region (compared to 22.7% of the entire population), where they make up 24.4% of the population.

=== Employment ===
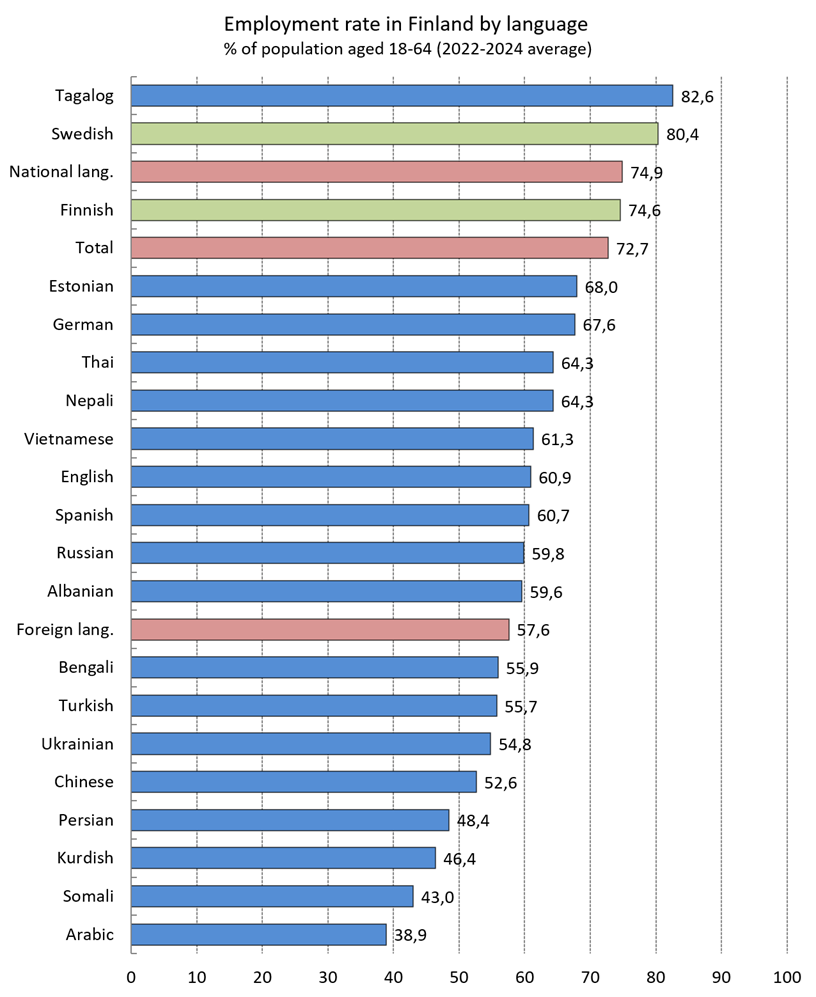
Employment rate in Finland by language.

The most common job for immigrants in 2017 was real estate cleaner, at 11,328. The second most common was restaurant jobs at 10,696, and the third was labour hire at 8,437. Immigrants make up 26.9% of real estate cleaners, despite only making up 6.3% of the population.

Around 20,000 immigrants in Finland are searching for jobs. Around 70% of net immigrants are in the working age (18–64), and most of them are young adults.

The unemployment rate among Finnish-born was 12.4% in 2020, while it was 23.6% among immigrants born abroad. Immigrants from other EU-countries had the lowest unemployment rate (16.9%), while African immigrants had the highest rate (32.5%).

== Immigrant languages ==
Immigration has greatly increased the number of languages spoken in Finland. In 1990, there were 6 foreign languages in Finland with over 1,000 speakers. In 2021, that number has jumped to 46. The most spoken immigrant languages are Russian (87,600), Estonian (50,200), Arabic (36,500), English (25,600), Somali (23,700), Persian (16,400) and Kurdish (16,000). In total 458,000 people speak an immigrant language, which is 8.3% of the population.

In 1990, the most spoken ones were Russian (3,900), English (3,600), German (2,400), Vietnamese (1,600), Estonian (1,400) and Arabic (1,100). The total number of foreign language speakers was less than 25,000 (0.5%).

== Citizenship ==
From 1990 to 2021, a total of 159,342 foreigners have acquired Finnish citizenship. In 2018, 97% of foreigners who were granted Finnish citizenship, kept their previous nationality. Finland had the fourth highest naturalisation rate (proportionally to population of non-national residents) in the EU in 2020. 16% of Finnish citizenships granted were granted to other EU citizens in 2021.

Finnish citizenships granted by previous nationality since 2015
Country	2015	2016	2017	2018	2019	2020	2021
Russia	1,728	2,028	2,758	1,766	1,946	1,546	1,161
Iraq	560	534	742	621	589	602	744
Somalia	955	1,066	957	856	583	541	436
Estonia	420	459	705	541	658	516	370
Syria	28	47	118	118	299	205	360
Sweden	165	206	212	210	248	196	282
Afghanistan	242	376	469	339	309	264	227
Thailand	150	193	261	249	281	304	209
Ukraine	145	163	281	202	255	220	171
Iran	140	222	309	244	205	156	155
Vietnam	146	225	249	197	221	148	140
Turkey	229	264	313	210	260	172	125
Nepal	74	123	178	125	132	119	106
India	137	193	245	154	174	181	105
Philippines	79	106	141	182	225	124	97
Democratic Republic of the Congo	131	150	223	183	138	100	96
Serbia and Montenegro	73	108	42	183	214	134	81
United Kingdom	26	31	147	134	211	126	80
Bangladesh	100	140	176	105	97	72	80
Nigeria	179	175	283	157	113	100	67
Pakistan	135	143	228	110	121	70	59
Ethiopia	56	87	118	80	53	39	58
Poland	61	69	111	72	93	64	55
Morocco	77	67	110	71	77	69	43
Bosnia and Herzegovina	66	83	87	120	66	84	37
China	130	140	190	91	89	70	35
Myanmar	89	129	130	162	105	75	35
Ghana	63	90	112	80	61	38	20
Total	7,921	9,375	12,219	9,211	9,649	7,816	6,643

=== Dual nationals ===
In 2025, there were 432,654 foreign-citizens in Finland without Finnish citizenship, representing 7.7% of the population. Additionally 197,944 Finnish citizens in Finland also held foreign citizenship, 3.5%. If a person has two nationalities and one of them is Finnish, Finnish is their first nationality in statistics. A new nationality act came into force on 1 June 2003, allowing foreign nationals to naturalize without renouncing their original citizenship.

Top 10 largest groups of foreign nationalities in 2025
Rank	Country	Sole	Country	Dual
1.	Ukraine	49,369	Russia	42,115
2.	Estonia	48,894	Iraq	12,522
3.	Russia	33,848	Sweden	11,360
4.	Philippines	17,663	Somalia	10,632
5.	India	16,842	Estonia	9,310
6.	China	16,680	Afghanistan	6,955
7.	Iraq	12,586	Iran	5,586
8.	Vietnam	11,311	United States	5,374
9.	Bangladesh	10,766	Turkey	5,357
10.	Sri Lanka	10,329	Vietnam	5,304

== Effects of immigration ==
=== Costs ===
According to a macroeconomic study immigrants, refugees and migrants, arriving Finland benefits its economy within five years of arrival. In the case of asylum seekers the reach positive effect to the economy takes longer, from three to seven years. In Finland, asylum seekers face many restrictions on working that slows down their possibilities to contribute to the economy.

Most of immigration's cost to the society consists of welfare. Because immigrant families have on average more children than their Finnish counterparts, they receive more welfare. Income support, housing benefits and unemployment benefits of immigrants cost nearly 300 million euros in 2009, and the social and health benefits of immigrants cost 200 million euro annually. Around 110–112 million euros goes to refugee quotas.

According to the Ministry of the Interior (Finland) in 2009, asylum seekers in Finland during their asylum process received one of the highest rates of benefits in Europe.

=== Crime ===
First records of immigrant crime was in 1919–1932, when the Prohibition in Finland started. Most of the alcohol were smuggled from Estonia or other European countries, like Poland and Germany. The smugglers were usually Finns, Germans, Swedes or Estonians. In the late 1990s, Estonia became a transit country for drugs that were brought to Finland. Both Finns and Estonians have managed the trade together.

In the last 10 years immigrant crime has increased by 56%. As high as 90% of burglaries in Finland are done by immigrants.

In 2016, illegal drugs like Rivotril were beginning to be sold in Helsinki Railway Square, Itäkeskus and Kallio by foreigners from Central Europe. Furthermore, seizures of cocaine have been increasing to some extent in recent years.

In 2011, of all the immigrants in prison, 27% were Estonian citizens, 13% Romanian citizens, 10% Russian citizens and 6% Lithuanian citizens.

Even though less than 5% of the Finnish population consists of foreign citizens, they account for 25% of reported sex crimes. In 2018, 1393 cases of rape were reported to the police. According to official statistics from 2005, 27% of all rapes in Finland were committed by foreigners, even though they only comprised 2.2% of the population back then. Many of them are Afghans and Iraqis .

=== Illegal immigrants ===
There are around 3,000–10,000 illegal immigrants in Finland living in 42 of the 309 Finnish municipalities, with the highest number living in Helsinki.

== Discrimination ==
According to a study done by the European Union Agency for Fundamental Rights in 2017, 60% of Sub-Saharan African immigrants in Finland had experienced discrimination in the past five years. This was significantly higher than the EU average of 39%. Women and first-generation immigrants experienced the most discrimination. Most discrimination was faced in public and private services. It was also experienced during studying, job seeking and at work. Most discrimination goes unreported, though the ones living in Finland reported the most. Roughly a third of respondents had reported their discrimination.

24.1% of Finnish women with a foreign-background and 32.4% of men had experienced physical or psychological abuse over the previous year in 2018. Asian women (excluding West Asia) experienced the least amount of abuse (19.7%) while Sub-Saharan African men experienced the most (49%). Harassment experienced by people with a foreign-background varies depending on the region. Foreigners in Ostrobothnia had the lowest share of people who had experienced abuse (15.2%) while those in Päijät-Häme had the highest share (32.1%). The region which contains the vast majority of foreigners had the second highest share (30.3%).

== Public opinion ==
In 1993, Finns were most accepting of Norwegian, Ingrian, British, American and Swedish migrants. They were least accepting of Russian, Yugoslavian, Turkish, African, Vietnamese and Chilean migrants.

In a 2015 online survey by YLE, Finns were most accepting of German, Swedish, Estonian, British and US American immigrants. In the same survey Iran, Iraq and Romania were the least accepted countries of origin of foreign immigrants.

According to a 2016 poll, many Finns were concerned simultaneously about unemployed immigrants and immigrants taking local jobs.

== Comparison with other European Union countries 2023 ==
According to Eurostat 59.9 million people lived in the European Union in 2023 who were born outside their resident country. This corresponds to 13.35% of the total EU population. Of these, 31.4 million (9.44%) were born outside the EU and 17.5 million (3.91%) were born in another EU member state.

Country	Total population (1000)	Total Foreign-born (1000)	%	Born in other EU state (1000)	%	Born in a non EU state (1000)	%
EU 27	448,754	59,902	13.3	17,538	3.9	31,368	6.3
Germany	84,359	16,476	19.5	6,274	7.4	10,202	12.1
France	68,173	8,942	13.1	1,989	2.9	6,953	10.2
Spain	48,085	8,204	17.1	1,580	3.3	6,624	13.8
Italy	58,997	6,417	10.9	1,563	2.6	4,854	8.2
Netherlands	17,811	2,777	15.6	748	4.2	2,029	11.4
Greece	10,414	1,173	11.3	235	2.2	938	9.0
Sweden	10,522	2,144	20.4	548	5.2	1,596	15.2
Austria	9,105	1,963	21.6	863	9.5	1,100	12.1
Belgium	11,743	2,247	19.1	938	8.0	1,309	11.1
Portugal	10,467	1,684	16.1	378	3.6	1,306	12.5
Denmark	5,933	804	13.6	263	4.4	541	9.1
Finland	5,564	461	8.3	131	2.4	330	5.9
Poland	36,754	933	2.5	231	0.6	702	1.9
Czech Republic	10,828	764	7.1	139	1.3	625	5.8
Hungary	9,600	644	6.7	342	3.6	302	3.1
Romania	19,055	530	2.8	202	1.1	328	1.7
Slovakia	5,429	213	3.9	156	2.9	57	1.0
Bulgaria	6,448	169	2.6	58	0.9	111	1.7
Ireland	5,271	1,150	21.8	348	6.6	802	15.2

== See also ==
- Opposition to immigration
- Remigration
- Timeline of the European migrant crisis
- A Moment in the Reeds, 2017 film
- Immigration to Europe
- List of countries by immigrant population
