= Oulu child sexual exploitation scandal =

2018-19 uncovering of a child sex ring among asylum seekers and refugees in Finland

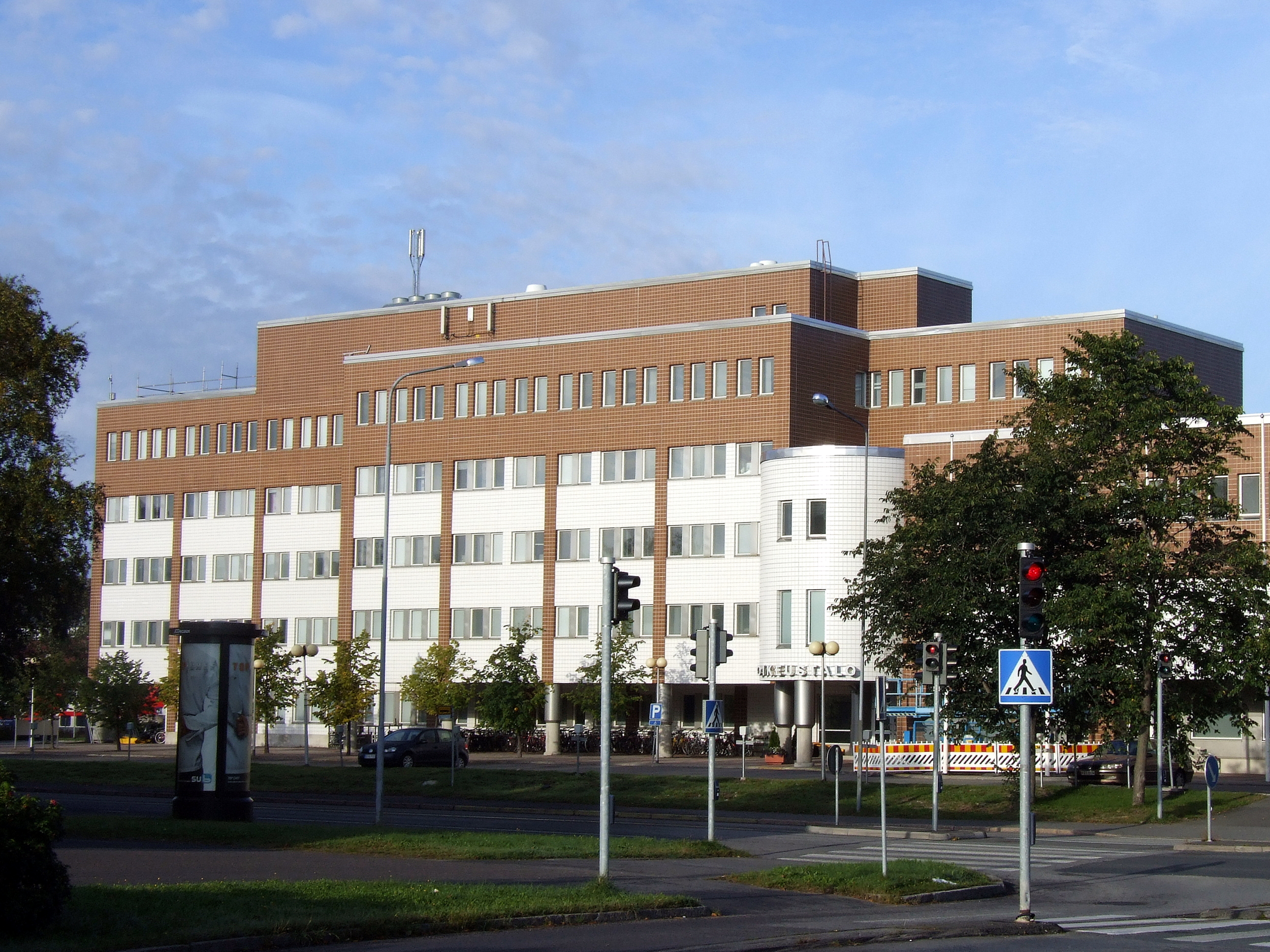
Former district court building in Oulu

In December 2018, it transpired that adult men, all of whom had arrived in Finland as asylum seekers or refugees, were grooming, and raping and otherwise sexually abusing, girls under 15 years of age in Oulu, Finland. One victim ended up committing suicide. The Oulu Police Department warned young girls and parents, while emphasizing that "not all people with foreign backgrounds are dishonest or criminals".

By mid-January 2019, the suspects numbered 16. The case was said to have "rocked" Finland, where cabinet members broke the otherwise normal Finnish taboo about commenting about ongoing criminal investigations.

== Crimes ==
The initial police report, on 1 December, was about a gang of seven foreign men who had been grooming a girl; it caused a shock among many Finns. The girl was confirmed to be Finnish and a minor, aged 10, who was raped for months. As there had been two other arrests for rape just a few days before, Criminal Commissioner Markus Kiiskinen of the Oulu Police reassured the public that "there is no phenomenon of sexual offenses in which foreigners go rape in the streets. These just happened at the same time."

Oulu police department warned young girls and parents to be on the lookout for sexual predators active on social media.

By 6 December, Oulu police had ten men under arrest for sex and violent crimes. The victims were now three girls, all under 15 years of age. All suspects had arrived in Finland as asylum claimants or refugees.

By 11 January 2019, police disclosed one of the rape victims had committed suicide months earlier. The number of victims had risen to nine. The number of men in police custody was now twelve. All suspects were foreigners.

By 16 January the suspects numbered 16, and remained all-foreign born. Police disclosed that at least one of the girls was drugged before being raped. The crimes were said to have taken place in the summer and fall 2018.

On 11 February it was reported that police had started to investigate new suspected rapes of two underage girls that had occurred a few days earlier at a private home. One of the girls was under 16 and the other under 18. One suspect was in custody. The suspect had a foreign background and a Finnish residence permit. On 13 January police announced that they were investigating another suspected aggravated rape and aggravated sexual abuse of a child. The victim was a 14-year-old girl, and the rape took place in a private apartment in January.

By late February, the police had expanded its investigation and reporting to include not just grooming cases in Oulu, but also "milder acts, such as assaults." There were now 29 suspects, of whom about 20 were "men of foreign background." In 2020, following an unsuccessful appeal initiated by eight of the foreign convicts, it was revealed that they had a common 12-13 year-old victim, whom they had gotten to know and kept in touch "mostly through various social media apps like Facebook, Instagram, Messenger and WhatsApp." The girl was victimized by the eight, but independently from each other. She will have her identity sealed for 60 years.

=== Escape ===
One of the grooming gang suspects escaped to Germany and may have gone to France. He was arrested in Germany in 2018, but was let go. The suspect is 25 or 26 years old, and is said to have raped a 13-year-old over a long period. An Iraqi national, he was again captured in Saarbrücken in 2019 while on a high-speed train from Paris to Mannheim, but it was said it could take up to four weeks to extradite him to Finland.

== Verdicts ==
Muso Asoev, born in 1975 in Tajikistan, was sentenced to three years and eight months' prison, plus compensation of €10,500 to the victim, for sexual abuse and digital penetration of a 10-year old girl inside a mosque between 7 July and 7 October 2018.

Abdullhadi Barhum, age 22 in 2019, was sentenced to two-and-half year's prison, plus compensation of €3,700 to the victim, for child sexual abuse and rape of a 14-year old girl who reached out on a popular social media for someone to buy her cigarettes, which he did, before forcing her to have oral sex.

Abdul Aziz Nayef Dbeisan Al-Bodour, aged 23 in 2019, was sentenced to 38 month's prison, plus compensation of €7,300 to the victim, for rape and gross sexual abuse of a child.

On 4 July 2019, Baraa Ahmed Saeed Al Dawayma (born 1999) was sentenced to three years and eight months' prison, for aggravated sexual abuse of a child and aggravated rape. The victim was 12 years old, and the crimes took place in July 2018.

On 12 July 2019, Oulu District Court gave the last sentences concerning the cases involving eight foreign-born men who abused the same female victim who was 12–13 years old during the crimes. The outcome was:

Convict	Birth year	Country of origin	Date of conviction	Sentence	Crime(s)	Victim's age during crime(s)	Date(s) of crime(s)
Rahmani Gheibali	1998	Afghanistan	9 May 2019	4 years	Aggravated sexual abuse of a child, aggravated rape	13	April – September 2018
Shiraqa Yosefi	1998		14 May 2019	2 years	Aggravated sexual abuse of a child	13	15 September – 27 October 2018
Osman Ahmed Mohamed Humad	1995		5 June 2019	3 years	Aggravated sexual abuse of a child, persuading a child for sexual purposes	13	June – October 2018
Javad Mirzad	1990	Afghanistan	7 June 2019	3 years and 4 months	Aggravated sexual abuse of a child	13	August 2018
Ali Osman Mohamed	1993		20 June 2019	4 years	Aggravated rape, aggravated sexual abuse of a child, persuading a child for sexual purposes	13	Summer and autumn 2018
Hassan Mohamud Mohamed	1980		9 July 2019	4 years and 6 months	Aggravated rape, aggravated sexual abuse of a child	12–13	2017–2018
Qayssar Mohsin Sbahi Aldhulaiei	1993	Iraq	12 July 2019	4 years	Aggravated rape, aggravated sexual abuse of a child, assault	13	June – October 2018
Abdo Ibrahim Ahmed	1985		12 July 2019	4 years and 2 months	Aggravated rape, aggravated sexual abuse of a child, possession of child pornography		4 August 2017 – 18 August 2018

== Reactions ==
In early December 2018, Finnish Prime Minister Juha Sipilä said, "The guilty parties will be punished regardless of their ethnicity in a state of law." In mid-January 2019, Sipilä issued a formal statement, saying "The government has changed the law since the beginning of the year, making it easier to expel foreigners who have committed crimes."

In January, when new cases were revealed, he issued a formal statement on the presidential website: "It is unacceptable that some asylum seekers and even those who have been granted asylum have brought evil here and created insecurity here."

Minister of the Interior Kai Mykkänen said these things shouldn't be occurring in Finland and called for immigrants residing at reception centres to be educated.

Paula Risikko, Speaker of the Parliament, said "We’ll deliver punishments for these kinds of crimes and, if necessary, send you back to your home country.”

Antti Kaikkonen, head of the Centre Party in Parliament, declared "everyone who comes to Finland has to follow the local laws."

== Politics and law ==
Reuters reported that the case had become "an important political issue" in Finnish politics. Xinhua News Agency reported the alleged raping by eight men of foreign descent had increased populist support in Finland.

As a response to the sex crimes revelations, three fast-track legislative projects were introduced in Parliament in January: one to increase penalties for child sexual abuse; one to enhance the Police's ability to "process" people's personal data; and one to take away Finnish citizenship from naturalized aliens who commit certain crimes. Antti Lindtman, chairman of the Social Democratic Parliamentary Group, underscored the uniqueness of having all parliamentary groups support the initiatives.

In January 2019, the city of Oulu banned foreign asylum seekers from visiting any schools and daycare centers.

In February 2019, using the December discovery of sexual offences against minors as justification, Oulu requested a €2.3 million government grant for, among others, educate parents how to prevent sexual offenses by both Finns and foreigners. The city received €1.25 million from government ministries towards an eventual €2.8 million budget. A Finns Party member of the city council criticised the project and said that the funds would be better spent on vigilantes. The councillor then disseminated a TikTok video made by the project and ridiculed it as ineffective to avoid rape; the video was further panned by foreign right-wingers such as the American actor James Woods.

In April 2019, French newspaper Le Figaro attributed the Finns Party success in that month's Finnish elections to the immigrant sexual exploitation scandal, as did Italian newspaper La Repubblica which reported "arrests of non-EU citizens accused and suspected of sexual abuse or rape had alarmed no small part of public opinion."

== See also ==
- List of sexual abuses perpetrated by groups
- Rotherham child sexual exploitation scandal
- Sexual violence in Finland
- Anti-Afghan sentiment
