= Chinese people in Denmark =

Total population
- c. 12,000 (2018)

Regions with significant populations
- Copenhagen

Languages
- Chinese, Danish

Related ethnic groups
- Overseas Chinese, Chinese diaspora

Chinese people in Denmark form one of the smaller and less-studied Chinese diaspora communities of Europe.

== Migration history ==
The earliest Chinese migrants in Denmark are believed to have been 34 men from Guangdong who came to the famous Tivoli Gardens amusement park in 1902 as travelling performers on contracts for the summer. Though the initial understanding was that they would return to China after their work had ended, half found other employment at the end of their contracts, and thus chose to settle in Denmark. Similar forms of "coincidental arrival" would continue over the next few decades: some sailors jumped ship in Denmark or became stranded there during the 1904-05 Russo-Japanese War and later World War I, a few itinerant soapstone traders arrived from Qingtian, Zhejiang and ended up staying in the country, and other similar cases. By 1949, a total of 43 Chinese are believed to have become immigrants in Denmark; most of these were male, and among them were just four women married to Danish men. Early immigrants maintained few community links to each other or to their ancestral land, and thus were quickly assimilated into Danish society. After the 1949 establishment of the People's Republic of China, many deliberately cut off their contacts with relatives in China in fear that those relatives might suffer persecution for having foreign contacts.

Until the 1970s, immigration from China remained almost non-existent, even as growth in the Danish economy created labour shortages; immigrants from other parts of the world flowed into the country. Police statistics showed 113 people from mainland China living in Denmark as of 1969, and one researcher estimates perhaps 60 more from Hong Kong, Taiwan, and Singapore. The numbers of migrants did not reach a significant level until the 1980s and 1990s, just as Danish immigration laws were becoming more strict. By 1996, there were 3,467 migrants/descendants of migrants from mainland China, Hong Kong, Singapore, and Taiwan. These years were also marked by a shift in the gender balance of migrants, with increasing numbers of women.

Asylum seekers from the People's Republic of China are not prevalent among Chinese migrants to Denmark, even though Denmark has one of Europe's lowest rejection rates for asylum claims; such migrants prefer other countries in Southern, Central, or Eastern Europe, due to the better opportunities for work there. This contradicts claims that Chinese migrants are attracted by Denmark's generous social welfare benefits.

Statistics Denmark showed 9,799 people born in mainland China and 448 born in Taiwan living in Denmark as of October 2009.

Statistics Denmark showed in the first quarter of 2018 that 11,710 people with origins in mainland China are living in Denmark legally.

== Business and employment ==
Though early Chinese migrants consisted largely of traveling artists and merchants, after World War II, migrants concentrated increasingly in the Chinese restaurant business. Copenhagen's first Chinese restaurant, the China House, was opened by a Chinese migrant from the Netherlands who had remigrated to Denmark; four more restaurants opened up in the 1950s, and five more in the 1960s. The format of restaurants changed in the 1970s, with more grill bars. Other Chinese, even if not directly involved in the restaurant trade, were somehow involved with food in the ethnic economy; for example, the first ethnic Chinese graduate of a Danish university opened a soy sauce factory in 1957. However, the restaurant sector began to reach saturation in the 1980s; new migrants thus set up businesses in other sectors, including travel agencies, traditional Chinese medicine clinics, and import-export firms.

== Tourism ==
In 2004, 60,000 Chinese tourists visited Denmark; this number is at least projected to quadruple by 2020. The 200th anniversary of the birth of Hans Christian Andersen was a major draw for Chinese tourists to come to Denmark, as he is a major icon of Danish culture in China; however, tourists who came at that time were disappointed to find little attention devoted to him in Copenhagen. As a result of feedback from Chinese tourists, a new museum devoted to him was opened at the town hall square.

The desire by tourism authorities to attract Chinese tourists conflicts with the fears from some other government bureaux that tourism from China will become an inlet for increasing numbers of illegal immigrants. But, many Chinese travel agencies require a RMB50,000 deposit from prospective tourists to Denmark, in order to protect themselves against the penalties which may be assessed against them by the Danish government if tourists they bring to the country do not depart on time. The influx of Chinese tourists has also caused some more discussions, especially with regards to sex tourism; many male Chinese tourists seek out strip clubs, but are usually disappointed with the number of Asian women found in these clubs instead of the expected Danish women.

== People of Chinese descent in the Danish Royal Family ==
Alexandra, Countess of Frederiksborg was born in Hong Kong of mixed European and Chinese ancestry. In 1995 she married Prince Joachim of Denmark. Their two children, Count Nikolai (born 1999) and Count Felix (born 2002), are the first members of the Danish Royal Family to have Chinese descent.

== See also ==
- China–Denmark relations
- Denmark-Taiwan relations
- Kinamand, 2005 Danish-Chinese comedy drama film
- Chinese diaspora
- Immigration to Denmark
- Chinese people in Finland
- Chinese people in Sweden
