= Chinese people in Finland =

芬兰华人 Kiinalaiset Suomessa / Suomen kiinalaiset

Total population
- 19,023 born in China; 20,320 Chinese speakers (2025)

Regions with significant populations
- Helsinki, Tampere and Turku regions & Oulu

Languages
- Finnish, English, Chinese

Related ethnic groups
- Overseas Chinese

Chinese people in Finland (Chinese: 芬兰华人; pinyin: Fēnlán huárén; Finnish: Suomen kiinalaiset) are the ethnic Chinese in Finland. The majority of people have a background in the country of China. People can be born in China, have Chinese ancestry and/or be citizens of China. As of 2025, there were 19,023 people born in China living in Finland. Similarly, the number of people with Chinese citizenship was 16,680. The number of people who spoke Chinese as their mother tongue was 20,320.

Between 1987 and 2023, 1,036 Chinese children were adopted in Finland, making China one of the most common countries of origin for international adoptions there. From 1990 to 2023, a total number of 2,640 Chinese citizens had been granted Finnish citizenship.

== History ==
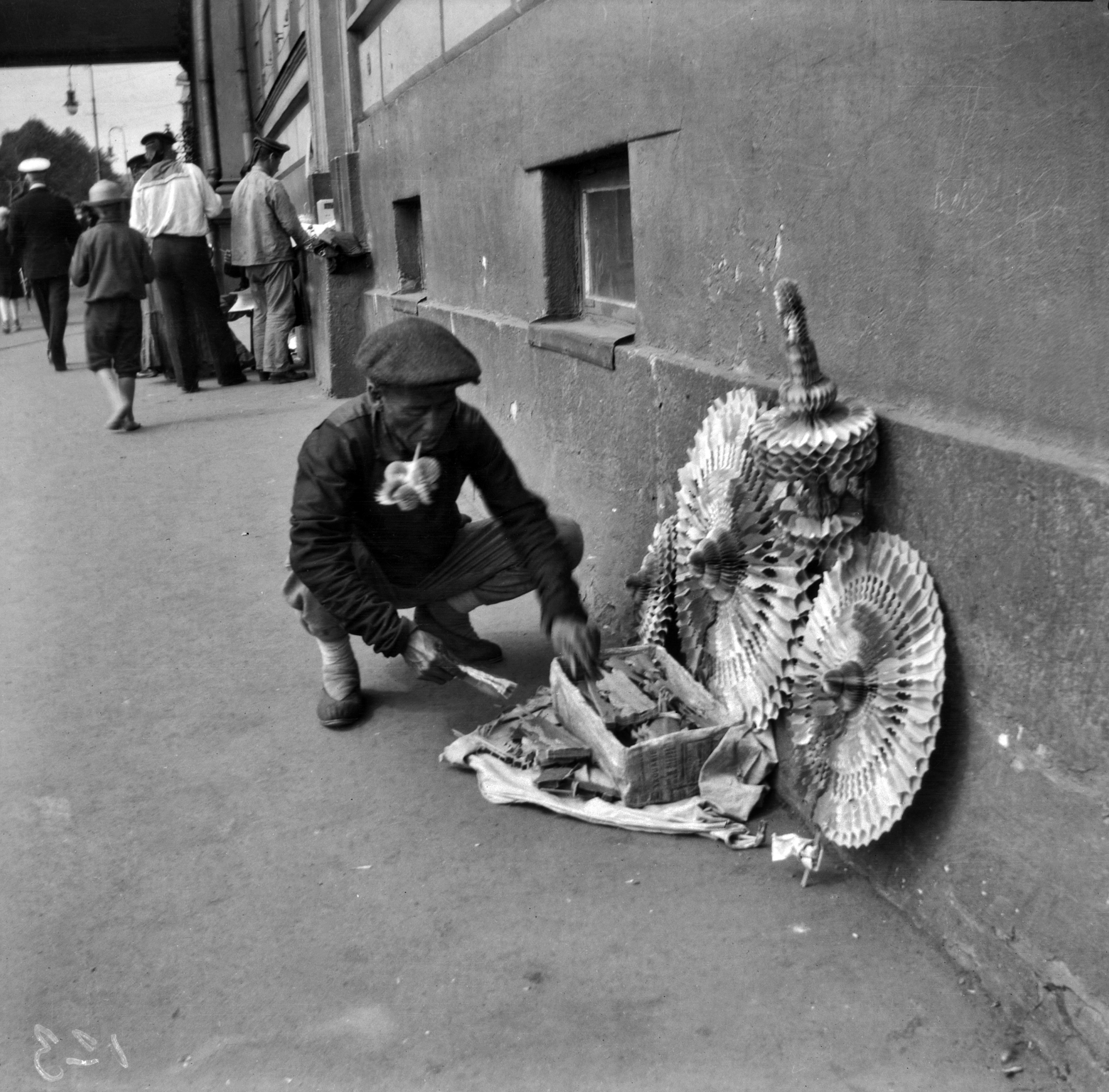
Chinese street vendor in Helsinki in the 1910s

=== Chinese migrant workers (1916–1917) ===
In 1916, while Finland was still an autonomous state ruled by the Russian Empire, a large number of Chinese migrant workers were brought by the Russians to the Helsinki metropolitan area for fortification work and the supporting task of logging. The workers were apparently Honghuzi (lit. 'Red Beards') prisoners from Manchuria. In the Russian Far East, the Honghuzi were notorious for being fierce train robbers and highway bandits. A total of around 3,000 Chinese workers were brought to Finland. The decision to resort to Chinese labor is believed to have been because Finnish migrant workers had proven to be unsuitable for the construction work on Peter the Great's Naval Fortress.

Chinese labor was deployed in places such as Espoo, Kauniainen, Vantaa, Korso, and Söderkulla in Sipoo, primarily for logging work. They were also used in Kustavi for paving the artillery roads of the naval fortress, as well as for miscellaneous tasks in various parts of the country. The Chinese workers were often housed in cold barns or shacks without proper fireplaces. Although the workers were men, many Finns mistakenly thought they were women because they had long braids at the nape of their necks.

Alongside the fortification work, the Chinese soon began committing thefts, robberies, assaults, and robberies involving murder in Finland. They would also sometimes intimidate local residents to make them leave their homes, allowing the houses to be looted. Many of them also suffered from diseases such as syphilis and scabies. The criminal activities provoked both fear and anger among the Finnish population. For example, painter Akseli Gallen-Kallela was no longer able to work in the restless conditions at Tarvaspää in Espoo, and he decided to flee with his spouse to Ruovesi.

It is reported that there were up to 1,200 Chinese individuals residing in the Espoo area. Starting from the turn of 1917, Chinese workers began to be sent back to Manchuria. After the Russian Revolution in the spring of 1917, the fortification work was halted, and most of the remaining Chinese left Finland. According to contemporaries, there also remained a Chinese-Finnish heritage in Finland as a result of relationships between Finnish women and Chinese men.

== Population by municipalities ==
Historical population
Year	Pop.	±% p.a.
1990	790	—
1995	2,180	+22.51%
2000	2,907	+5.92%
2005	4,613	+9.68%
2010	7,546	+10.34%
2015	10,722	+7.28%
2020	13,778	+5.14%
2025	20,320	+8.08%
Chinese speakers. Source: Statistics Finland

People born in China and living in Finland, according to Statistics Finland.

Country of birth China by municipality (2024)
Municipality	Population
Whole country	17,992
Helsinki	4,635
Espoo	3,964
Vantaa	1,327
Tampere	1,097
Turku	802
Oulu	771
Lahti	470
Jyväskylä	454
Lappeenranta	419
Vaasa	290
Kuopio	235
Rovaniemi	215
Joensuu	207
Pori	196
Porvoo	159
Rauma	149
Hämeenlinna	130
Kokkola	126
Kouvola	122
Kauniainen	96
Hyvinkää	94
Salo	91
Kirkkonummi	78
Kaarina	77
Lohja	75
Kajaani	72
Kotka	71
Seinäjoki	63
Järvenpää	60
Kerava	59
Riihimäki	58
Raisio	51
Kangasala	45
Nurmijärvi	45
Mikkeli	44
Valkeakoski	42
Nokia	40
Vihti	32
Forssa	30
Imatra	30
Karkkila	30
Pirkkala	29
Ylöjärvi	28
Tuusula	27
Laukaa	26
Lempäälä	24
Raseborg	24
Naantali	22
Kemi	20
Korsholm	20
Varkaus	20
Mänttä-Vilppula	18
Pargas	18
Savonlinna	18
Sipoo	18
Ylivieska	18
Kempele	17
Mariehamn	17
Uusikaupunki	17
Raahe	16
Kalajoki	15
Lieto	15
Mäntsälä	14
Heinola	13
Janakkala	13
Hollola	12
Masku	11
Muurame	11
Tornio	11
Akaa	10
Oulainen	10
Nykarleby	10

People with Chinese citizenship living in Finland according to Statistics Finland.

Citizens of China by municipality (2024)
Municipality	Population
Whole country	15,687
Helsinki	3,885
Espoo	3,696
Vantaa	1,201
Tampere	933
Oulu	720
Turku	686
Jyväskylä	418
Lahti	412
Lappeenranta	385
Vaasa	244
Kuopio	227
Rovaniemi	213
Pori	183
Joensuu	173
Porvoo	137
Rauma	135
Hämeenlinna	119
Kokkola	117
Kouvola	104
Salo	82
Kirkkonummi	68
Hyvinkää	67
Kajaani	67
Lohja	64
Kauniainen	62
Kaarina	56
Kerava	51
Riihimäki	50
Kotka	48
Seinäjoki	46
Järvenpää	45
Mikkeli	40
Valkeakoski	38
Kangasala	37
Karkkila	33
Raisio	33
Nokia	31
Nurmijärvi	31
Imatra	30
Forssa	27
Laukaa	24
Mänttä-Vilppula	24
Vihti	24
Ylöjärvi	21
Varkaus	20
Raseborg	19
Kemi	18
Pirkkala	17
Korsholm	16
Naantali	16
Savonlinna	16
Uusikaupunki	16
Kempele	15
Lempäälä	15
Raahe	15
Pargas	14
Heinola	13
Tuusula	13
Ylivieska	13
Kalajoki	12
Tornio	12
Janakkala	10
Lieto	10
Loimaa	10
Oulainen	10

People with Chinese as mother tongue living in Finland according to Statistics Finland.

Chinese speakers by municipality (2024)
Municipality	Population
Whole country	19,264
Helsinki	5,004
Espoo	4,548
Vantaa	1,620
Tampere	1,129
Oulu	821
Turku	807
Lahti	450
Jyväskylä	445
Lappeenranta	399
Vaasa	266
Kuopio	245
Rovaniemi	232
Joensuu	194
Pori	183
Rauma	155
Porvoo	154
Hyvinkää	135
Kokkola	135
Hämeenlinna	129
Kouvola	118
Kirkkonummi	95
Salo	91
Kauniainen	88
Kaarina	78
Kerava	73
Kotka	70
Kajaani	68
Lohja	67
Riihimäki	61
Järvenpää	60
Seinäjoki	52
Nurmijärvi	49
Raisio	49
Mikkeli	48
Nokia	47
Valkeakoski	41
Kangasala	38
Vihti	37
Karkkila	36
Imatra	34
Lempäälä	32
Tuusula	31
Laukaa	29
Forssa	27
Pirkkala	26
Ylöjärvi	26
Mänttä-Vilppula	25
Naantali	21
Raseborg	21
Savonlinna	21
Lieto	20
Varkaus	20
Mariehamn	19
Korsholm	19
Pargas	19
Mäntsälä	17
Raahe	17
Uusikaupunki	17
Ylivieska	17
Heinola	16
Kalajoki	16
Kemi	16
Kempele	15
Tornio	15
Janakkala	13
Hämeenkyrö	11
Loimaa	10
Muurame	10
Oulainen	10

== Notable people ==
- Shirly Karvinen (born 1992), model and beauty pageant titleholder
- Saara Keskitalo (born 2000), athlete
- Ding Ma (born 1988), civil servant and the mayor of Savonlinna
- Sita Salminen (born 1992), writer and YouTuber
- Tao Stark (born 2004), footballer
- Jenny Tian (born 1995), Finnish born Australian comedian
- Kristina Tonteri-Young (born 1998), actress and former ballerina
- Binga Tupamäki (born 1998), politician
- Alfred Wan (1922–2006), military officer
- Guoying Zhao (born 1977), computer scientist
- Nemo Zhou (born 2000), chess player and live streamer

== See also ==
- China–Finland relations
- Chinese people in Sweden
- Anti-Chinese sentiment § Finland
