= Ding Ma =

Finnish civil servant (born 1988)

Mayor of Savonlinna
- Incumbent
- Assumed office 2026–present

Personal details
- Born: 1988 (age 37–38) Suzhou, China
- Citizenship: Finland
- Children: 1
- Education: Aalto University

Ding Ma (Chinese: 马丁; born 1988) is a Finnish politician and civil servant. He has a Master of Science in Economics.

He was born in Suzhou, China, from where his Chinese family moved to Turku, Finland, when he was 4. At the age of six, Ma started school at a Chinese boarding school, from where he returned to Finland at the age of 11 and attended comprehensive school and upper secondary school in Turku. Ma graduated from Aalto University in 2013.

He has been the Director of Vitality in Lappeenranta since 2022, until the Savonlinna's Town Council elected Ma as the Mayor of Savonlinna in 2025. Ma began his current position in March 2026.

Ma is married and they have one child. He holds only Finnish citizenship.
