= China–Sweden relations =

- China: Sweden

Sweden was the first, followed by Denmark, Western country to establish official diplomatic relations with the People's Republic of China, on 9 May 1950.

== History ==
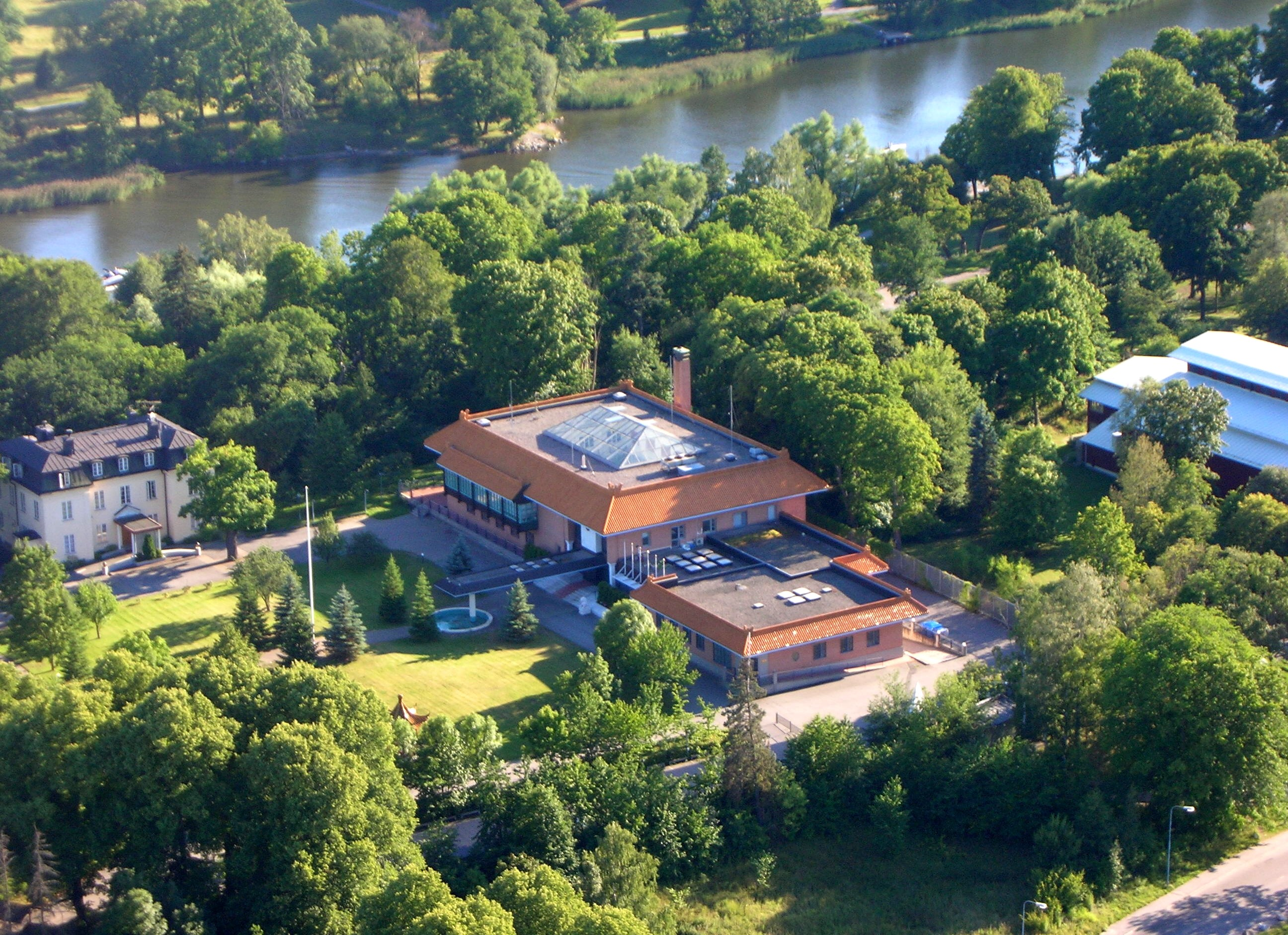
Chinese embassy in Stockholm

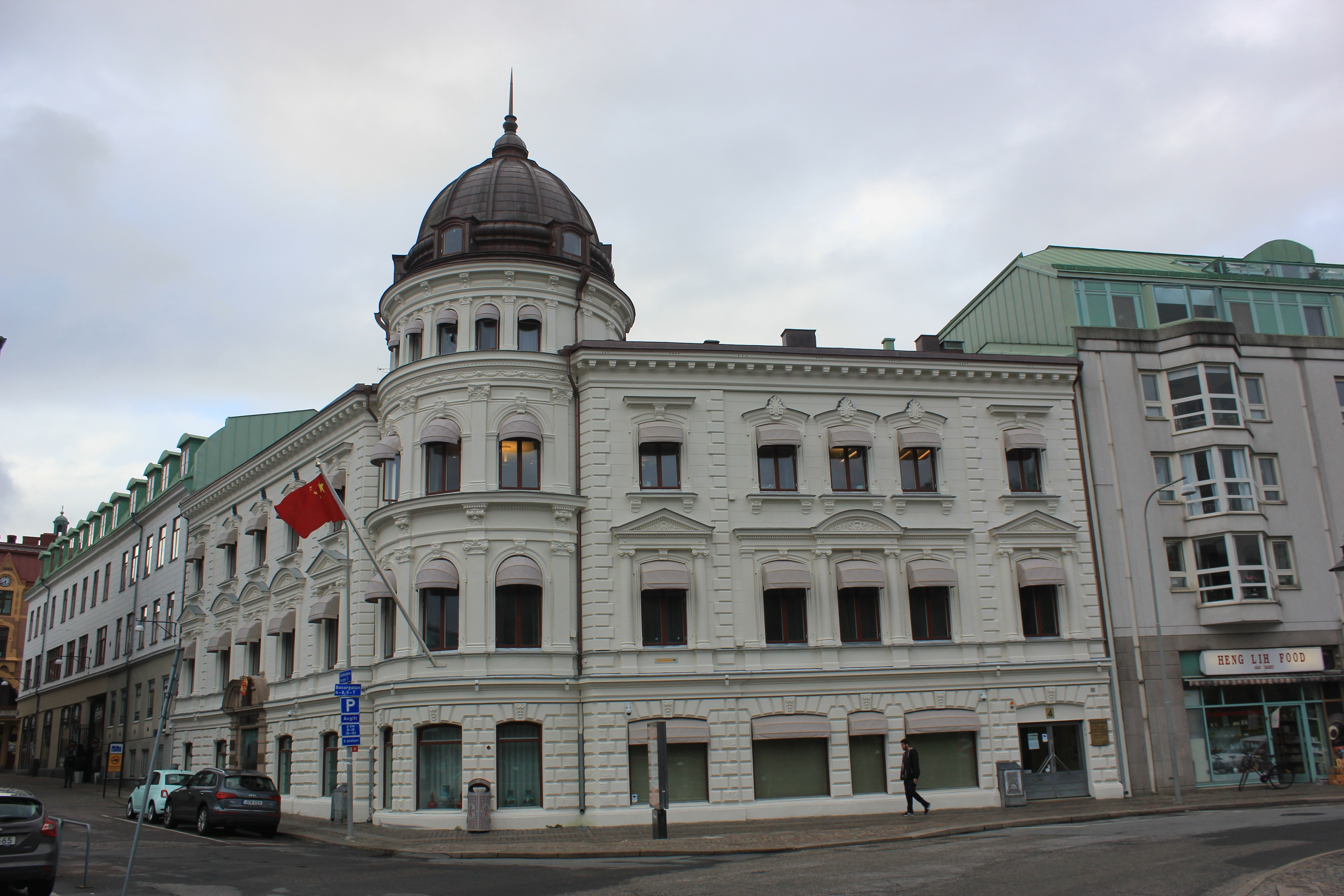
Chinese Consulate-General in Gothenburg

Sweden's and China's ties goes back to the 17th century. Sweden traded with China, and this was recorded by Nils Matsson Kiöping, who visited southern China on the Götheborg in 1654 and wrote accounts of his journeys to China upon his return to Sweden. The Swedish East India Company traded with China from 1731 to 1813.

New research on 1913-1917 post-Qing relations claim that the head of the Swedish Geological Survey, Johan Gunnar Andersson's work was part of Sweden's ‘extractive vision’ which dealt with aiding exploitative interests of Swedish industrial and foreign-policy actors by seeking to secure, for Sweden, a quasi-colonial presence in Republican China, centering on large-scale extraction of Chinese iron ore, profit-maximizing iron exports throughout the Pacific region and construction and operation of China's largest steel mills and weapons factories.

=== 20th century ===
Sweden was the first Western country to establish official diplomatic relations with the People's Republic of China, which took place on 9 May 1950. For this occasion, chairman Mao Zedong decided to personally receive the Swedish ambassador, Torsten Hammarström, as he presented his letter of credentials, which was quite unusual, and a sign that China attached great importance to this diplomatic breakthrough.

=== 2000s ===
A modern replica of the East Indiaman Götheborg was constructed and departed from Gothenburg, Sweden, in 2005. The ship reached Shanghai, China, in 2006. The ship was welcomed in Shanghai by King Carl XVI and Queen Silvia of Sweden who made an official visit to China that year.

=== 2010s ===
The disappearance of five Hong Kong booksellers including notably the extrajudicial rendition of author–publisher Gui Minhai, a Swedish national, from his residence in Thailand in late 2015 would catalyse sharp deterioration in relations. The Chinese government had been silent about holding him in custody for three months, at which point a controversial video confession was broadcast on mainland media. On 5 January 2016, the Minister for Foreign Affairs stated that they took a "serious view" on Gui's disappearance.

On 2 September 2018, a Chinese tourist named Zeng caused a diplomatic incident because he had incorrectly booked a hostel accommodation. Zeng and his elderly parents arrived a day early. They were not allowed to sleep in the lobby overnight, and were forcibly ejected by police when they refused to leave. Zeng accused the Swedish police of having used excess violence. The Chinese Foreign Ministry responded with a security warning on travel to Sweden.

==== Uyghurs ====
In July 2019, British UN Ambassador Karen Pierce delivered a joint international statement on Xinjiang at the United Nations General Assembly's Third Committee on behalf of 23 countries, including Sweden. The countries said they shared concerns raised by the United Nations International Convention on the Elimination of All Forms of Racial Discrimination regarding "credible reports of mass detention; efforts to restrict cultural and religious practices; mass surveillance disproportionately targeting ethnic Uyghurs; and other human rights violations and abuses." They called on China to comply with its national and international obligations to respect human rights, including freedom of religion, and allow UN human rights monitors access to re-education camps.

==== Continued conflict over Gui Minhai ====
In November 2019, Chinese ambassador Gui Congyou threatened Sweden saying that "We treat our friends with fine wine, but for our enemies we use shotguns." over the decision by Swedish PEN to award Gui Minhai the Tucholsky Prize. All eight major Swedish political parties condemned the ambassador's threats. On 4 December, after the prize had been awarded, Ambassador Gui said that one could not both harm China's interests and benefit economically from China; when asked to clarify his remarks he said that China would impose trade restrictions on Sweden. These remarks were backed up by the Chinese Foreign Ministry in Beijing.

The Swedish Ambassador to China, Anna Lindstedt, was recalled for arranging a meeting between the daughter of Gui Minhai and two businessmen representing Beijing without the approval or knowledge of the Swedish Foreign Ministry and indicted for unauthorised contacts with a foreign power.

=== 2020s ===
In January 2020, the Chinese Embassy announced that they would be denying Chinese visas to reporters who criticize China or, as they put it, damage the relationship between China and Sweden. The Ambassador called Sweden's press "lightweight" and said they should not have picked a fight with China who is a "heavyweight" and will now retaliate.

In February 2020, Sweden's foreign ministry summoned China's ambassador to demand the release of Gui Minhai, a day after he was sentenced to 10 years in jail on charges of illegally providing intelligence to foreigners.

In 2020, amid the straining of the relations between both countries, Sweden shut down the last of the Confucius teaching programmes in the country. Cities such as Gothenburg, Linköping, Luleå and Västerås have not extended long-standing twinning or partnership agreements with Chinese cities – Shanghai, Guangzhou, Xian and Jinan respectively. The agreement has been renewed continuously but officially expired at the end of 2019.

In June 2020, Sweden openly opposed the Hong Kong national security law. In 2024, the Jamestown Foundation reported that over 100 organizations of the Chinese Communist Party's united front were in operation in Sweden, including a center dedicated to technology transfer as well as cultural, educational, professional, and political groups. In April 2024, Sweden deported a Chinese united front activist on national security grounds. In November 2024, Swedish police opened an investigation into a Chinese shipping vessel, the Yi Peng 3, in the Baltic Sea after it was found be in the vicinity of two severed undersea fiber-optic data cables and suspected of sabotage. China's Ministry of Foreign Affairs refused to permit Swedish prosecutors to board the vessel.

In March 2026, Sweden's Security Service (SAPO) identified China as one of the country's three main security threats alongside Iran and Russia. In July 2026, the government of Sweden announced that critical metals and rare-earth minerals would be treated as a national security interest as part of an effort to counter dependence on China.

== Trade relations ==
In 2006, the trade value between the two countries added up to $6.73 billion. As of 2016 Sweden had become China's ninth-largest trading partner in the European Union and China had been Sweden's largest trade partner in Asia for four consecutive years.

== Public opinion ==
A survey published in 2026 by the Pew Research Center found that 71% of Swedes had an unfavorable view of China, while 27% had a favorable view. It also found that 37% of the people in the 18-35 age group had positive opinions of China.

== See also ==
- Foreign relations of China
- Foreign relations of Sweden
- Foreign policy
- Ambassador of China to Sweden
- Swedish School Beijing
- China–European Union relations
- Chinese people in Sweden
