= Guoying Zhao =

Computer scientist

Guoying Zhao is a Chinese and Finnish computer scientist specializing in computer vision and affective computing. She is an Academy Professor of the Research Council of Finland and the Center for Machine Vision and Signal Analysis of the University of Oulu in Finland.

== Education and career ==
Zhao received a Ph.D. in 2005 through the Chinese Academy of Sciences. She came to Finland in 2005 to become a researcher at the Center for Machine Vision and Signal Analysis at the University of Oulu.

Her work there was supported from 2008 to 2011 through a postdoctoral research fellowship of the Academy of Finland (now the Research Council of Finland), and she became a researcher for the academy in 2011. She became a tenure-track associate professor at the University of Oulu in 2014, concurrent with her position with the academy. In 2017 she became full professor, and in 2021 was named Academy Professor.

== Recognition ==
Zhao was named as a Fellow of the International Association for Pattern Recognition (IAPR) in 2020, "for contributions to video analysis and affective computing", and as an IEEE Fellow in 2022, "for contributions to facial expression analysis and feature representation". She became a member of the Finnish Academy of Science and Letters in 2022, and was elected to Academia Europaea in 2023.

She was the 2024 recipient of the Maria Petrou Prize of the IAPR, given to her in recognition of her "contributions to video analysis for facial micro-behavior recognition and remote bio-signal reading (RPPG) for heart rate analysis and face anti-spoofing".
