= Swedish School Beijing =

Swedish international school in Beijing, China

- Swedish: Svenska skolan i Peking; Chinese: 瑞典学校

Information
- Established: 1994
- Closed: 2015
- Website: Archive

Swedish School Beijing (SSB; Swedish: Svenska skolan i Peking, simplified Chinese: 瑞典学校; traditional Chinese: 瑞典學校; pinyin: Ruìdiǎn Xuéxiào) was a Swedish international school in Gahood Villa (嘉浩别墅), Shunyi District, Beijing. As of 2012, Maria Hedelin-Björse was its headmistress. The school served students aged 2–12 and followed the Swedish curriculum, but was staffed by Chinese employees. Students from all Scandinavian countries were eligible to attend.

== History ==
The school was established in 1994. However, on 3 March 2015, the school council made the decision to close it due to declining enrollment. Parents were informed of this decision on 4 March. The school's last semester concluded on 6 June 2015, coinciding with Sweden's National Day, and officially shut its doors on 30 June.

== See also ==
- Swedish School in Moscow
- China–Sweden relations
