= Tao Stark =

Finnish footballer (born 2004)

Personal information
- Date of birth: 1 August 2004 (age 22)
- Place of birth: Finland
- Position: Midfielder

Team information
- Current team: Glasgow City

Youth career
- JyPK

Senior career*
Years	Team	Apps	(Gls)
2021–2023	JyPK	35	(4)
2024–2025	KuPS	42	(4)
2025–	Glasgow City	0	(0)

International career
2025–	Finland		
- * Club domestic league appearances and goals

Tao Stark
- Simplified Chinese: 陶·史塔克
Transcriptions
Standard Mandarin
- Hanyu Pinyin: Táo shǐ tǎ kè
- IPA: [tʰɑʊ̯³⁵ ʂɨ˨˩˦ tʰa˨˩˦ kʰɤ̂]

Tao Stark (Chinese: 陶史塔克, pronounced [tʰɑʊ̯³⁵ ʂɨ˨˩˦ tʰa˨˩˦ kʰɤ̂]; born 1 August 2004) is a Finnish professional footballer who plays as a midfielder for Glasgow City.

== Early life ==
Stark was born on 1 August 2004 in Finland. Nicknamed "Tauski", she is of Chinese descent through her parents.

== Club career ==
As a youth player, Stark joined the youth academy of Finnish side JyPK and was promoted to the club's senior team in 2021, where she made thirty-five league appearances and scored four goals.

Following her stint there, she signed for Finnish side KuPS ahead of the 2024 season, where she made forty-two league appearances. Subsequently, she signed for Scottish side Glasgow City.

== International career ==
Stark is a Finland youth international. During February 2025, she was first called up to the Finland women's national football team.
