= Carl Grimberg =

Swedish historian (1875–1941)

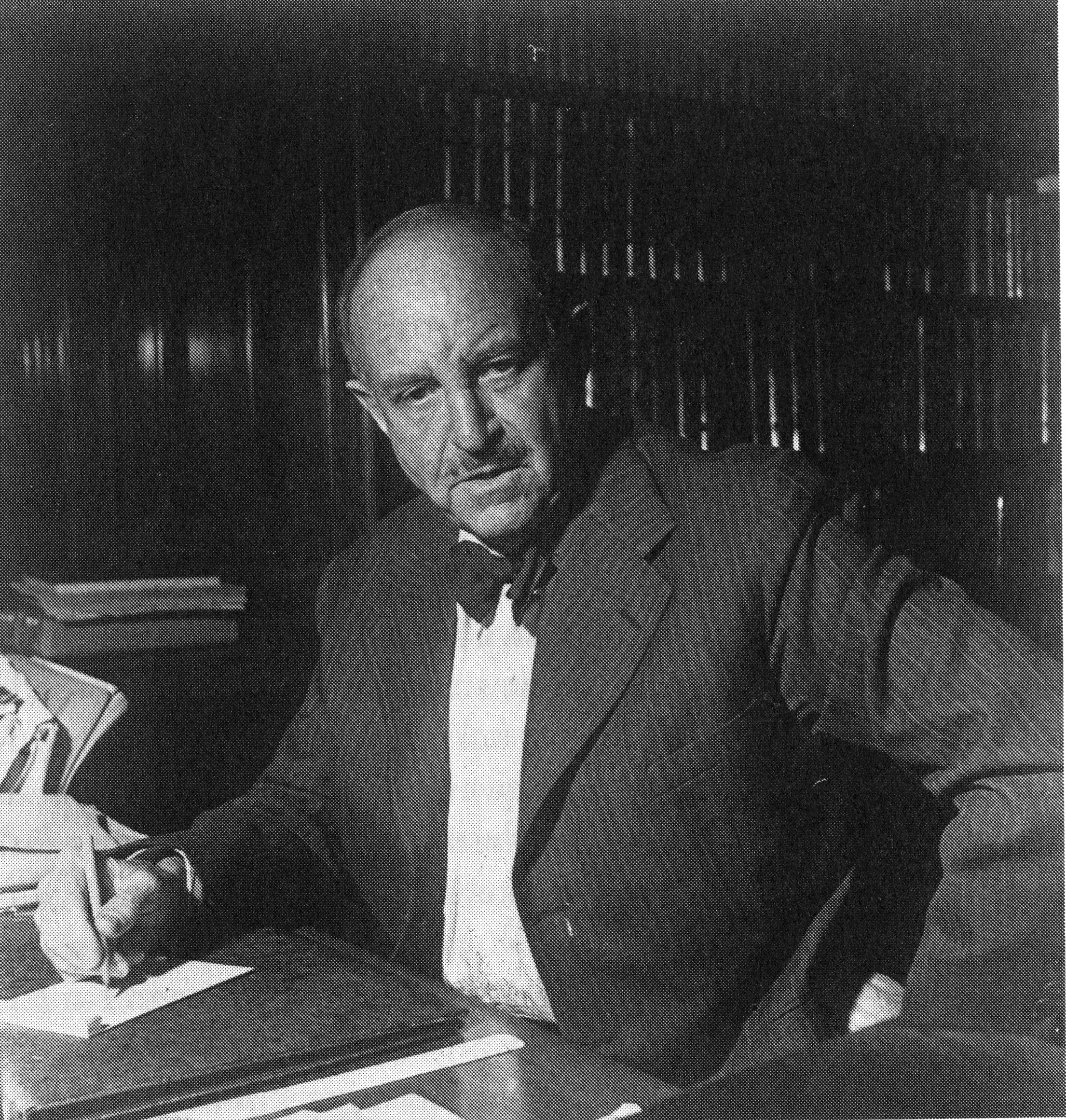
Carl Grimberg.

Carl Gustaf Grimberg (22 September 1875 in Gothenburg, Sweden – 11 June 1941 in Djursholm) was a Swedish historian.

His parents were Joel Grimberg and Charlotta (née Andersson); in 1919, he married Eva Carlsdotter Sparre (1895–1982).

Grimberg completed his PhD in 1903 and then took a teaching job. In 1905 he began to write a school textbook, focussing on the history of Sweden and its diplomatic relations with Prussia, Denmark and other countries. In 1908 he left his teaching job to concentrate fully on his writing.

== Swedish history ==
Grimberg is best known in his homeland for his history of Sweden, The Wonderful Destiny of the Swedish People (Svenska folkets underbara öden) (1913–1924).

== World history ==
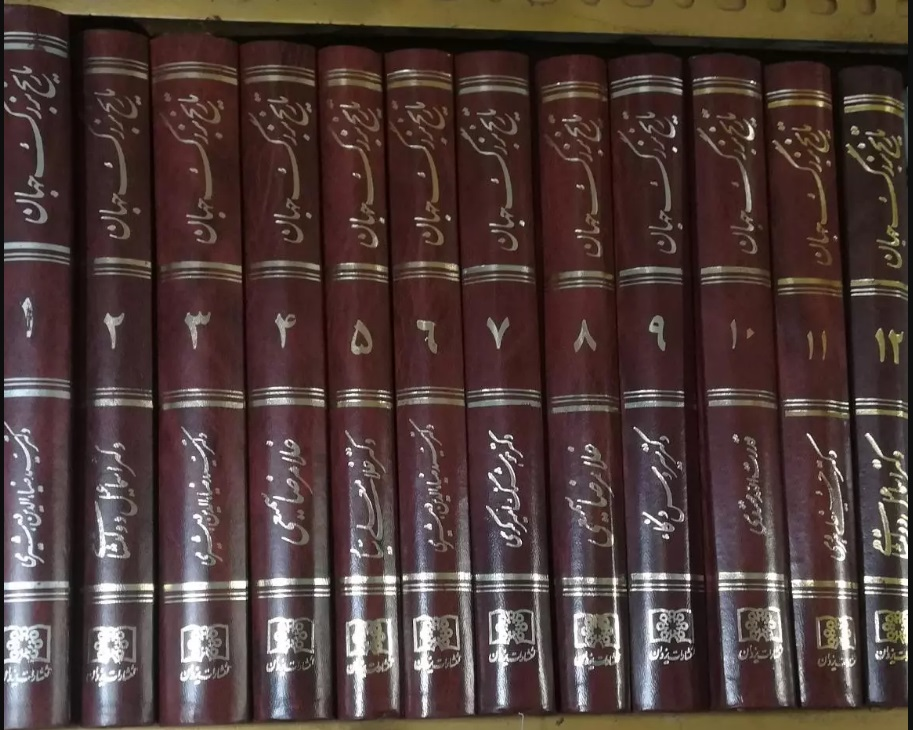
Grimberg's Världshistoria in Persian translation.

Grimberg's European reputation rests primarily on his World History (Världshistoria. Folkens liv och kultur), of which he published the first volume in 1926. Despite its title, the work focused on Europe and the Mediterranean basin, with only incidental coverage of other regions in the context of European imperialism. Grimberg published ten volumes between 1926 and 1941, taking the story from ancient Egypt to the beginning of the eighteenth century. The eleventh volume, left unfinished at his death, was completed by his assistant Ragnar Svanström and published in 1945. Svanström wrote or co-wrote three more volumes between 1951 and 1958, taking the story up to the end of World War II.

The work was widely translated, both into Scandinavian languages (Danish, Finnish, Norwegian) and further afield (Dutch, French, German, Italian, Persian). Translations do not necessarily follow the Swedish volume divisions. Some publishers continued to update and augment their versions of "Grimberg" into the 1970s. While these publications helped to keep Grimberg's name alive, their connection to the original work was increasingly tenuous.
