= Social Security Board =

Social Security Board may refer to:

- Social Security Board (Belize)
- Social Security Board (Myanmar)
- Social Security Board (United States), FDR New Deal program, now the Social Security Administration
