= Sweden–Taiwan relations =

- Sweden: Taiwan

Sweden and Taiwan do not currently have formal diplomatic relations. However, they engage in unofficial exchanges and trade.

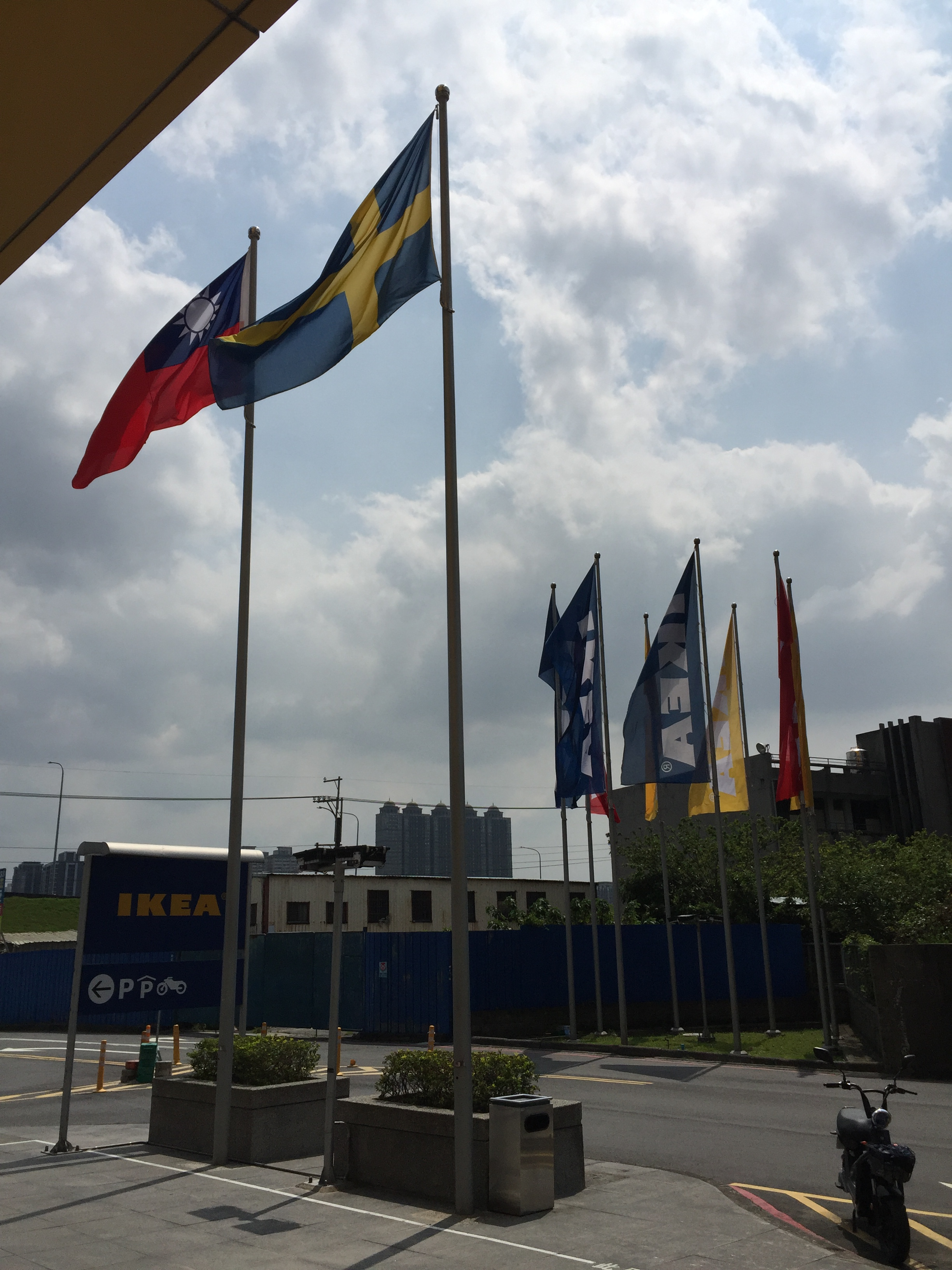
Swedish and Taiwanese Flags

== History ==
Sweden–Taiwan relations strengthened following Taiwan's democratization and the end of authoritarian rule.

In April 2022, a delegation of Swedish parliamentarians visited Taiwan. Swedish Prime Minister Ulf Kristersson expressed concerns about the threat posed to Taiwan by China in his first parliamentary address.

In February 2023, the Taiwan-Four Nordic Countries Parliamentary Friendship Association was stood up to coordinate parliamentary relations between Taiwan and the Nordic countries of Denmark, Finland, Norway and Sweden. In May 2023, a delegation of Swedish parliamentarians including Markus Wiechel, Sara Gille, Nima Gholam Ali Pour, and Rasmus Giertz visited Taiwan. While in Taiwan Wiechel called for greater participation in international organizations for Taiwan saying "The fact that Taiwan is excluded from a number of international organizations -- and this despite the fact that most of the free world considers Taiwan a significant international player in trade, diplomacy and democracy -- is of course completely unacceptable."

In August 2024, a cross-party delegation of Swedish parliamentarians led by Lotta Johnsson Fornarve visited Taiwan to deepen understanding about its democratization process and the situation in the Taiwan Strait. In November 2024, a Taiwanese delegation led by Shen You-chung arrived at the Swedish Riksdag to discuss Taiwan's international participation.

The Taiwan Friendship Group is one of the largest groups in the Swedish Riksdag. In January 2026, Sweden and Taiwan agreed to enhance their technology cooperation.

== Trade ==
Sweden is Taiwan's largest trade partner in northern Europe. As of 2021, two-way trade totaled US$1.59 billion, and Swedish investment in Taiwan totaled US$578 million (September 2021).

== Representation ==
The Swedish Trade and Invest Council represents Swedish interests in Taiwan. Swedish lawmakers have proposed renaming it to "House of Sweden."

The Taipei Mission in Sweden represents Taiwanese interests in Sweden.

== See also ==
- Foreign relations of Sweden
- Foreign relations of Taiwan
