= Sexual violence in Finland =

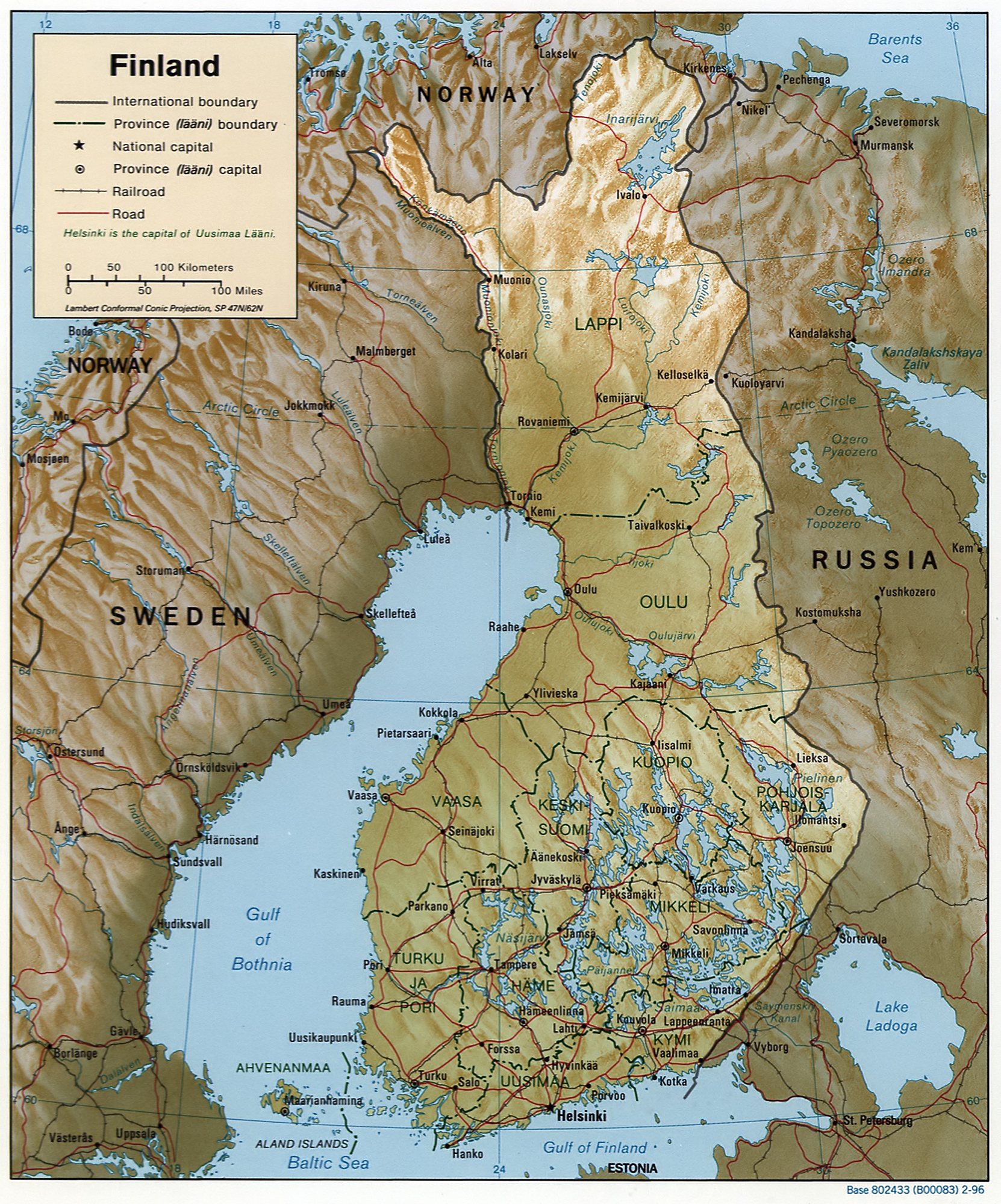
A map of Finland

Sexual violence means that someone forces or manipulates someone else into unwanted sexual activity without their consent. Such violence can take place in both heterosexual and homosexual relationships, as well as outside intimate relationships. All sexual offenses violate the basic right of sexual self-determination. In Finland, sexual violence and taking advantage of a person is always a crime, even if the assaulter was the victim's spouse, relative or friend. Sexual offences include but are not limited to rape, forcing someone into a sexual act and taking sexual advantage of a person.

== Statistics ==
=== Prevalence ===
Estimating the prevalence of sexual violence in Finland is difficult, because a considerable number of assaults go unreported to the police. The several different estimates for the number of rapes occurring in Finland each year are based on research on the victims of the assaults, calls and contacts the Rape Crisis Center Tukinainen has received, and also on police estimates. For example, according to the Rape Crisis Center, they receive 1000–1200 calls and attempted calls each month. People have become more likely to report an assault to the police in recent years. In 2000, there were 579 cases of rape and 504 cases of sexual assault of a child reported. These numbers have increased significantly since then, and in 2018, there were 1393 cases of rape and 1373 cases of sexual exploitation of a child reported. Younger people are at increased risk of violent victimization. The risk of physical assault is highest between the ages of 15 and 34 years.

The Nordic countries are often praised for their achievements on gender equality, but according to a 2012 study by the European Union Agency for Fundamental Rights (FRA), 47 percent of women in Finland have experienced physical or sexual violence from anyone at some point since the age of 15. Out of the 28 European Union countries that were studied in the survey, only Danish women were found to have experienced more. However National Finnish studies and questionnaires performed by Kansallinen rikosuhritutkimus (National Crime Survey) have found numbers only close to one eighth of that. The FRA study included being grabbed or shoved by anyone as violence in the results of the questionnaire. (Note: Box 2.1: What the survey asked – physical and sexual violence Physical violence Since you were 15 years old until now/in the past 12 months, how often has someone: • Pushed you or shoved you? • Slapped you? • Thrown a hard object at you? • Grabbed you or pulled your hair? • Beaten you with a fist or a hard object, or kicked you? • Burned you? • Tried to suffocate you or strangle you? • Cut or stabbed you, or shot at you? • Beaten your head against something? Sexual violence Since you were 15 years old until now/in the past 12 months, how often has someone: • Forced you into sexual intercourse by holding you down or hurting you in some way? [IF NEEDED: By sexual intercourse we mean here forced oral sex, forced anal or vaginal penetration.] • Apart from this, attempted to force you into sexual intercourse by holding you down or hurting you in some way? [IF NEEDED: By sexual intercourse we mean here forced oral sex, forced anal or vaginal penetration.] • Apart from this, made you take part in any form of sexual activity when you did not want to or you were unable to refuse? • Or have you consented to sexual activity because you were afraid of what might happen if you refused? The questions on physical and sexual violence were asked separately regarding the current partner, previous partner and other persons.) In the study, 11 percent of Finnish women said to have experienced sexual violence by a non-partner, while the EU average for sexual violence by a non-partner is 6 percent. Furthermore, 11 percent of Finnish women said that they have experienced sexual violence by an intimate partner. This statistic is also higher than the EU average, which is 7 percent. According to a 1998 study by Markku Heiskanen and Minna Piispa one woman in five had at least experienced physical violence once by their present partner. One-half of those who had been victims of intimate partner violence had suffered some kind of physical injury from the assault, against one-third of those who had experienced non-partner violence. Over one out of four women who had lived in a violent couple relationship had sought help from a shelter, the police, a lawyer's or a legal aid office or other institutions. The violence experienced by the women generally occurred in couple relationships. This study was carried out by taking a systematic sample of 7100 Finnish and Swedish-speaking women aged 18- to 74-year-olds from the Central Population Register. The Women Peace and Security Index ranks Finland as the fourth safest country for women out of 177, with Denmark as 1st.

=== Report and conviction rates ===
According to the Central Statistical Office of Finland, in 1998 and before the 1999 law reform on sexual offenses (1994–1998), police were able to solve on average 55 percent of the cases reported to them, and in less than 10 percent of the rape cases, the process led to a conviction. After the reform, the processing of rapes and other sexual assaults has become more efficient. More cases have been reported, and the police have been better able to solve them, increasing the number of convicted assaulters and therefore bringing the percentage of solved cases up to 64 percent in 2003, which is about 367 cases. Even at this increased rate of reporting, Amnesty International says that fewer than 10 per cent of rapes are estimated to be reported to the police in Finland.

The rate at which charges are pressed after a rape varies depending on the type of assault. When a rape is done by stranger, only 8 percent of charges are pressed, because often the identity of the perpetrator can never be solved. In the case of rapes that takes place when the perpetrator and the victims have just met each other or already know each other, the victim presses charges for 19 percent of the cases. However, in these cases, the process often stops because the police cannot solve the crime, the case ends up being classified as not fulfilling the characteristics of a rape, or the victim requests that the charges be dropped. In a significant number of cases, a sufficient amount of evidence for a conviction is not available to the police.

The Central Statistical Office also states that prior to 1999, police did not report about a third of all rape cases to the prosecutor. After the reform, this number has decreased to one tenth of all cases that come to the attention of the police. In 2003, 337 cases were reported to the prosecutor, which is about 92 percent of solved rapes. In their briefing published in March 2012, the Finnish Department of Justice stated that with the reform that took place in 2011 (the characteristics of rape were expanded so that now sexual interaction with anyone who can be considered defenseless is in all circumstances a rape) it is expected that the number of cases where the accused is convicted of a rape will increase considerably.

The sentences of the convicted have been getting longer: on the latter half of 1990, the sentences got longer by about half a year, and even in the last decade there has been a slight increase in the sentences given to convicted sexual offenders. This harshening of the sentences has a connection to the revision that was done to the law on sexual offenses in 1999.

In 2008, the average time of the judicial process from the date the rape happened to the date of the conviction is 1.5 years.

== Law ==
=== From January 2023 ===
The Ministry of Justice in Finland enacted new legislation on sexual offences effective from January 2023, prioritizing sexual self-determination and personal integrity. Under the reform, the definition of rape has been revised to emphasize the necessity of voluntary participation in sexual intercourse. The legislation also expands the scope of sexual harassment to include acts beyond physical touching and introduces penalties for the non-consensual dissemination of sexual images. Furthermore, the reform enhances protection for children's integrity and imposes stricter penalties for offences against them. These changes aim to combat various forms of sexual abuse, including online harassment.

The new legislation on sexual offences strengthens the legal framework in the following areas:

- Definition of rape
- Definition of sexual assault
- Definition of sexual harassment
- Non-consensual dissemination of a sexual image
- Sexual offences against children

=== Prior to January 2023 ===
The guidelines for sexual offenses was revised with a law that came into effect 1. January 1999. With this revision, sexual offenses were divided into three levels of graveness based on how severe the act is. The three levels are rape, aggravated rape and forcing someone to a sexual act. The revision also affects the cause of action.

The sections below are translated from the Finnish Penal Code.

==== Rape 1 § (27.6.2014/509) ====
If a person forces someone into sexual intercourse by using violence or threat of violence, the person is to be convicted for rape. The convicted should receive a jail sentence of at least one and at most six years. It is also considered rape if the assaulter takes advantage of the victim being unconscious, sick, disabled, in a state of fear or if the victim is in any other way considered unable to defend themselves or to express their consent or the lack of consent. If some of the factors above are lacking evidence, the accused should be sentenced to at least four months or at most four years in prison.

Attempted rape is also punishable.

==== Aggravated rape 2 § (27.6.2014/509) ====
A rape is considered aggravated if:

- serious physical injury, serious illness or a life-threatening state occurs
- the crime is committed by multiple people, or in especially considerable mental or physical suffering results from the crime
- the victim is 18 years old or younger
- the crime is committed in a way that is particularly brutal, harsh, or humiliating
- if a firearm, an edged weapon or another life-threatening device is used, or
- if the victim is threatened with severe violence

If the rape is aggravated when judged comprehensively, the accused should be convicted for aggravated rape and sentenced to a minimum of two years and a maximum of ten years in prison.

An attempted aggravated rape is also punishable.

==== Coercing someone into a sexual act 4 § (24.7.1998/563) ====
If the accused forced the victim into an act other than those stated in 1 § by using violence or the threat of it, or if the accused forced the victim to submit to any of these acts, it clearly violates the victim's right of sexual self-determination and the accused should be convicted for forcing someone into a sexual act and sentenced with either a fine or jail time for up to three years.

An accused should also be sentenced if the assaulter takes advantage of the victim being unconscious, sick, disabled, in a state of fear or if the victim is in any other way considered unable to defend themselves or to express their consent or the lack of consent, and gets the victim to do an act described in the paragraph above or if the accused forced the victim into submitting to one of these acts, therefore considerably violating the victim's right of self-determination. (13.5.2011/495)

An attempt is also punishable.

==== Sexual abuse 5 § (24.7.1998/563) ====
A person can be convicted if he/she takes advantage of their situation or relation to the victim to coerce them to sexual interaction or to another act that considerably violates the victim's right of sexual self-determination, or if the victim is coerced so submit to a similar act that violates sexual self-determination, when:

- the victim is younger than 18 years, and is in school or at another institution where he/she is under the assaulter's authority or supervision, or in another situation similar to these where the perpetrator is clearly in a position that makes him/her superior
- the victim is younger than 18 years, and their ability to independently make decisions about their sexual behavior is considerably weaker than that of the perpetrator because of the victim's level of maturity and the possible age difference between the perpetrator and the victim, with the perpetrator clearly taking advantage of the victim's immaturity
- the victim is being treated in a hospital or another institution, and their ability to defend themselves and form or voice an opinion is limited because of illness, disability or another state of inability, or (27.6.2014/509)
- the victim is particularly dependent on the perpetrator, who gravely takes advantage of this dependency

Should be convicted for taking sexual advantage and sentenced to fines or up to four years in prison.

==== Sexual abuse of a child 6 § (20.5.2011/540) ====
A person can be convicted for sexual abuse of a child, if they touched or in another way commit a sexual act that is likely to cause harm to a child's development or get the child to commit a similar sexual act. Anyone who is under 16 years old is considered a child. If convicted, the perpetrator should be sentenced to a minimum of four months and maximum of four years in jail.

Anyone who has sexual intercourse with a child younger than 16 years should also be convicted, if the crime is over all not aggravated by the reasoning stated in 7 §'s first paragraph. In addition, a person should be convicted for taking sexual advantage of a child if what is stated above occurs with a child who is 16 but not yet 18 and the perpetrator is the victim's parent or in a similar relationship with the child and lives in the same household.

An attempt is also punishable.

==== Aggravated sexual abuse of a child 7 § (20.5.2011/540) ====
Applicable, if

- the perpetrator has sexual intercourse with a child younger than 16 or with a child who is 16 but not yet 18 and the perpetrator is the victim's parent or in a similar relationship with the child and lives in the same household
- In sexual abuse of a child
  - the victim is a child to whose development the crime is likely to cause severe harm because of the child's age or level of development
  - the crime is committed in a way that is particularly humiliating
  - the crime is likely to cause severe harm to the child because of the trust the child has for the perpetrator or because of the child's dependency of the perpetrator

Also if the crime as a whole is aggravated, the perpetrator should be convicted for aggravated sexual abuse of a child and sentenced to a minimum of one year and a maximum of ten years in prison.

An attempt is also punishable.

==== Definitions 10 § (27.6.2014/509) ====
The legal terms used in these statutes are defined as:

- "Sexual Intercourse" means inserting one's sexual organ into the victim's sexual organ or anal aperture, or taking the other person's sexual organ into your body.
- "Sexual Act" means an act, that is sexually relevant considering the perpetrator, the victim and the circumstances of the act.

== Victims ==
=== Women ===
The majority of cases of sexual violence is against women. Some groups within society have a greater possibility of becoming a victim of sexual violence, and sexual violence often has different kinds of impact of the lives of the victims from different backgrounds (age and social status also have an effect). However, according to a cross-cultural comparison between three regions in Finland, Denmark, Russia, Estonia and the US in 1988 "Scandinavian workers reported fewer women-unfriendly experiences than the women in the other countries did. According to the researchers this was an effect of the gender equality policy in Scandinavia."

=== Children ===
Of children who have experienced sexual abuse in Finland (2013), 87.4 percent were girls and 12.6 percent were boys. It is estimated that nine girls and three boys out of 100 are victims of penetrative sexual abuse and 8–31% of girls and 3–17% of boys are exposed to a form of sexual abuse in Europe.

=== Men ===
Most often in the cases of violence where men are the victims, the violence is committed by a stranger (42%). This violence is dominantly physical or threats of violence: sexual violence against men is rare. Although the risk of becoming a victim of violence committed by strangers is rather high for men, they are not worried about becoming victims of violence when walking alone in their area after dark: less than five percent of men said they felt unsafe. A study conducted by Markku Heiskanen and Elina Ruuskanen states that the most common form of sexual harassment experienced by men was indecent passes, touching or attempts to be kissed against one's will and that 14 percent of the men had such experiences after their 15th birthday, and almost 5 per cent in the last 12 months. However, according to Berdahl et al. (1996) in a considerable number of cases of what women would call sexual harassment, men do not consider the act as unwelcome or threatening, and that the consequences are not as damaging for men as they are for women.

=== Others ===
Different documents (for example the Beijing Declaration and Platform for Action) have stated that women of ethnic and cultural minorities are more likely to become victims of sexual violence. Other factors that are likely to effect the probability of getting sexually offended are social status, possible drug usage, belonging to a sexual or gender minority or being disabled as well as if the person is a victim of human trafficking. The aforementioned characteristics are also likely to decrease the probability of getting and searching for help if a person does become a victim of a crime of sexual offense.

There has been no sufficient research done on sexual and gender minorities, but a study done in the beginning of 1980 (by Grönfors et al.) about experiences of violence by gay and bisexual persons states that every sixth gay or bisexual male had experienced violence because of their sexual orientation. The corresponding number for lesbian and bisexual women was significantly less.

The risk for immigrants to be sexually offended is almost double compared to that of native Finns, even though 92 percent of the victims of sexual offenses were native Finns. Five percent of the victims are immigrants from elsewhere in Europe, while immigrants with African origins form two percent of the offended. With respect to the native Finns, immigrants from Africa have seven times as high risk to be sexually offended and the immigrants with Vietnamese origins have a risk five times as high as that of natives. Some of this difference in the possibility of being sexually offended is explained by the differences in the age structures of the groups.

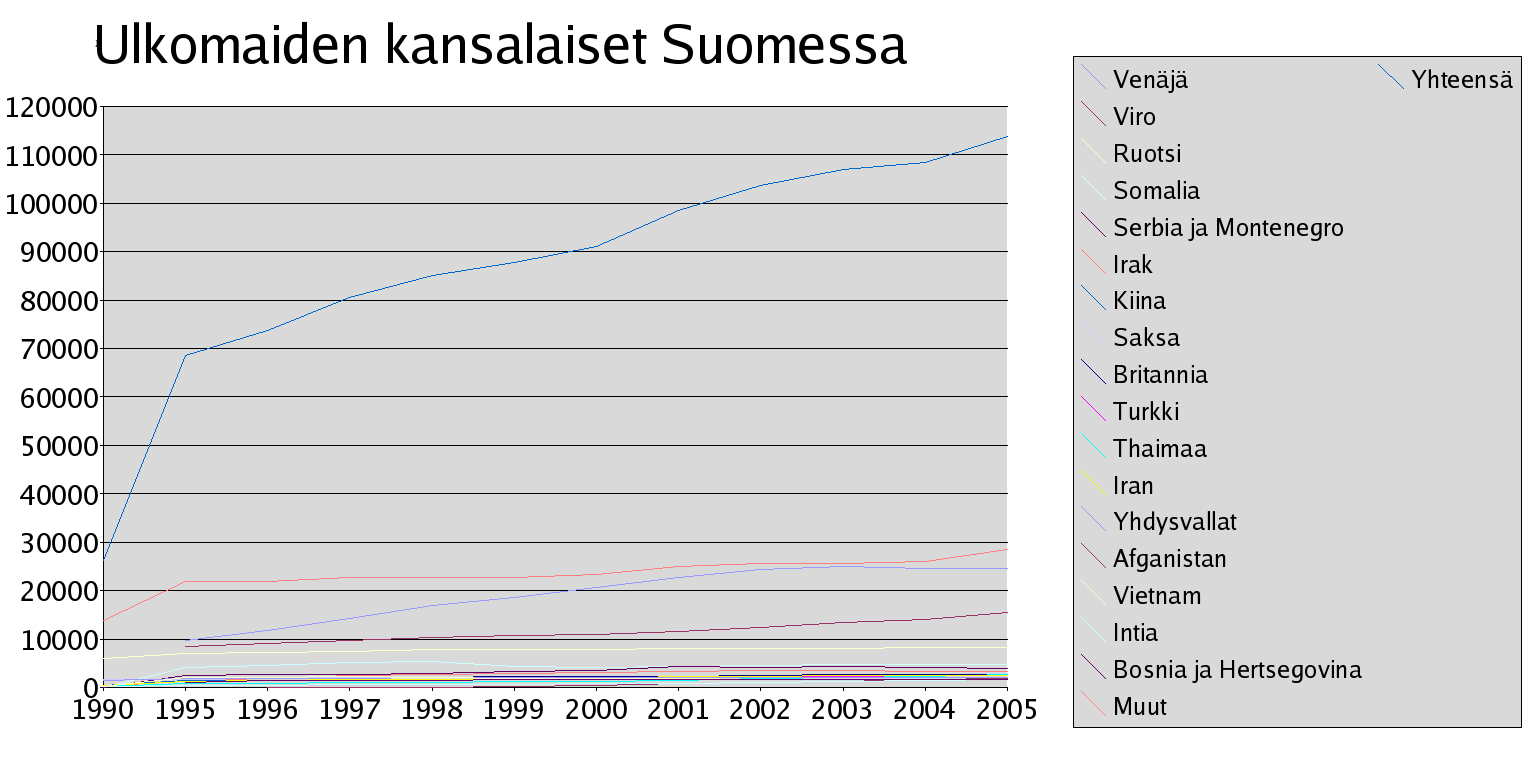
Foreigners in Finland 1990–2005. The blue line at the top represents the total number of foreigners, and the other lines represent the number of foreigners in Finland by country.

== Perpetrators ==
Sexual offences per nationality in 2017
| Origin | Per 10 000 |
| Afghanistan | 138.12 |
| Iraq | 133.86 |
| Syria | 41.59 |
| Turkey | 40.78 |
| Sweden | 28.69 |
| Somalia | 28.46 |
| Russia | 6.51 |
| Estonia | 5.43 |
| Finland | 3.33 |
Source: Police of Finland statistics

Of the cases reported to the police, the assaulter and the assaulted normally know each other and only in one in every four reported cases is the assaulter a stranger. In almost all the cases, the suspected perpetrator is a male. In the harassment experienced by men, the perpetrator was usually the same age as the harassed, while in the cases of harassment experienced by women, the perpetrator was normally around the same age or older than the victim.

According to a study done by Martti Lehti et al. (2014), 28 percent of the suspects for crimes associated with rape were first generation immigrants while second generation immigrants formed a little less than 1 percent. The number of crimes per immigrant who lives in Finland is almost eight times as high as that of native Finns when looking at rape related crimes. It was also stated that the immigrants originating from Africa and Middle East commit the highest levels of crimes, with the level being seventeen times as high as that of native Finns. The offenses committed by the immigrant groups most often target the natives of the area.

Most cases of any kind crimes related with violence are overwhelmingly related to alcohol with 60 percent of violent crimes being committed while under the influence of alcohol and with about 86 percent of incest abuse cases occurring when the abuser was intoxicated.

== Prevention ==
=== Restraining order ===
A restraining order is a means to protect the life, health, freedom or peace of a person, and prevents another person from contacting him/her. The purpose of this is to prevent crimes, to improve the possibilities, and to interfere with severe harassment and other possible offenses.

The Finnish law on restraining order states, that "a restraining order may be imposed only if there are reasonable grounds to assume that the person against whom the order is applied for is likely to commit an offense against the life, health, liberty or privacy of the person who feels threatened or in some other way severely harass this person." However, "if the person who feels threatened and the person against whom the restraining order is applied for live permanently in the same residence, a restraining order may be imposed to prevent an offense against life, health or liberty or a threat of such an offense (inside-the-family restraining order). (30.7.2004/711)"

=== The Programme of Reducing Violence on Women ===
The action plan was prepared in cooperation between the Ministry of the Interior, the Ministry of Justice, the Ministry of Social Affairs and Health and the Ministry for Foreign Affairs, and the drafting was coordinated by the National Institute for Health and Welfare, as commissioned by the Ministry of Social Affairs and Health. The Ministerial Working Group on Internal Security adopted the action plan in June 2010 to reduce the violence on women, and the goal of this plan is to proactively reduce violence by influencing attitudes and the ways people behave, improve the position of victims of sexual violence and the crisis assistance and support provided to them since it is recognized that these resources are in need of significant improvements.

There are three main principles to this plan. The first one is to prevent violence by developing ways in which sexual violence could be more easily detected and interfered with and by improving the level on which the authorities are aware of sexual offences. The second principle is to protect the victims and to provide support for them by training authorities to be more sensitive when interacting with a victim of a sexual assault, which would in turn make the process easier on the victim as well as increase the probability that the case will be solved since the victim is more likely to feel like he/she is being taken seriously when his/her case is handled with a symphatetic attitude. The plan also aims to improve the already existing support systems. The last of the main principles is to bring the perpetrators to justice for their acts by improving the process of investigation more effective. This is to be achieved by revising the laws that handle sexual offences.

== See also ==
- Oulu child sexual exploitation scandal
- Corrective rape
- Estimates of sexual violence
- Human Rights
- Rape statistics
- Sexual violence in the Democratic Republic of the Congo
- Sexual violence in South Africa
