= Señorita =

Señorita or Senorita may refer to:

== Biology ==
- Señorita banana, a banana cultivar from the Philippines
- Oxyjulis (Spanish common name: señorita), a species of fish

== Film ==
- Senorita (film), a 1927 American silent film
- Señorita, a 2011 film by Isabel Sandoval

== Music ==
- Señorita EP, by Superdrag, or the title song, 1999
- Senorita, an album by Suneeta Rao, 1987
- "Señorita" (Abraham Mateo song), 2012
- "Señorita" (Don Williams song), 1987
- "Senorita" ((G)I-dle song), 2019
- "Señorita" (Justin Timberlake song), 2003
- "Señorita" (Shawn Mendes and Camila Cabello song), 2019
- "Señorita" (Zindagi Na Milegi Dobara song), 2011
- "Señorita", a song by Amine, 2015
- "Señorita", a song by Christophe, 1984
- "Señorita", a song by Duki from Súper Sangre Joven, 2019
- "Señorita", a song by Inna from I Am the Club Rocker, 2011
- "Señorita", a song by Jake Owen from Greetings from... Jake, 2019
- "Senorita", a song by Jin from The Rest Is History, 2004
- "Señorita", a song by Juan Luis Guerra from Grandes Éxitos Juan Luis Guerra y 440, 1995
- "Señorita", a song by Kay One, 2017
- "Señorita", a song by Leah Turner, 2025
- "Senorita", a song by Lil Tecca from We Love You Tecca, 2019
- “Señorita", a song by Tenacious D from Rize of the Fenix, 2012
- "Señorita", a song by Vince Staples from Summertime '06, 2015

== Other uses ==
- Señorita bread, a Filipino bread roll
- Senorita Stakes, an American Thoroughbred horse race
- Senorita (sidewheeler), an American ship

== See also ==
- Señor (disambiguation)
