= Strontium (disambiguation) =

Strontium is a chemical element with symbol Sr and atomic number 38.

Strontium may also refer to:

- Strontium Technology, a Singaporean manufacturing company
- Strontium unit, a unit used to measure the amount of radioactivity from strontium-90
- STRONTIUM, a code name used by Microsoft for advanced persistent threat Fancy Bear

== See also ==
- Strontium Dog, a British science fiction comic series
- Sr (disambiguation)
- Isotopes of strontium
