= Junior Senior (disambiguation) =

Junior Senior may refer to:

- Junior Senior, Danish pop musical duo
- Junior Senior (2002 film), Indian Tamil film
- Junior Senior (2005 film), Indian Malayalam film
- Junior Senior (TV series), an Indian TV series

== See also ==
- Junior, Senior & Big League Baseball, youth baseball divisions of Little League Baseball
- Junior and senior, generational titles
- Junior (disambiguation)
- Senior (disambiguation)
