= Señor =

Señor or Senor may refer to:

== People ==
- Senor Abravanel (1930–2024), Brazilian TV presenter, best known as Silvio Santos
- Dan Senor (born 1971), American Canadian columnist, writer, and political adviser
- Juan Señor (born 1958), a Spanish footballer
- Thomas D. Senor (born 1960), American philosopher

== Arts, entertainment and media ==
- "Señor (Tales of Yankee Power)", 1978 song by Bob Dylan

== See also ==
- Honorific § Spanish-speaking cultures
- Senior
- Señorita (disambiguation)
- Senhor
