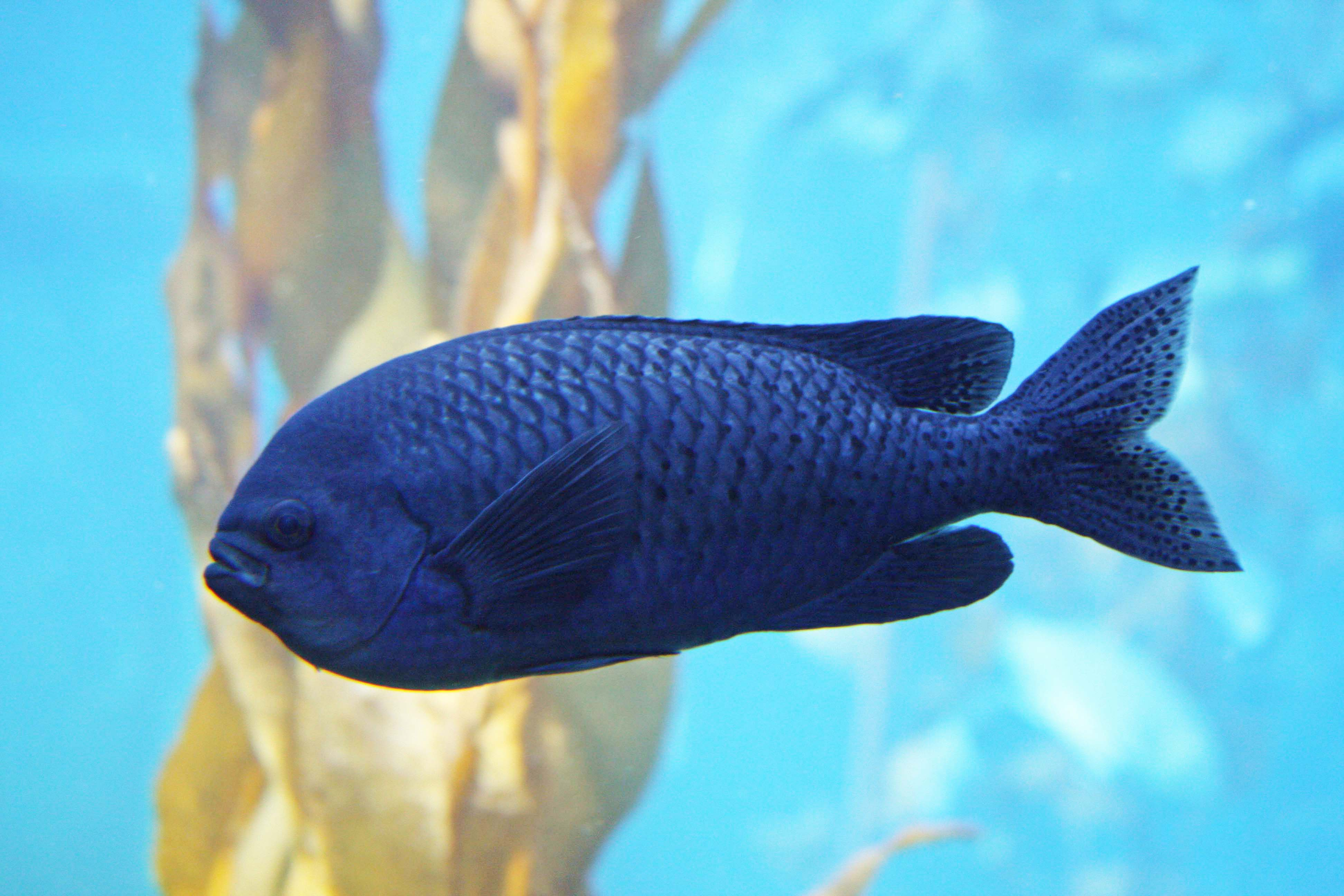

Conservation status
- Least Concern (IUCN 3.1)

Scientific classification
- Kingdom: Animalia
- Phylum: Chordata
- Class: Actinopterygii
- Division: Teleostei
- Order: Blenniiformes
- Family: Pomacentridae
- Genus: Chromis
- Species: C. punctipinnis

Binomial name
- Chromis punctipinnis (J.G. Cooper, 1863)

Synonyms
- Ayresia punctipinnis J.G. Cooper, 1863

= Chromis punctipinnis =

Species of fish

The blacksmith (Chromis punctipinnis), also known as the blacksmith chromis and blacksmith damselfish, is a species of fish in the damselfish family. It is native to the subtropical northeastern Pacific Ocean, where its range is from Monterey Bay, California, USA, to central Baja California, Mexico. This small fish is associated with rocky reefs and kelp forests.

== Description ==
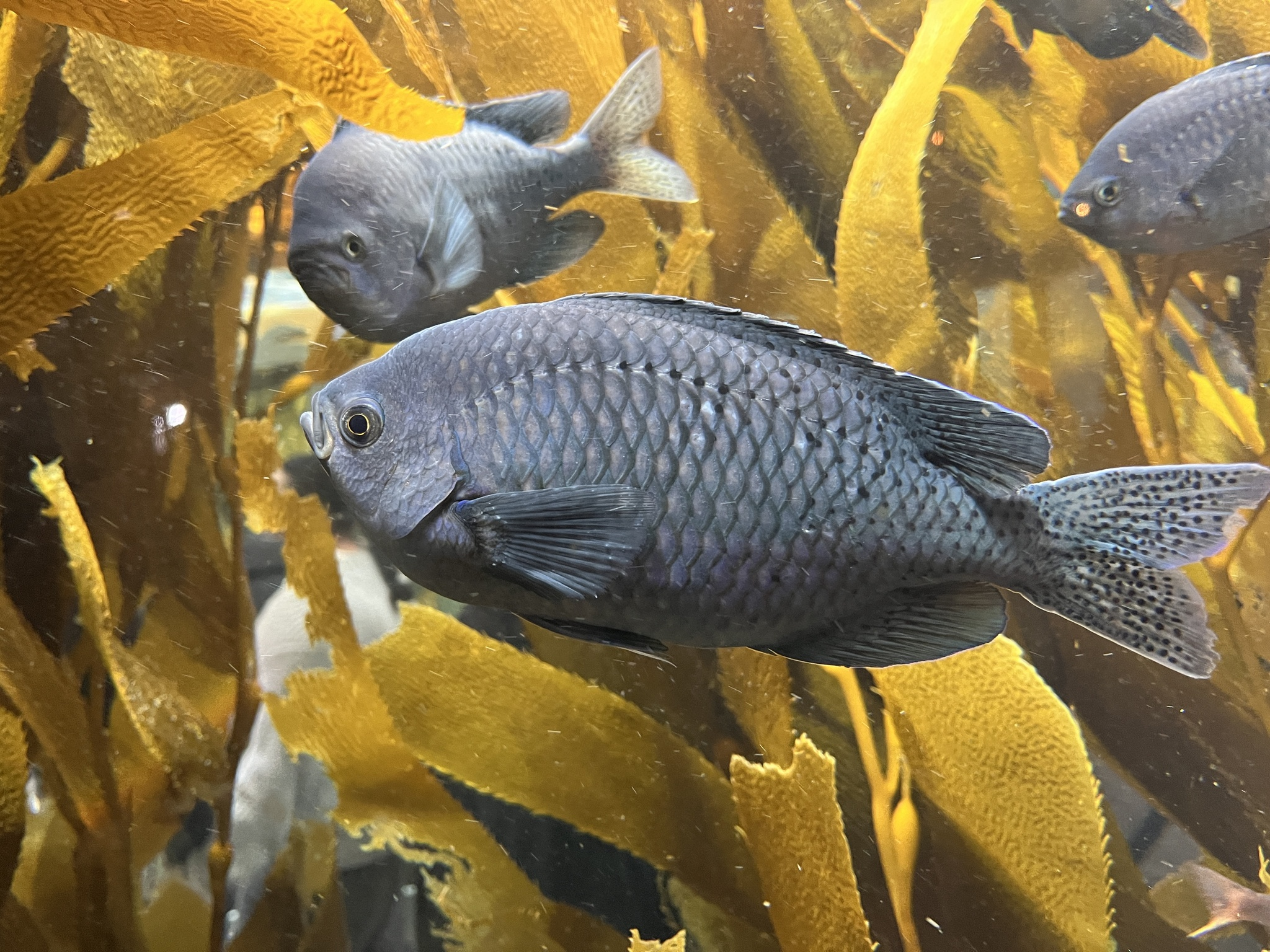
At the Monterey Bay Aquarium

The blacksmith can reach 25 centimetres (10 in) in length. It is blue-black in color with small black spots towards the tail. The scales are large. The tail is forked. The juvenile is two-toned with a blue-grey front and a brownish-orange rear.

== Ecology ==
=== Habitat ===
The fish lives at depths up to 46 metres (151 ft), usually close to the sea floor, over rocks, or on slopes. It also inhabits kelp forests.

=== Diet ===
The diet includes marine algae and zooplankton.

=== Behaviour ===
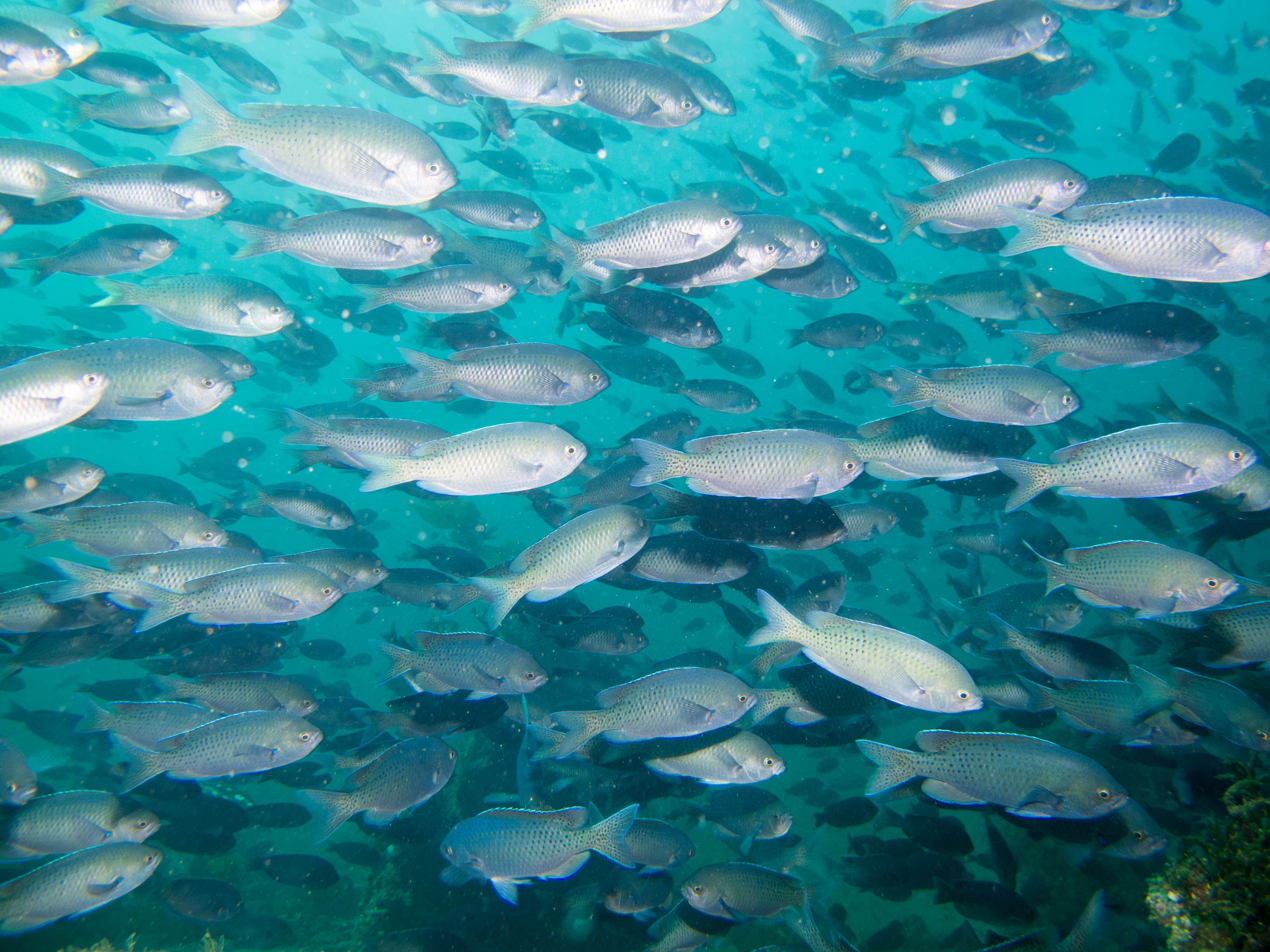
School of Blacksmith on the Peacock Wreck, offshore of Anacapa Island

The blacksmith rests in rocky crevices during the night. It is known to be territorial, and, although small, it acts aggressively toward other fish. Juveniles are pelagic and form schools. The blacksmith is symbiotic with the señorita. When it feels that it is starting to deteriorate in hygiene it will turn until it is perpendicular to the ground, allowing the señorita to clean it.

== Reproduction ==
The blacksmith spawns during summer and autumn. The male cleans a nesting site, then herds a female to it. After spawning, the male guards the eggs until they hatch.
