= Senior =

Senior (shortened as Sr.) means "the elder" in Latin and is often used as a suffix for the elder of two or more people in the same family with the same given name, usually a parent or grandparent. It may also refer to:

- Senior (name), a surname or given name
- Senior (education), a student in the final year of high school, college or university
- Senior citizen, a common designation for a person 65 and older in UK and US English
  - Senior (athletics), an age athletics category
  - Senior status, form of semi-retirement for United States federal judges
- Senior debt, a form of corporate finance
- Senior producer, a title given usually to the second most senior person of a film of television production.

== Art ==
- Senior (album), a 2010 album by Röyksopp
- Seniors (film), a 2011 Indian Malayalam film
- Senior (film), a 2015 Thai film
- The Senior, a 2003 album by Ginuwine
- The Seniors, a 1978 American comedy film
- The Senior, a 2023 sports drama

== See also ==
- Pages that begin with "Senior"
- Seniority
- Senioritis, colloquial term used in the United States and Canada
- Sr. (disambiguation)
- Señor
- Senhor
- 12th grade, also called senior year of high school
- Wise old man, archetype
