= Shoaling and schooling =

In biology, any group of fish that stay together for social reasons

Shoaling and schooling

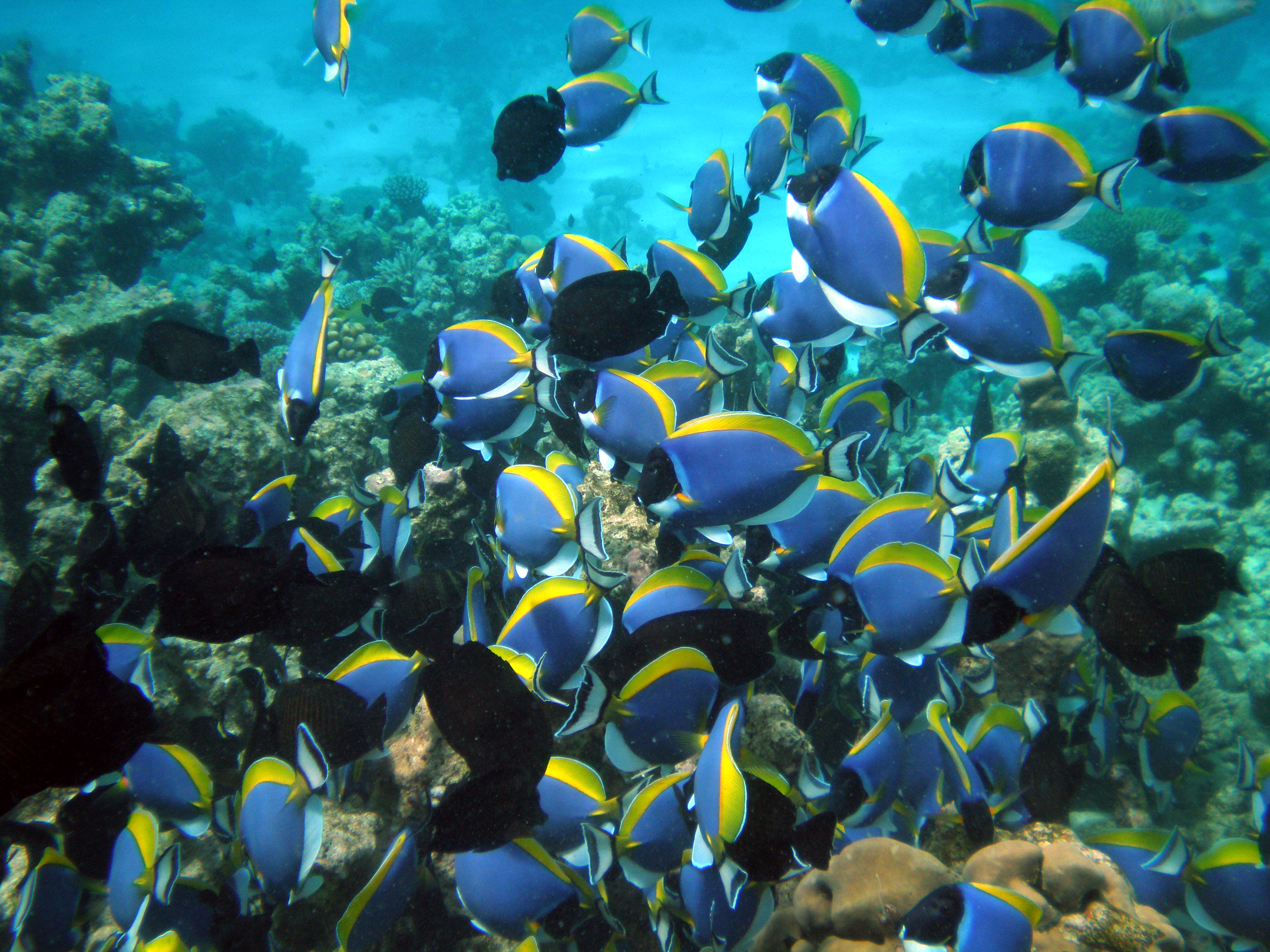
These powder blue tangs are shoaling. They are swimming somewhat independently, but in such a way that they stay connected, forming a social group.

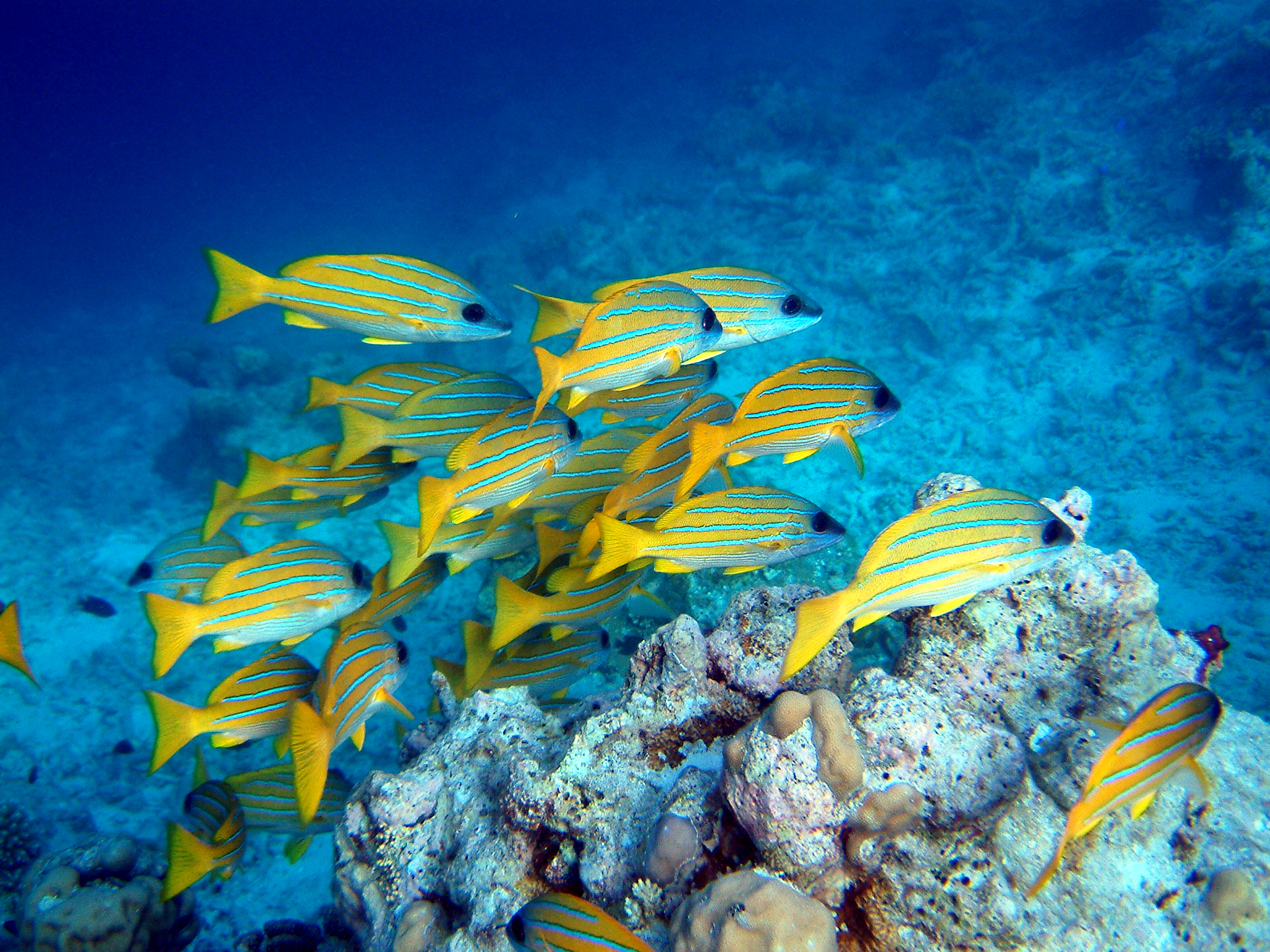
These bluestripe snapper are schooling. They are all swimming in the same direction in a coordinated way.

In biology, any group of fish that stay together for social reasons are shoaling, and if the group is swimming in the same direction in a coordinated manner, they are schooling. In common usage, the terms are sometimes used rather loosely. About one quarter of fish species shoal all their lives, and about one half shoal for part of their lives.

Fish derive many benefits from shoaling behaviour including defence against predators (through better predator detection and by diluting the chance of individual capture), enhanced foraging success, and higher success in finding a mate.

Fish benefit from schooling through increased hydrodynamic efficiency, meaning they move faster and expend less energy.

Fish use many traits to choose shoalmates. Generally they prefer larger shoals, shoalmates of their own species, shoalmates similar in size and appearance to themselves, healthy fish, and kin (when recognized). The oddity effect posits that any shoal member that stands out in appearance will be preferentially targeted by predators, thus homogenising shoals.

== Overview ==
Underwater video loop of a school of herrings migrating at high speed to their spawning grounds in the Baltic Sea

An aggregation of fish is the general term for any collection of fish that have gathered together in some locality. Fish aggregations can be structured or unstructured. An unstructured aggregation might be a group of mixed species and sizes that have gathered randomly near some local resource, such as food or nesting sites.

If, in addition, the aggregation comes together in an interactive, social way, they may be said to be shoaling. (Note: Other collective nouns used for fish include a draught of fish, a drift of fish, or a scale of fish. Collective nouns used for specific fish or marine animal species groups include a grind of blackfish, a troubling of goldfish, glean of herrings, bind or run of salmon, shiver of sharks, fever of stingrays, taint of tilapia, hover of trouts and pod of whales.) Although shoaling fish can relate to each other in a loose way, with each fish swimming and foraging somewhat independently, they are nonetheless aware of the other members of the group as shown by the way they adjust behaviour such as swimming, so as to remain close to the other fish in the group. Shoaling groups can include fish of disparate sizes and can include mixed-species subgroups.

If the shoal becomes more tightly organised, with the fish synchronising their swimming so they all move at the same speed and in the same direction, then the fish may be said to be schooling. (Note: Shoaling is a special case of aggregating, and schooling is a special case of shoaling. While schooling and shoaling mean different things within biology, they are often treated as synonyms by non-specialists, with speakers of British English tending to use "shoaling" to describe any grouping of fish, while speakers of American English tend to use "schooling" just as loosely.) Schooling fish are usually of the same species and the same age/size. Fish schools move with the individual members precisely spaced from each other. The schools undertake complicated manoeuvres, as though the schools have minds of their own.

The intricacies of schooling are far from fully understood, especially the swimming and feeding energetics. Many hypotheses to explain the function of schooling have been suggested, such as better orientation, synchronized hunting, predator confusion and reduced risk of being found. Schooling also has disadvantages, such as excretion buildup in the breathing media and oxygen and food depletion. The way the fish array in the school probably gives energy saving advantages, though this is controversial.

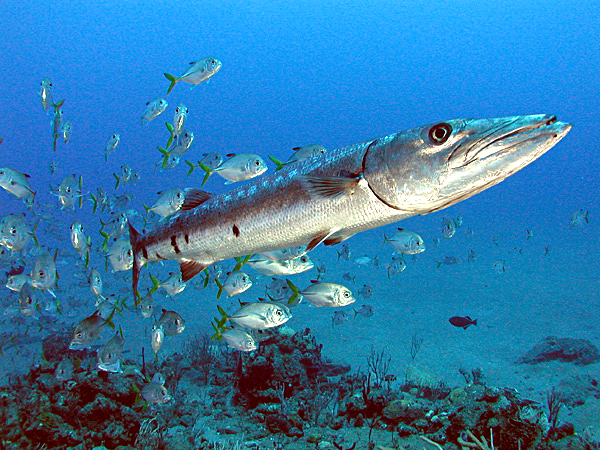
Schools of forage fish often accompany large predator fish. Here a school of jacks accompany a great barracuda.

Fish can be obligate or facultative (optional) shoalers. Obligate shoalers, such as tunas, herrings and anchovy, spend all of their time shoaling or schooling, and become agitated if separated from the group. Facultative shoalers, such as Atlantic cod, saiths and some carangids, shoal only some of the time, perhaps for reproductive purposes.

Shoaling fish can shift into a disciplined and coordinated school, then shift back to an amorphous shoal within seconds. Such shifts are triggered by changes of activity from feeding, resting, travelling or avoiding predators.

When schooling fish stop to feed, they break ranks and become shoals. Shoals are more vulnerable to predator attack. The shape a shoal or school takes depends on the type of fish and what the fish are doing. Schools that are travelling can form long thin lines, or squares or ovals or amoeboid shapes. Fast moving schools usually form a wedge shape, while shoals that are feeding tend to become circular.

Forage fish are small fish which are preyed on by larger predators for food. Predators include other larger fish, seabirds and marine mammals. Typical ocean forage fish are small, filter-feeding fish such as herring, anchovies and menhaden. Forage fish compensate for their small size by forming schools. Some swim in synchronised grids with their mouths open so they can efficiently filter feed on plankton. These schools can become huge (in the tens of millions), moving along coastlines and migrating across open oceans. The shoals are concentrated food resources for the great marine predators.

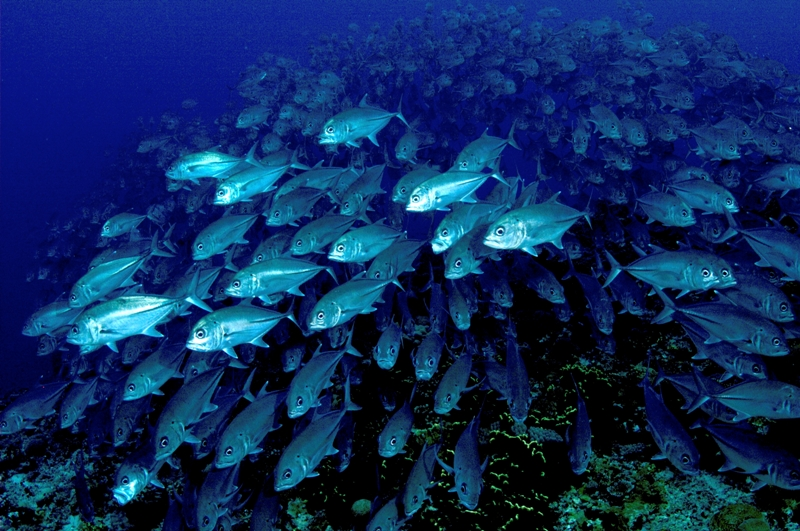
A school of fish has many eyes that can scan for food or threats.

Pacific sardine school reacting to attention from yellowfin tuna

These sometimes immense gatherings fuel the ocean food web. Most forage fish are pelagic fish, which means they form their schools in open water, and not on or near the bottom (demersal fish). Forage fish are short-lived, and go mostly unnoticed by humans. The predators are keenly focused on the shoals, acutely aware of their numbers and whereabouts, and make migrations themselves, often in schools of their own, that can span thousands of miles to connect with, or stay connected with them.

Herring are among the more spectacular schooling fish. They aggregate together in huge numbers. The largest schools are often formed during migrations by merging with smaller schools. "Chains" of schools one hundred kilometres (62 miles) long have been observed of mullet migrating in the Caspian Sea. Radakov estimated herring schools in the North Atlantic can occupy up to 4.8 cubic kilometres (1.2 cubic miles) with fish densities between 0.5 and 1.0 fish/cubic metre (3/8 to 3/4 fish per cubic yard), totalling about three billion fish in a single school. These schools move along coastlines and traverse the open oceans. Herring schools in general have very precise arrangements which allow the school to maintain relatively constant cruising speeds. Herrings have excellent hearing, and their schools react very rapidly to a predator. The herrings keep a certain distance from a moving scuba diver or a cruising predator like a killer whale, forming a vacuole which looks like a doughnut from a spotter plane.

Many species of large predatory fish also school, including many highly migratory fish, such as tuna and some oceangoing sharks. Cetaceans such as dolphins, porpoises and whales, operate in organised social groups called pods.

"Shoaling behaviour is generally described as a trade-off between the anti-predator benefits of living in groups and the costs of increased foraging competition." Landa (1998) argues that the cumulative advantages of shoaling, as elaborated below, are strong selective inducements for fish to join shoals. Parrish et al. (2002) argue similarly that schooling is a classic example of emergence, where there are properties that are possessed by the school but not by the individual fish. Emergent properties give an evolutionary advantage to members of the school which non members do not receive.

== Social interaction ==
Support for the social and genetic function of aggregations, especially those formed by fish, can be seen in several aspects of their behaviour. For instance, experiments have shown that individual fish removed from a school will have a higher respiratory rate than those found in the school. This effect has been attributed to stress, and the effect of being with conspecifics therefore appears to be a calming one and a powerful social motivation for remaining in an aggregation. Herring, for instance, will become very agitated if they are isolated from conspecifics. Because of their adaptation to schooling behaviour they are rarely displayed in aquaria. Even with the best facilities aquaria can offer they become fragile and sluggish compared to their quivering energy in wild schools.

== Foraging advantages ==
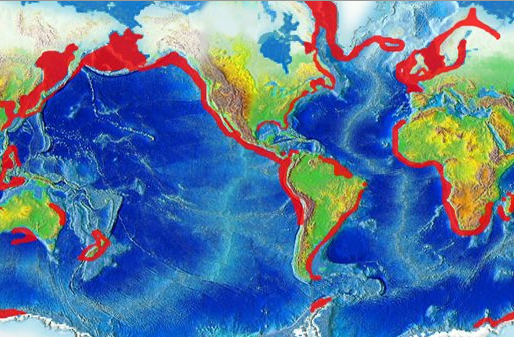
Some coastal upwellings (red) provide plankton-rich feeding grounds for shoals of forage fish, which in turn attract larger predator fish.

It has also been proposed that swimming in groups enhances foraging success. This ability was demonstrated by Pitcher and others in their study of foraging behaviour in shoaling cyprinids. In this study, the time it took for groups of minnows and goldfish to find a patch of food verity was quantified. The number of fishes in the groups was varied, and a statistically significant decrease in the amount of time necessary for larger groups to find food was established. Further support for an enhanced foraging capability of schools is seen in the structure of schools of predatory fish. Partridge and others analysed the school structure of Atlantic bluefin tuna from aerial photographs and found that the school assumed a parabolic shape, a fact that was suggestive of cooperative hunting in this species.

"The reason for this is the presence of many eyes searching for the food. Fish in shoals "share" information by monitoring each other's behaviour closely. Feeding behaviour in one fish quickly stimulates food-searching behaviour in others.

Fertile feeding grounds for forage fish are provided by ocean upwellings. Oceanic gyres are large-scale ocean currents caused by the Coriolis effect. Wind-driven surface currents interact with these gyres and the underwater topography, such as seamounts, fishing banks, and the edge of continental shelves, to produce downwellings and upwellings. These can transport nutrients which plankton thrive on. The result can be rich feeding grounds attractive to the plankton feeding forage fish. In turn, the forage fish themselves become a feeding ground for larger predator fish. Most upwellings are coastal, and many of them support some of the most productive fisheries in the world. Regions of notable upwelling include coastal Peru, Chile, Arabian Sea, western South Africa, eastern New Zealand and the California coast.

Copepods, the primary zooplankton, are a major item on the forage fish menu. They are a group of small crustaceans found in ocean and freshwater habitats. Copepods are typically one to two millimetres (0.039 to 0.079 inches) long, with a teardrop shaped body. Some scientists say they form the largest animal biomass on the planet. Copepods are very alert and evasive. They have large antennae (see photo below left). When they spread their antennae they can sense the pressure wave from an approaching fish and jump with great speed over a few centimeters. If copepod concentrations reach high levels, schooling herrings adopt a method called ram feeding. In the photo below, herring ram feed on a school of copepods. They swim with their mouth wide open and their opercula fully expanded.

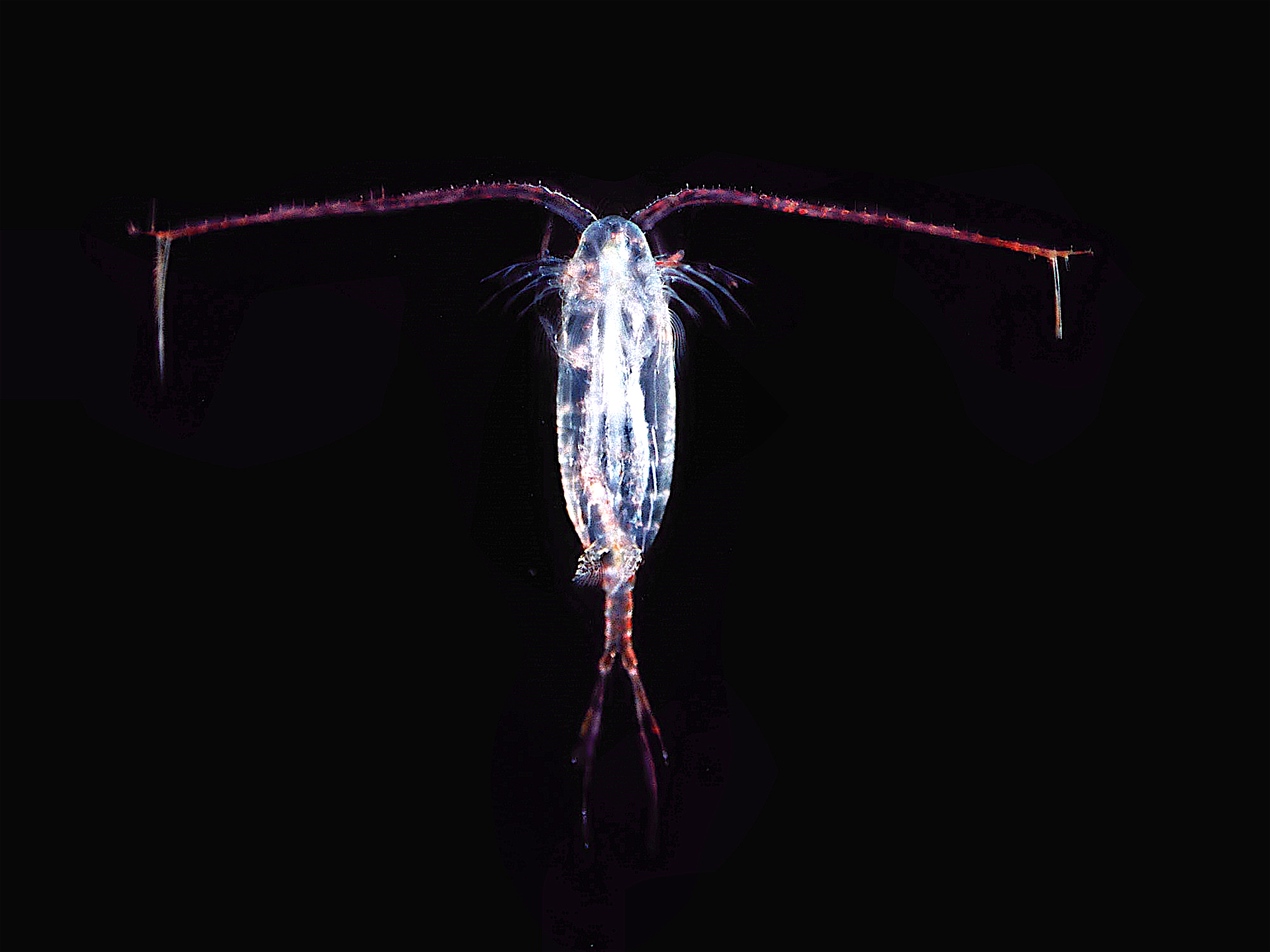
This copepod has its antenna spread (click to enlarge). The antenna detects the pressure wave of an approaching fish.

Copepods are a major food source for forage fish like this Atlantic herring.

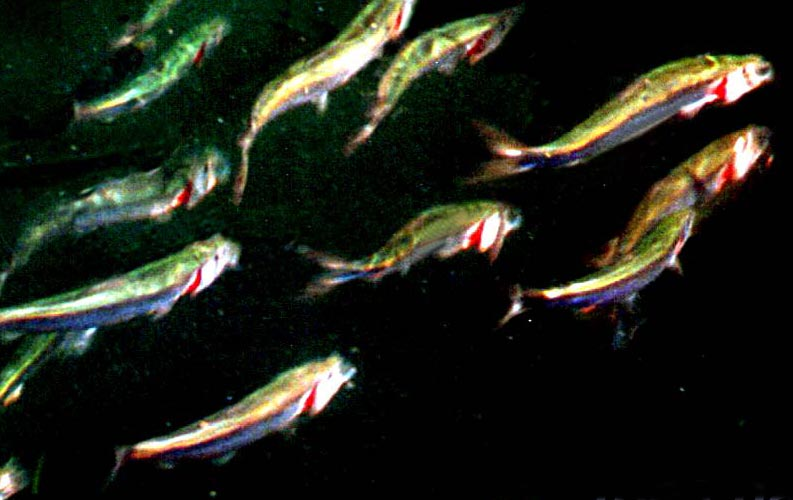
School of herrings ram-feeding on a school of copepods, with opercula expanded so their red gills are visible

Animation showing how herrings hunting in a synchronised way can capture the very alert and evasive copepod

The fish swim in a grid where the distance between them is the same as the jump length of their prey, as indicated in the animation above right. In the animation, juvenile herring hunt the copepods in this synchronised way. The copepods sense with their antennae the pressure-wave of an approaching herring and react with a fast escape jump. The length of the jump is fairly constant. The fish align themselves in a grid with this characteristic jump length. A copepod can dart about 80 times before it tires. After a jump, it takes it 60 milliseconds to spread its antennae again, and this time delay becomes its undoing, as the almost endless stream of herrings allows a herring to eventually snap the copepod. A single juvenile herring could never catch a large copepod.

== Reproductive advantages ==
A third proposed benefit of fish groups is that they serve a reproductive function. They provide increased access to potential mates, since finding a mate in a shoal does not take much energy. And for migrating fish that navigate long distances to spawn, it is likely that the navigation of the shoal, with an input from all the shoal members, will be better than that taken by an individual fish.

Migration of Icelandic capelin

Forage fish often make great migrations between their spawning, feeding and nursery grounds. Schools of a particular stock usually travel in a triangle between these grounds. For example, one stock of herrings have their spawning ground in southern Norway, their feeding ground in Iceland, and their nursery ground in northern Norway. Wide triangular journeys such as these may be important because forage fish, when feeding, cannot distinguish their own offspring.

Capelin are a forage fish of the smelt family found in the Atlantic and Arctic oceans. In summer, they graze on dense swarms of plankton at the edge of the ice shelf. Larger capelin also eat krill and other crustaceans. The capelin move inshore in large schools to spawn and migrate in spring and summer to feed in plankton rich areas between Iceland, Greenland, and Jan Mayen. The migration is affected by ocean currents. Around Iceland maturing capelin make large northward feeding migrations in spring and summer. The return migration takes place in September to November. The spawning migration starts north of Iceland in December or January.

== Hydrodynamic efficiency ==
This theory states that groups of fish may save energy when swimming together, much in the way that bicyclists may draft one another in a peloton. Geese flying in a Vee formation are also thought to save energy by flying in the updraft of the wingtip vortex generated by the previous animal in the formation. Increased efficiencies in swimming in groups have been proposed for schools of fish and Antarctic krill.

It would seem reasonable to think that the regular spacing and size uniformity of fish in schools would result in hydrodynamic efficiencies. While early laboratory-based experiments failed to detect hydrodynamic benefits created by the neighbours of a fish in a school, it is thought that efficiency gains do occur in the wild. More recent experiments with groups of fish swimming in flumes support this, with fish reducing their swimming costs by as much as 20% as compared to when the same fish are swimming in isolation. Landa (1998) argued that the leader of a school constantly changes, because while being in the body of a school gives a hydrodynamic advantage, the leader will be the first to the food. More recent work suggests that, after individuals at the front of the school encounter and ingest more food, they then relocate further back within the school due to the locomotor constraints generated during meal digestion.

== Predator avoidance ==
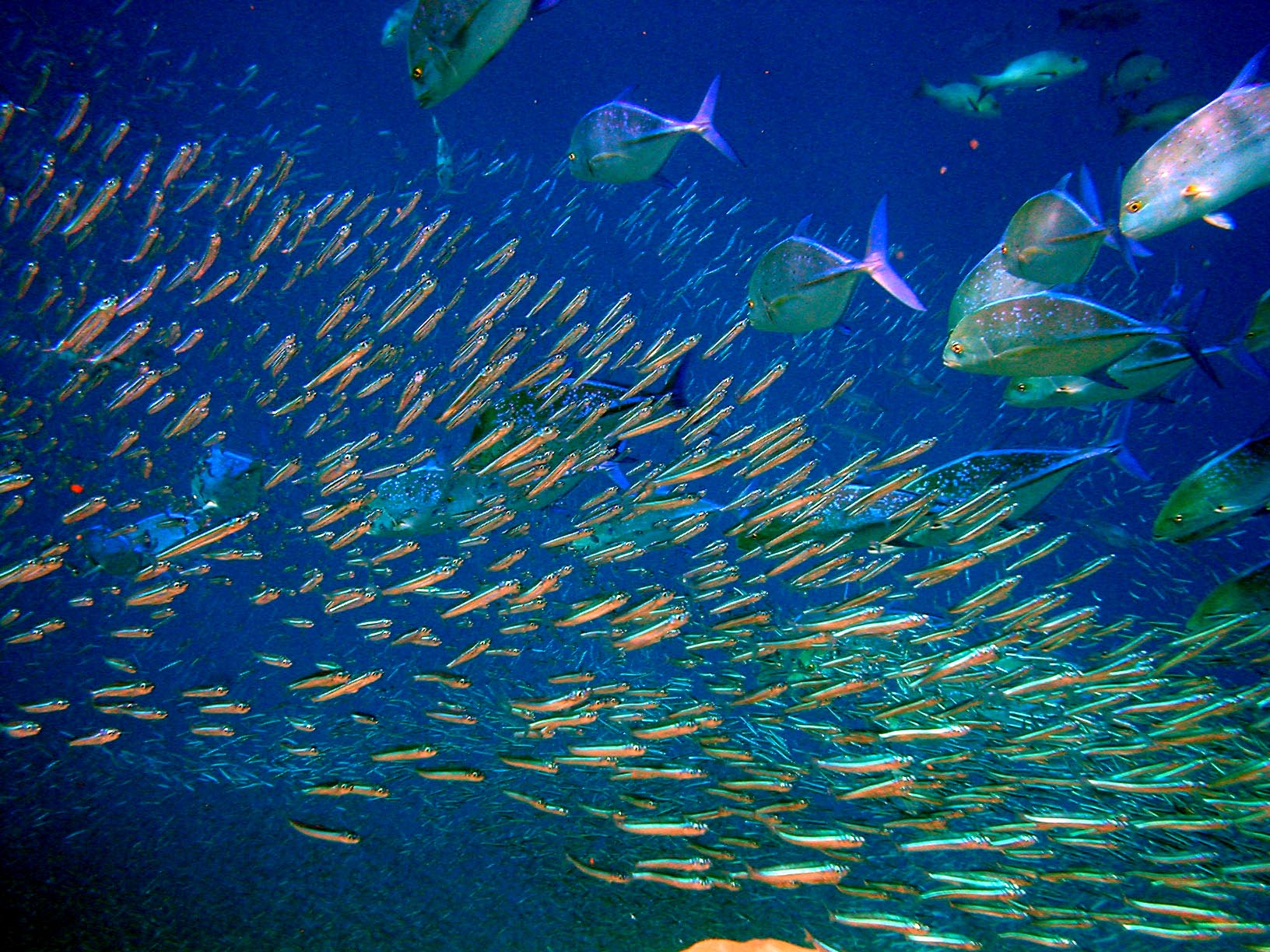
Schooling predator bluefin trevally size up schooling anchovies.

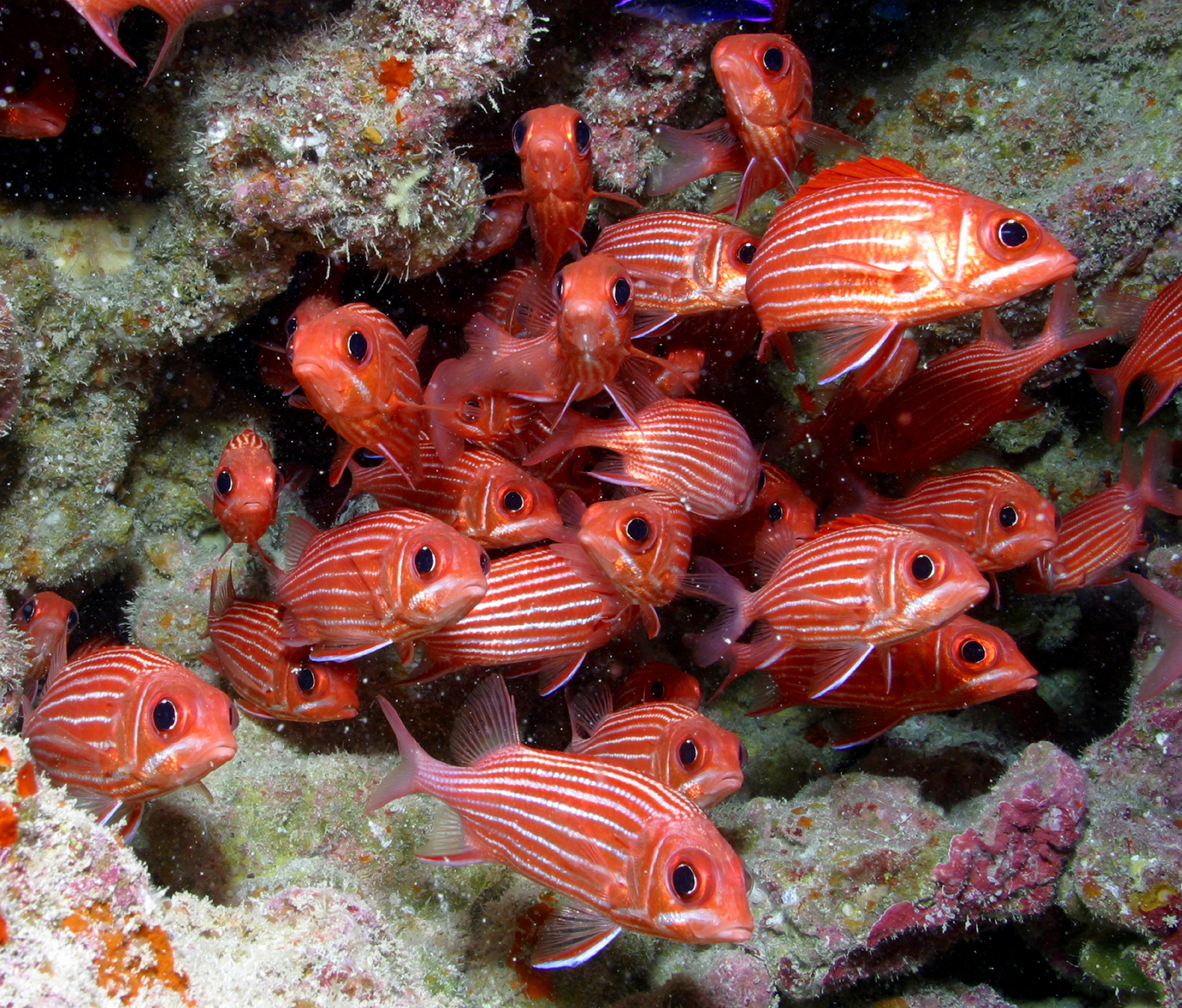
Many eyes provide a higher level of vigilance.

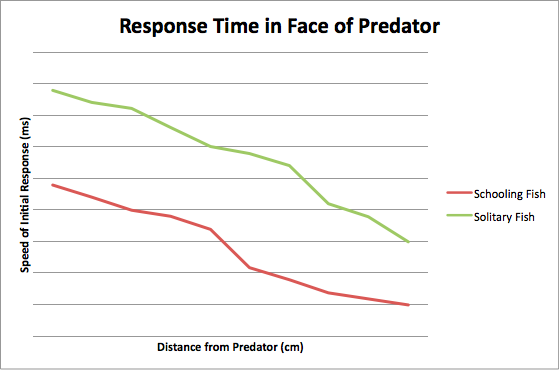
Schooling response time in face of predator

It is commonly observed that schooling fish are particularly in danger of being eaten if they are separated from the school. Several anti-predator functions of fish schools have been proposed.

One potential method by which fish schools might thwart predators is the "predator confusion effect" proposed and demonstrated by Milinski and Heller (1978). This theory is based on the idea that it becomes difficult for predators to choose individual prey from groups because the many moving targets create a sensory overload of the predator's visual channel. Milinski and Heller's findings have been corroborated both in experiment and computer simulations. "Shoaling fish are the same size and silvery, so it is difficult for a visually oriented predator to pick an individual out of a mass of twisting, flashing fish and then have enough time to grab its prey before it disappears into the shoal."

Schooling behaviour confuses the lateral line organ (LLO) as well as the electrosensory system (ESS) of predators. Fin movements of a single fish act as a point-shaped wave source, emitting a gradient by which predators might localize it. Since fields of many fish will overlap, schooling should obscure this gradient, perhaps mimicking pressure waves of a larger animal, and more likely confuse the lateral line perception. The LLO is essential in the final stages of a predator attack. Electro-receptive animals may localize a field source by using spatial non-uniformities. To produce separate signals, individual prey must be about five body widths apart. If objects are too close together to be distinguished, they will form a blurred image. Based on this it was suggested that schooling may confuse the ESS of predators.

A third potential anti-predator effect of animal aggregations is the "many eyes" hypothesis. This theory states that as the size of the group increases, the task of scanning the environment for predators can be spread out over many individuals. Not only does this mass collaboration presumably provide a higher level of vigilance, it could also allow more time for individual feeding.

A fourth hypothesis for an anti-predatory effect of fish schools is the "encounter dilution" effect. The dilution effect is an elaboration of safety in numbers, and interacts with the confusion effect. A given predator attack will eat a smaller proportion of a large shoal than a small shoal. Hamilton proposed that animals aggregate because of a "selfish" avoidance of a predator and was thus a form of cover-seeking. Another formulation of the theory was given by Turner and Pitcher and was viewed as a combination of detection and attack probabilities. In the detection component of the theory, it was suggested that potential prey might benefit by living together since a predator is less likely to chance upon a single group than a scattered distribution. In the attack component, it was thought that an attacking predator is less likely to eat a particular fish when a greater number of fish are present. In sum, a fish has an advantage if it is in the larger of two groups, assuming that the probability of detection and attack does not increase disproportionately with the size of the group.

Schooling forage fish are subject to constant attacks by predators. An example is the attacks that take place during the African sardine run. The African sardine run is a spectacular migration by millions of silvery sardines along the southern coastline of Africa. In terms of biomass, the sardine run could rival East Africa's great wildebeest migration. Sardines have a short life-cycle, living only two or three years. Adult sardines, about two years old, mass on the Agulhas Bank where they spawn during spring and summer, releasing tens of thousands of eggs into the water. The adult sardines then make their way in hundreds of shoals towards the sub-tropical waters of the Indian Ocean. A larger shoal might be 7 kilometres (4.3 mi) long, 1.5 kilometres (0.93 mi) wide and 30 metres (98 ft) deep. Huge numbers of sharks, dolphins, tuna, sailfish, Cape fur seals and even killer whales congregate and follow the shoals, creating a feeding frenzy along the coastline.

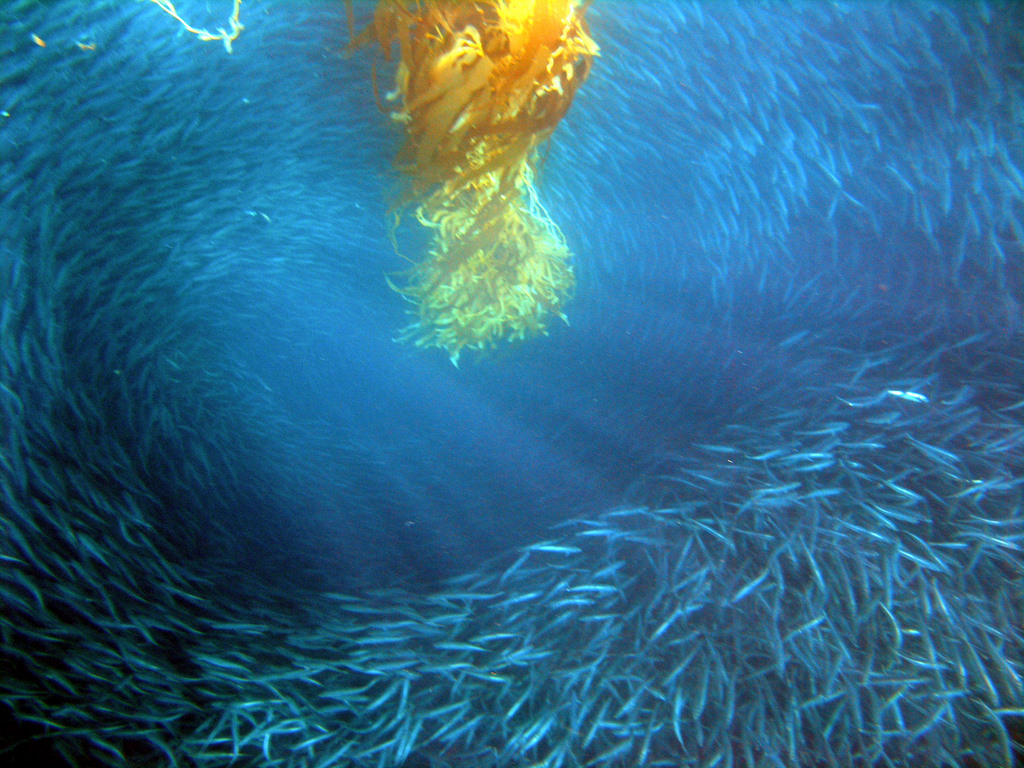
A big bait ball swirling around a loose kelp stipe

When threatened, sardines (and other forage fish) instinctively group together and create massive bait balls. Bait balls can be up to 20 metres (66 ft) in diameter. They are short lived, seldom lasting longer than 20 minutes. The fish eggs, left behind at the Agulhas Banks, drift north west with the current into waters off the west coast, where the larvae develop into juvenile fish. When they are old enough, they aggregate into dense shoals and migrate southwards, returning to the Agulhas banks to restart the cycle.

The development of schooling behavior was probably associated with an increased quality of perception, predatory lifestyle and size sorting mechanisms to avoid cannibalism. In filter-feeding ancestors, before vision and the octavolateralis system (OLS) had developed, the risk of predation would have been limited and mainly due to invertebrate predators. Hence, at that time, safety in numbers was probably not a major incentive for gathering in shoals or schools. The development of vision and the OLS would have permitted detection of potential prey. This could have led to an increased potential for cannibalism within the shoal. On the other hand, increased quality of perception would give small individuals a chance to escape or to never join a shoal with larger fish. It has been shown that small fish avoid joining a group with larger fish, although big fish do not avoid joining small conspecifics. This sorting mechanism based on increased quality of perception could have resulted in homogeneity of size of fish in shoals, which would increase the capacity for moving in synchrony.

== Predator countermeasures ==
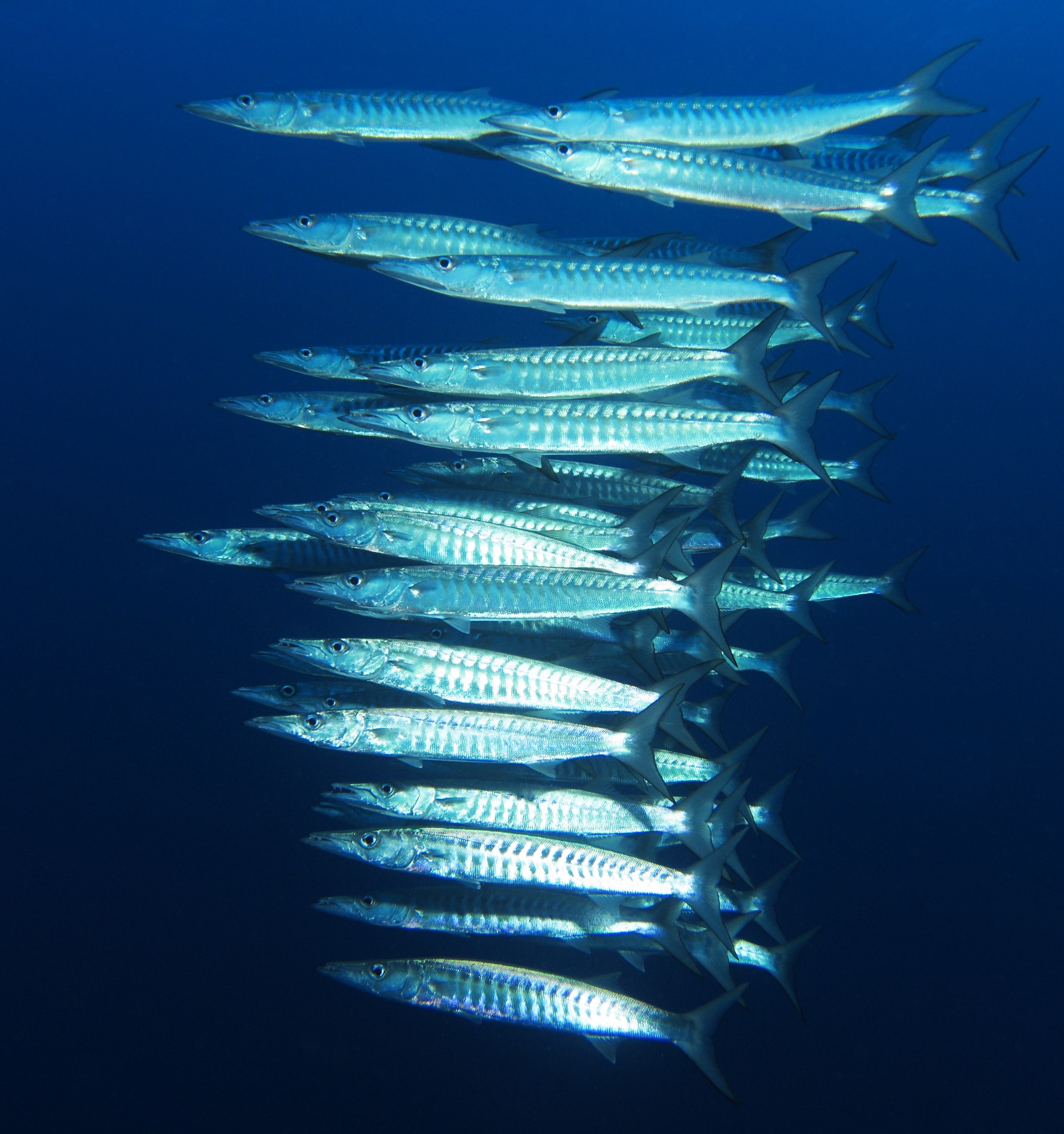
School of blackfin barracuda lined up in attack mode

Predators have devised various countermeasures to undermine the defensive shoaling and schooling manoeuvres of forage fish. The sailfish raises its sail to make it appear much larger so it can herd a school of fish or squid. Swordfish charge at high speed through forage fish schools, slashing with their swords to kill or stun prey. They then turn and return to consume their "catch". Thresher sharks use their long tails to stun shoaling fishes. Before striking, the sharks compact schools of prey by swimming around them and splashing the water with their tails, often in pairs or small groups. Threshers swim in circles to drive schooling prey into a compact mass, before striking them sharply with the upper lobe of its tail to stun them. Spinner sharks charge vertically through the school, spinning on their axis with their mouths open and snapping all around. The shark's momentum at the end of these spiralling runs often carries it into the air.

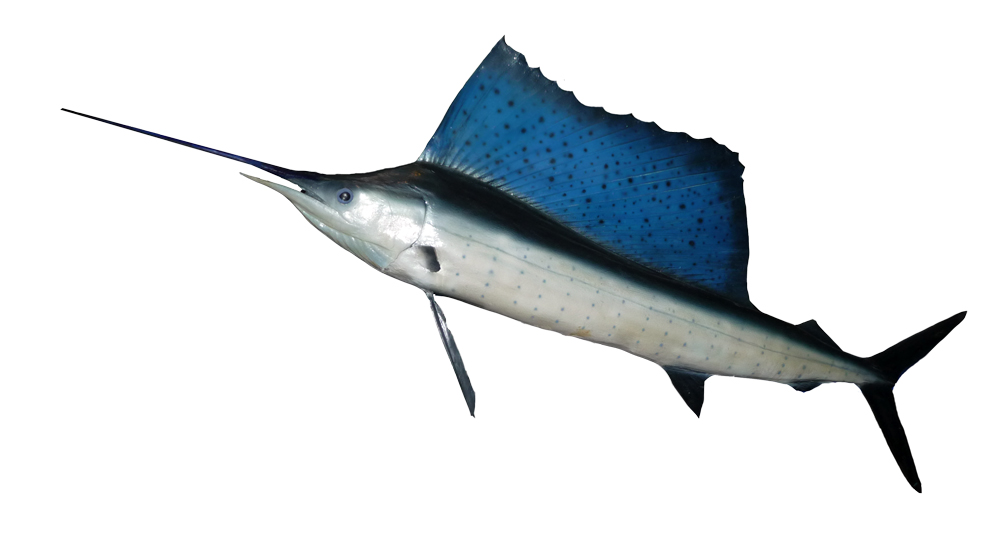
Sailfish herd with their sails.

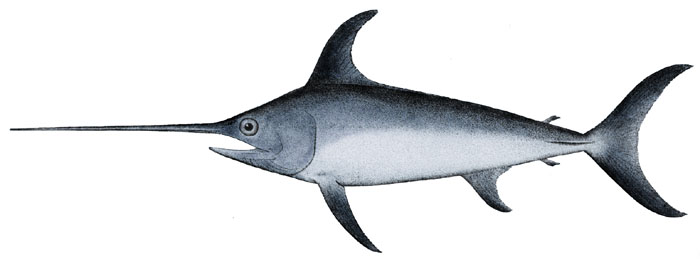
Swordfish slash with their swords.

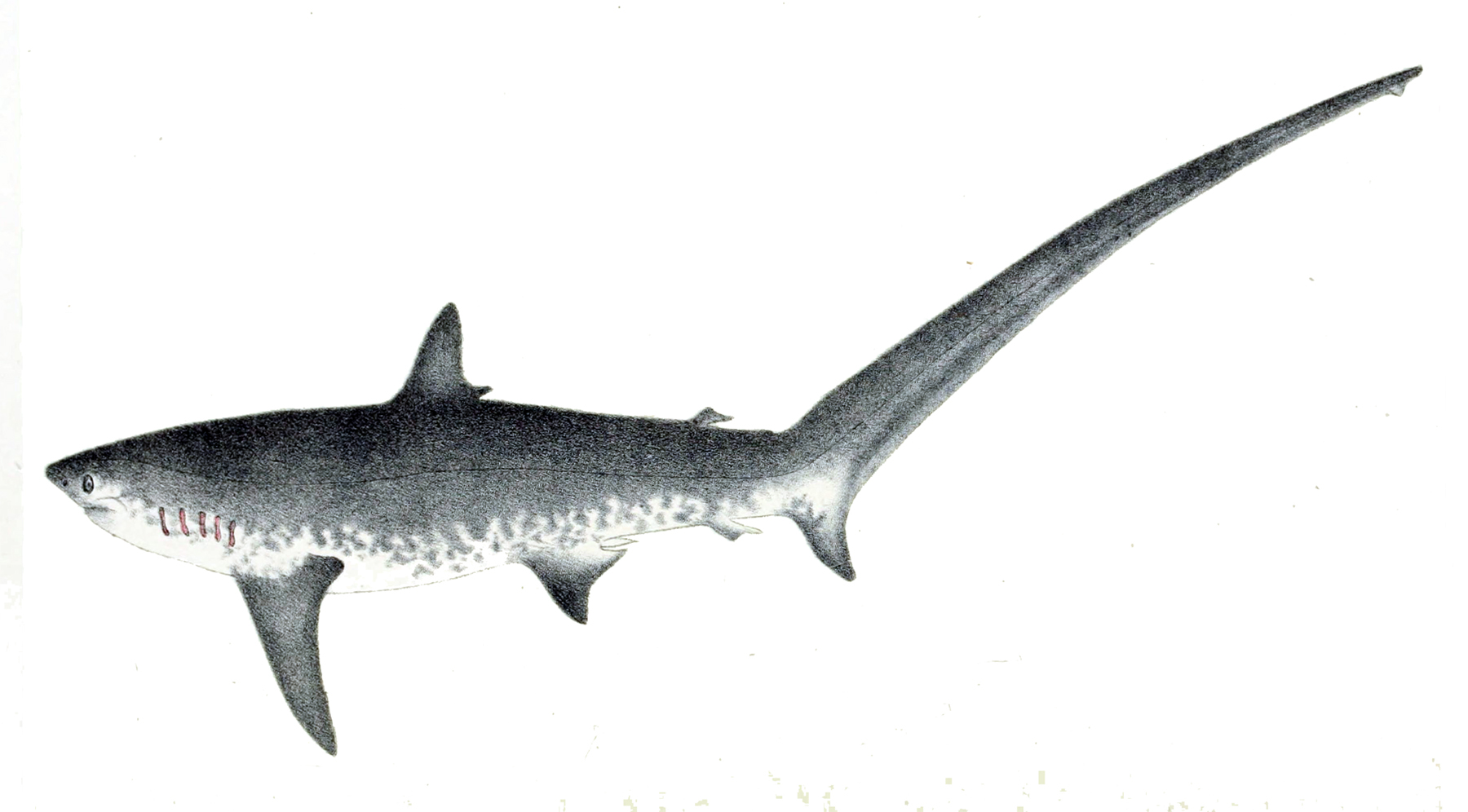
Thresher sharks strike with their tails.

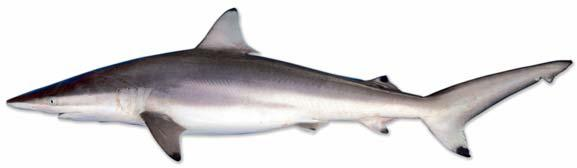
Spinner sharks spin on their long axis.
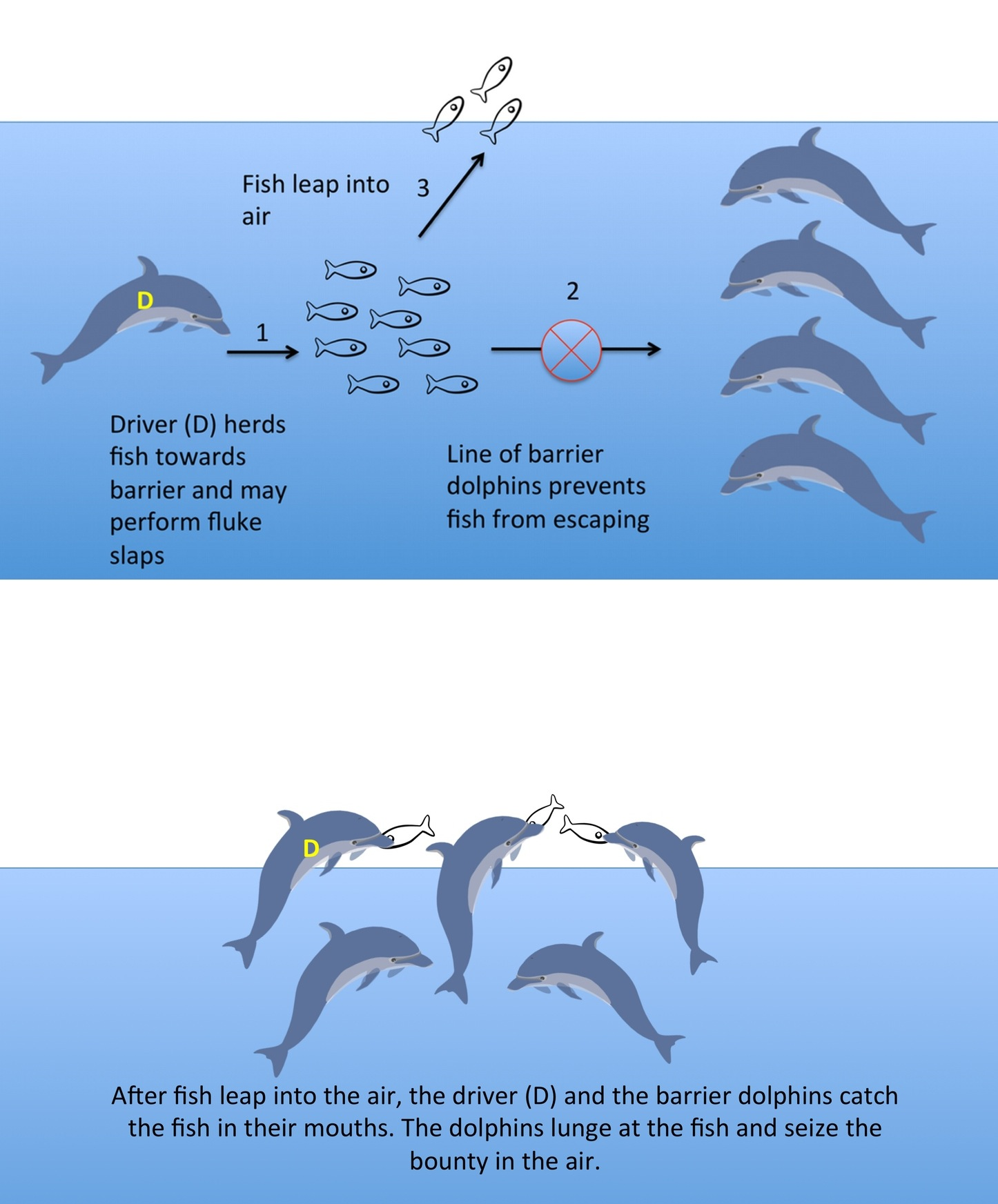
↑ A team of common bottlenose dolphins cooperate to make schooling fish jump in the air. In this vulnerable position the fish are easy prey for the dolphins.

Some predators, such as dolphins, hunt in groups of their own. One technique employed by many dolphin species is herding, where a pod will control a school of fish while individual members take turns ploughing through and feeding on the more tightly packed school (a formation commonly known as a bait ball). Corralling is a method where fish are chased to shallow water where they are more easily captured. In South Carolina, the Atlantic bottlenose dolphin takes this one step further with what has become known as strand feeding, where the fish are driven onto mud banks and retrieved from there.

Common bottlenose dolphins have been observed using another technique. One dolphin acts as a "driver" and herds a school of fish towards several other dolphins who form a barrier. The driver dolphin slaps its fluke which makes the fish leap into the air. As the fish leap, the driver dolphin moves with the barrier dolphins and catches the fish in the air. This type of cooperative role specialization seems to be more common in marine animals than in terrestrial animals, perhaps because the oceans have more variability in prey diversity, biomass, and predator mobility.

During the sardine run, as many as 18,000 dolphins, behaving like sheepdogs, herd the sardines into bait balls, or corral them in shallow water. Once the bait balls are rounded up, the dolphins and other predators take turns ploughing through them, gorging on the fish as they sweep through. Seabirds also attack them from above, flocks of gannets, cormorants, terns and gulls. Some of these seabirds plummet from heights of 30 metres (98 ft), plunging through the water leaving vapour-like trails, similar to that of fighter planes. Gannets plunge into the water at up to 100 kilometres per hour (60 mph). They have air sacs under their skin in their face and chest which act like bubble-wrap, cushioning the impact with the water.

Subsets of bottlenose dolphin populations in Mauritania are known to engage in interspecific cooperative fishing with human fishermen. The dolphins drive a school of fish towards the shore where humans await with their nets. In the confusion of casting nets, the dolphins catch a large number of fish as well. Intraspecific cooperative foraging techniques have also been observed, and some propose that these behaviours are transmitted through cultural means. Rendell & Whitehead have proposed a structure for the study of culture in cetaceans.

Some whales lunge feed on bait balls. Lunge feeding is an extreme feeding method, in which the whale accelerates from below a bait ball to a high velocity and then opens its mouth to a large gape angle. This generates the water pressure required to expand its mouth and engulf and filter a huge amount of water and fish. Lunge feeding by the huge rorquals is said to be the largest biomechanical event on Earth.

External videos
- Dolphins herd sardines.
- Gannets "divebomb" sardines.
- Cooperative hunting by Sailfish.

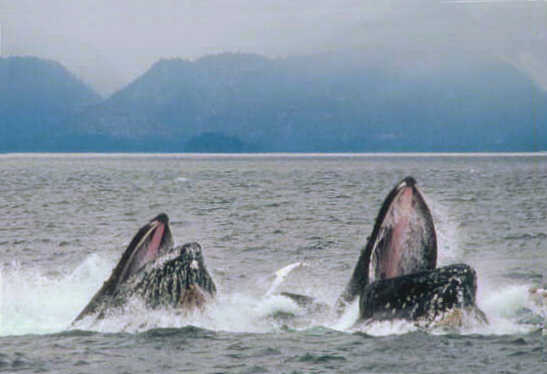
A pair of humpback whales, a species of rorqual, lunge feeding

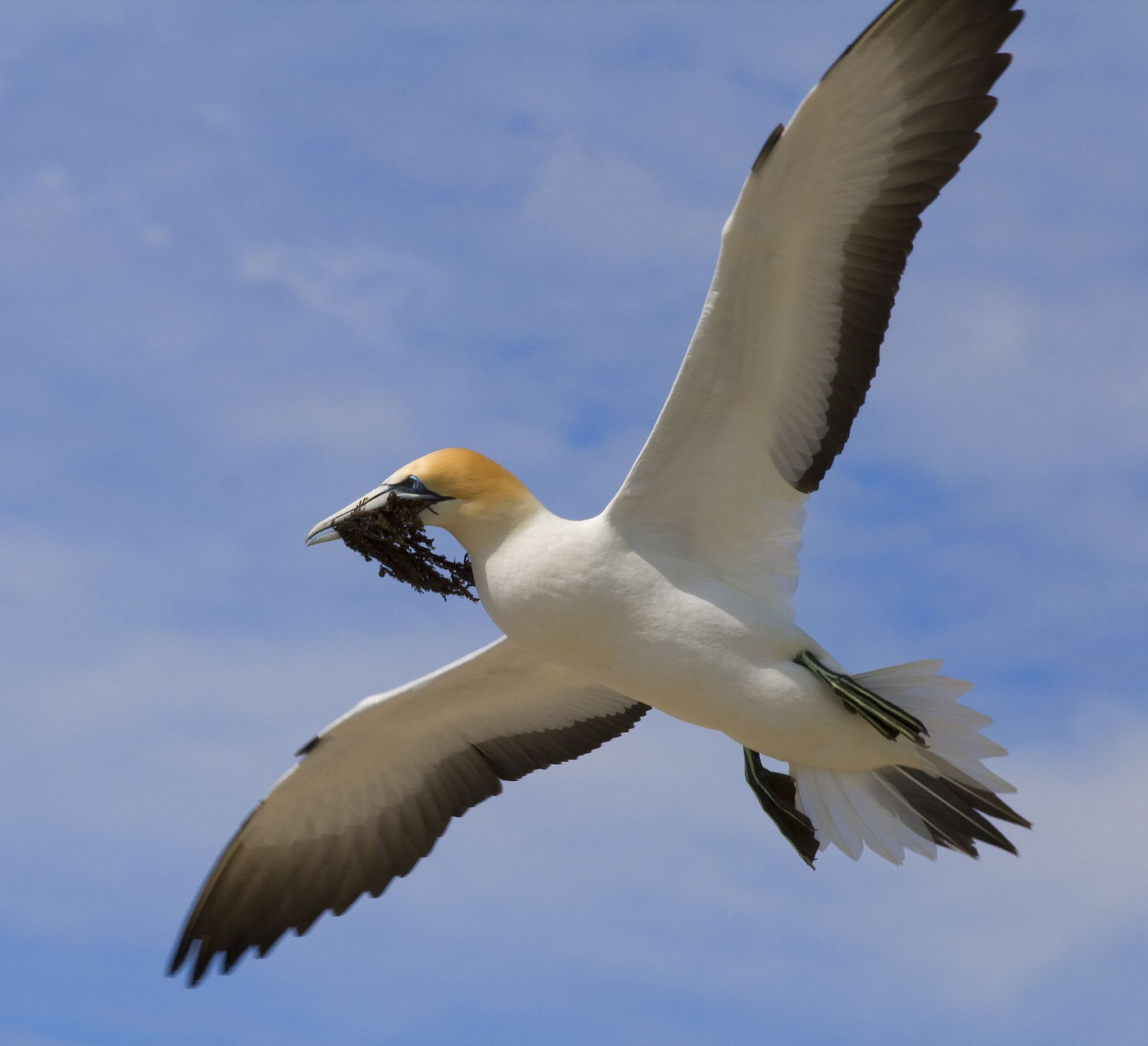
Gannets "divebomb" at high speed.

== How fish school ==
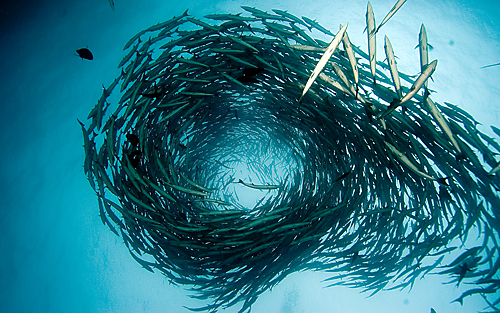
A "tornado" of schooling barracudas

Fish schools swim in disciplined phalanxes, with some species, such as herrings, able to stream up and down at impressive speeds, twisting this way and that, and making startling changes in the shape of the school, without collisions. It is as if their motions are choreographed, though they are not. There must be very fast response systems to allow the fish to do this. Young fish practice schooling techniques in pairs, and then in larger groups as their techniques and senses mature. The schooling behaviour develops instinctively and is not learned from older fish. To school the way they do, fish require sensory systems which can respond with great speed to small changes in their position relative to their neighbour. Most schools lose their schooling abilities after dark, and just shoal. This indicates that vision is important to schooling. The importance of vision is also indicated by the behaviour of fish who have been temporarily blinded. Schooling species have eyes on the sides of their heads, which means they can easily see their neighbours. Also, schooling species often have "schooling marks" on their shoulders or the base of their tails, or visually prominent stripes, which provide reference marks when schooling, similar in function to passive markers in artificial motion capture. However, fish without these markers will still engage in schooling behaviour, though perhaps not as efficiently.

Other senses are also used. Pheromones or sound may also play a part but supporting evidence has not been found so far. The lateral line is a line running along each side of the fish from the gill covers to the base of the tail. In laboratory experiments the lateral lines of schooling fish have been removed. They swam closer, leading to a theory that the lateral lines provide additional stimuli input when the fish get too close. The lateral-line system is very sensitive to changes in water currents and vibration in the water. It uses receptors called neuromasts, each of which is composed of a group of hair cells. The hairs are surrounded by a protruding jelly-like cupula, typically 0.1 to 0.2 mm long. The hair cells in the lateral line are similar to the hair cells inside the vertebrate inner ear, indicating that the lateral line and the inner ear share a common origin.

== Describing shoal structure ==
It is difficult to observe and describe the three dimensional structure of real world fish shoals because of the large number of fish involved. Techniques include the use of recent advances in fisheries acoustics.

Parameters defining a fish shoal include:

- Shoal size – The number of fish in the shoal. A remote sensing technique has been used near the edge of the continental shelf off the east coast of North America to take images of fish shoals. The shoals – most likely made up of Atlantic herring, scup, hake, and black sea bass – were said to contain "tens of millions" of fish and stretched for "many kilometers".
- Density – The density of a fish shoal is the number of fish divided by the volume occupied by the shoal. Density is not necessarily a constant throughout the group. Fish in schools typically have a density of about one fish per cube of body length.
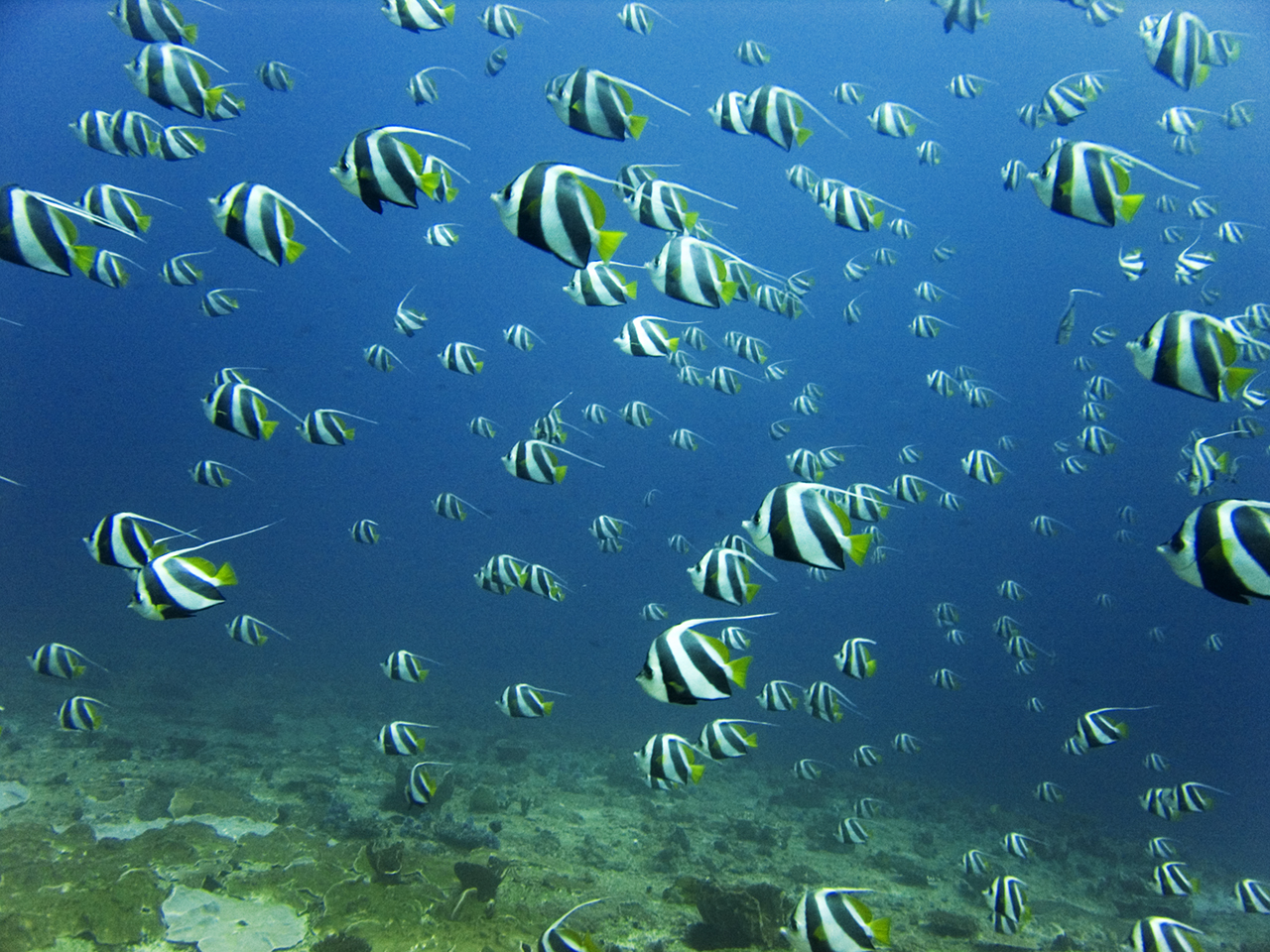
Low density

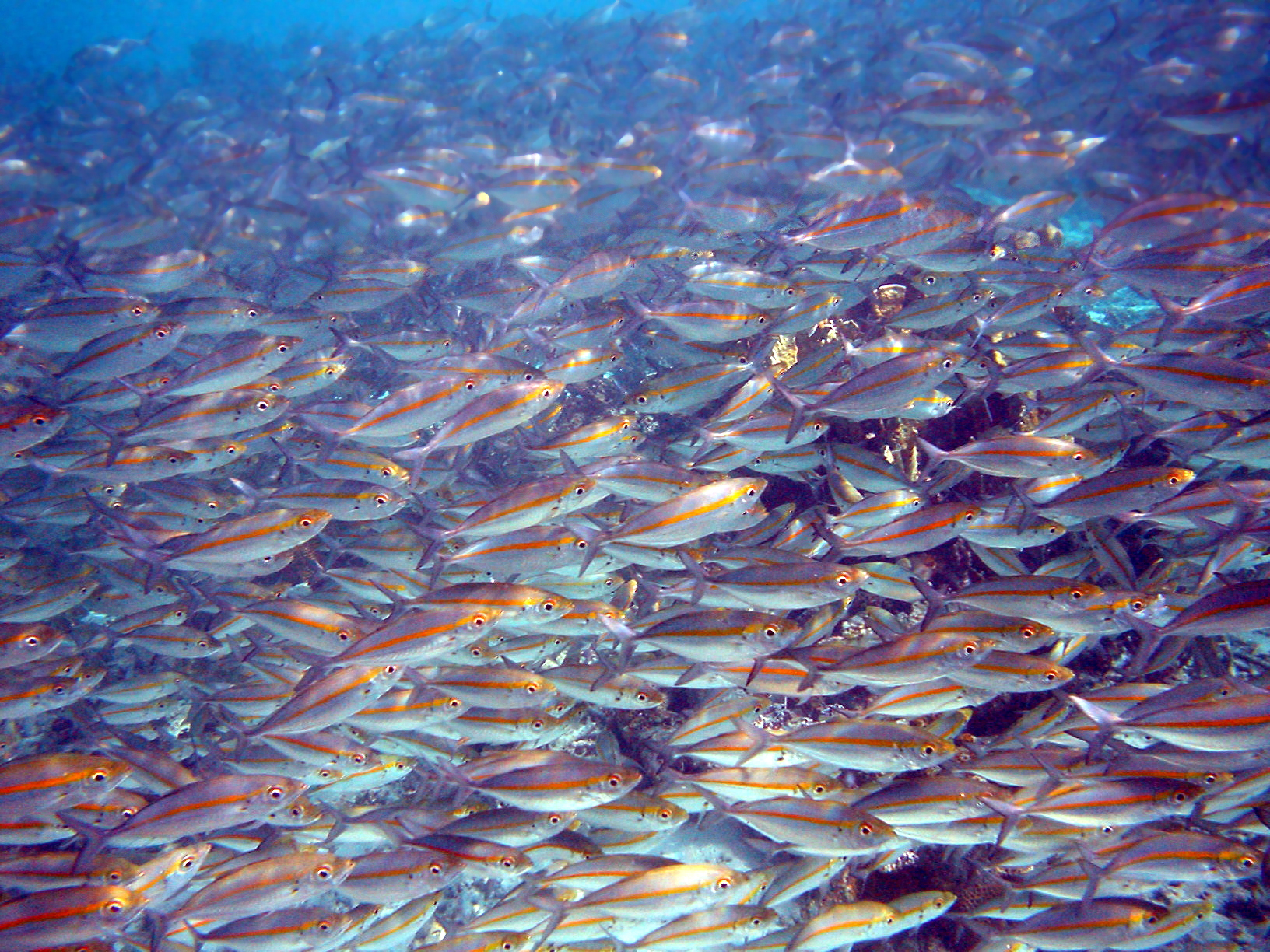
High density

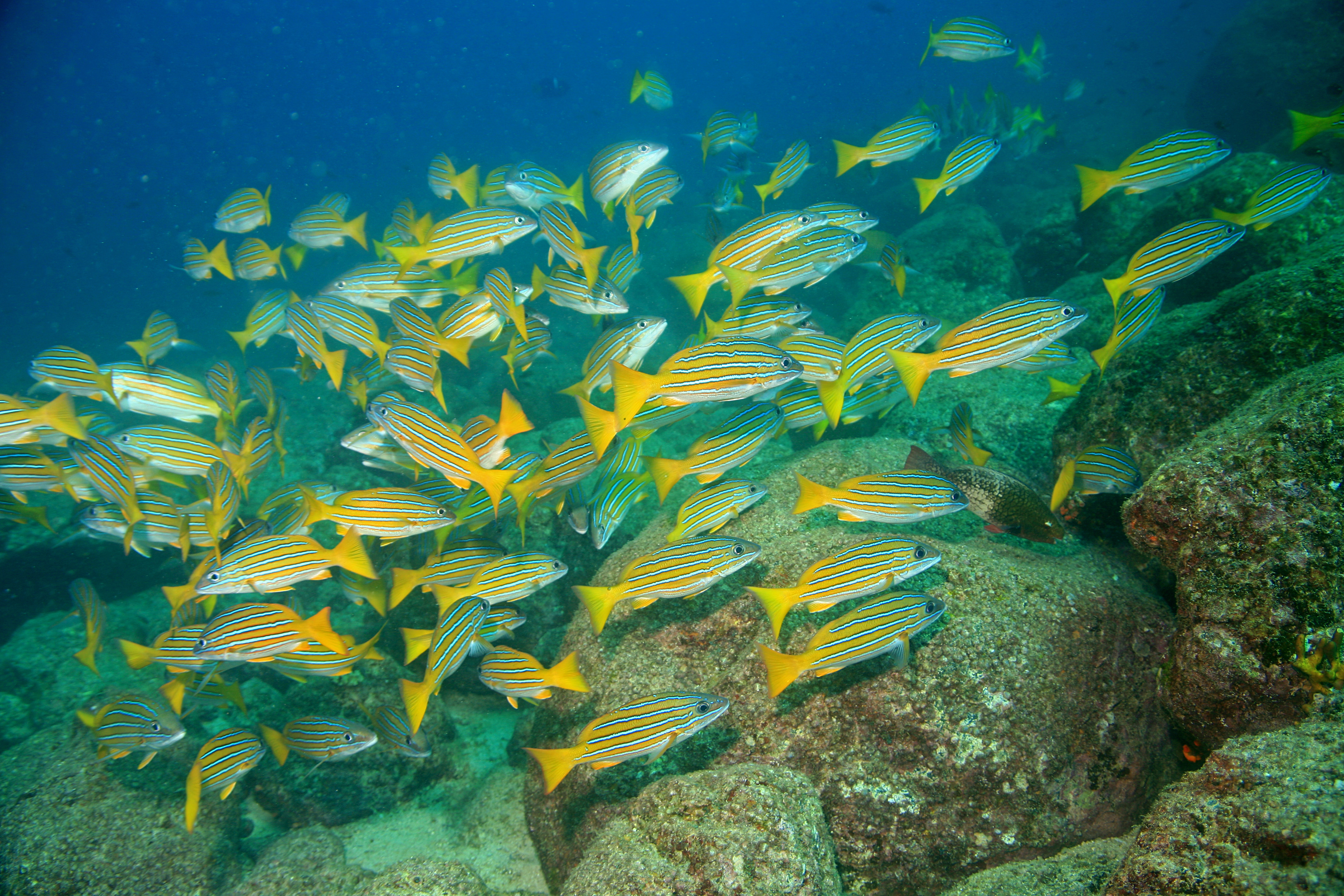
Low polarity

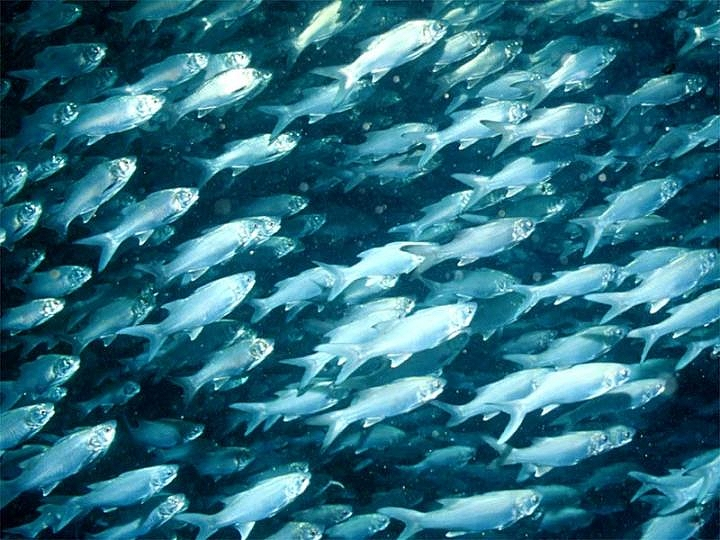
High polarity
- Polarity – The group polarity describes the extent to which the fish are all pointing in the same direction. In order to determine this parameter, the average orientation of all animals in the group is determined. For each animal, the angular difference between its orientation and the group orientation is then found. The group polarity is the average of these differences.
- Nearest neighbour distance – The nearest neighbour distance (NND) describes the distance between the centroid of one fish (the focal fish) and the centroid of the fish nearest to the focal fish. This parameter can be found for each fish in an aggregation and then averaged. Care must be taken to account for the fish located at the edge of a fish aggregation, since these fish have no neighbour in one direction. The NND is also related to the packing density. For schooling fish the NND is usually between one-half and one body length.
- Nearest neighbour position – In a polar coordinate system, the nearest neighbour position describes the angle and distance of the nearest neighbour to a focal fish.
- Packing fraction – The packing fraction is a parameter borrowed from physics to define the organization (or state i.e. solid, liquid, or gas) of 3D fish groups. It is an alternative measure to density. In this parameter, the aggregation is idealized as an ensemble of solid spheres, with each fish at the center of a sphere. The packing fraction is defined as the ratio of the total volume occupied by all individual spheres divided by the global volume of the aggregation. Values range from zero to one, where a small packing fraction represents a dilute system like a gas.
- Integrated conditional density – This parameter measures the density at various length scales and therefore describes the homogeneity of density throughout an animal group.
- Pair distribution function – This parameter is usually used in physics to characterize the degree of spatial order in a system of particles. It also describes the density, but this measure describes the density at a distance away from a given point. Cavagna et al. found that flocks of starlings exhibited more structure than a gas but less than a liquid.

== Modelling school behaviour ==
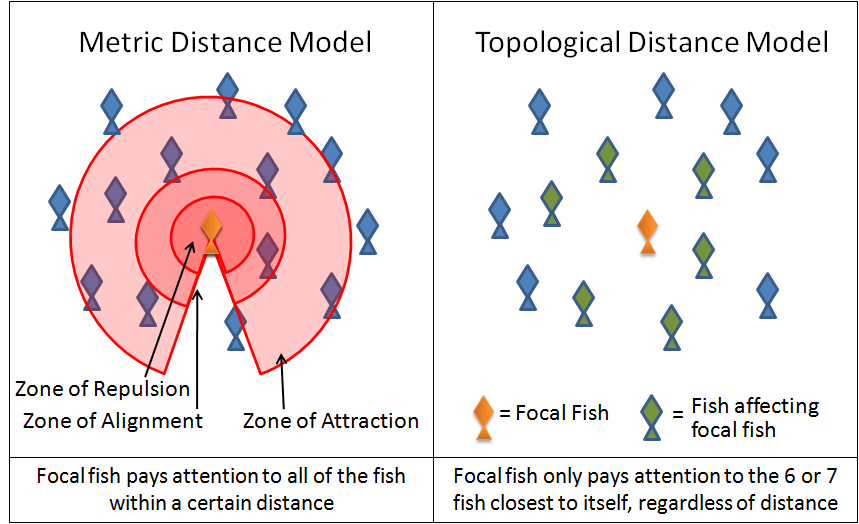
↑ Diagram illustrating the difference between metric distance and topological distance in reference to fish schools

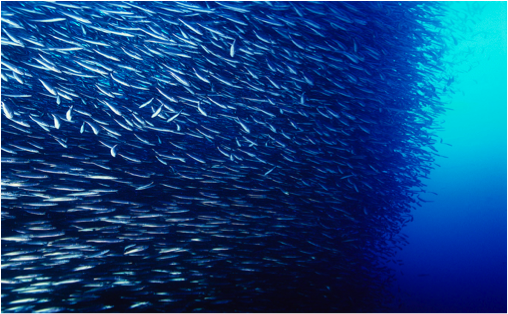
↑ Large schools, like this one, still follow positional evaluation and are regulated by the same density and volume characteristics as smaller schools.

Boids simulation – needs Java

Interactive simulation of self-propelled particles – needs Java

=== Mathematical models ===
The observational approach is complemented by the mathematical modelling of schools. The most common mathematical models of schools instruct the individual animals to follow three rules:

1. Move in the same direction as your neighbour
2. Remain close to your neighbours
3. Avoid collisions with your neighbours

An example of such a simulation is the boids program created by Craig Reynolds in 1986. Another is the self-propelled particle model introduced by Vicsek et al. in 1995 Many current models use variations on these rules. For instance, many models implement these three rules through layered zones around each fish.

1. In the zone of repulsion very close to the fish, the focal fish will seek to distance itself from its neighbours in order to avoid a collision.
2. In the slightly further away zone of alignment, a focal fish will seek to align its direction of motion with its neighbours.
3. In the outmost zone of attraction, which extends as far away from the focal fish as it is able to sense, the focal fish will seek to move towards a neighbour.

The shape of these zones will necessarily be affected by the sensory capabilities of the fish. Fish rely on both vision and on hydrodynamic signals relayed through its lateral line. Antarctic krill rely on vision and on hydrodynamic signals relayed through its antennae.

In a masters thesis published in 2008, Moshi Charnell produced schooling behaviour without using the alignment matching component of an individual's behaviour. His model reduces the three basic rules to the following two rules:

1. Remain close to your neighbours
2. Avoid collisions with your neighbours

In a paper published in 2009, researchers from Iceland recount their application of an interacting particle model to the capelin stock around Iceland, successfully predicting the spawning migration route for 2008.

=== Evolutionary models ===
In order to gain insight into why animals evolve swarming behaviour, scientists have turned to evolutionary models that simulate populations of evolving animals. Typically these studies use a genetic algorithm to simulate evolution over many generations in the model. These studies have investigated a number of hypotheses explaining why animals evolve swarming behaviour, such as the selfish herd theory, the predator confusion effect, the dilution effect, and the many eyes theory.

== Mapping the formation of schools ==
In 2009, building on recent advances in acoustic imaging, a group of MIT researchers observed for "the first time the formation and subsequent migration of a huge shoal of fish." The results provide the first field confirmation of general theories about how large groups behave, from locust swarms to bird flocks.

The researchers imaged spawning Atlantic herring off Georges Bank. They found that the fish come together from deeper water in the evening, shoaling in a disordered way. A chain reaction triggers when the population density reaches a critical value, like an audience wave travelling around a sport stadium. A rapid transition then occurs, and the fish become highly polarised and synchronized in the manner of schooling fish. After the transition, the schools start migrating, extending up to 40 kilometres (25 miles) across the ocean, to shallow parts of the bank. There they spawn during the night. In the morning, the fish school back to deeper water again and then disband. Small groups of leaders were also discovered that significantly influenced much larger groups.

== Leadership and decision-making ==
Fish schools are faced with decisions they must make if they are to remain together. For example, a decision might be which direction to swim when confronted by a predator, which areas to stop and forage, or when and where to migrate.

Quorum sensing can function as a collective decision-making process in any decentralised system. A quorum response has been defined as "a steep increase in the probability of group members performing a given behaviour once a threshold minimum number of their group mates already performing that behaviour is exceeded". A recent investigation showed that small groups of fish used consensus decision-making when deciding which fish model to follow. The fish did this by a simple quorum rule such that individuals watched the decisions of others before making their own decisions. This technique generally resulted in the 'correct' decision but occasionally cascaded into the 'incorrect' decision. In addition, as the group size increased, the fish made more accurate decisions in following the more attractive fish model. Consensus decision-making, a form of collective intelligence, thus effectively uses information from multiple sources to generally reach the correct conclusion. Such behaviour has also been demonstrated in the shoaling behaviour of threespine sticklebacks.

Other open questions of shoaling behaviour include identifying which individuals are responsible for the direction of shoal movement. Observations on the foraging behaviour of captive golden shiner (a kind of minnow) found they formed shoals which were led by a small number of experienced individuals who knew when and where food was available. If all golden shiners in a shoal have similar knowledge of food availability, there are a few individuals that still emerge as natural leaders (being at the front more often) and behavioural tests suggest they are naturally bolder. Smaller golden shiners appear more willing than larger ones to be near the front of the shoal, perhaps because they are hungrier. Observations on the common roach have shown that food-deprived individuals tend to be at the front of a shoal, where they obtain more food but where they may also be more vulnerable to ambush predators. Individuals that are wary of predation tend to seek more central positions within shoals.

== Shoal choice ==
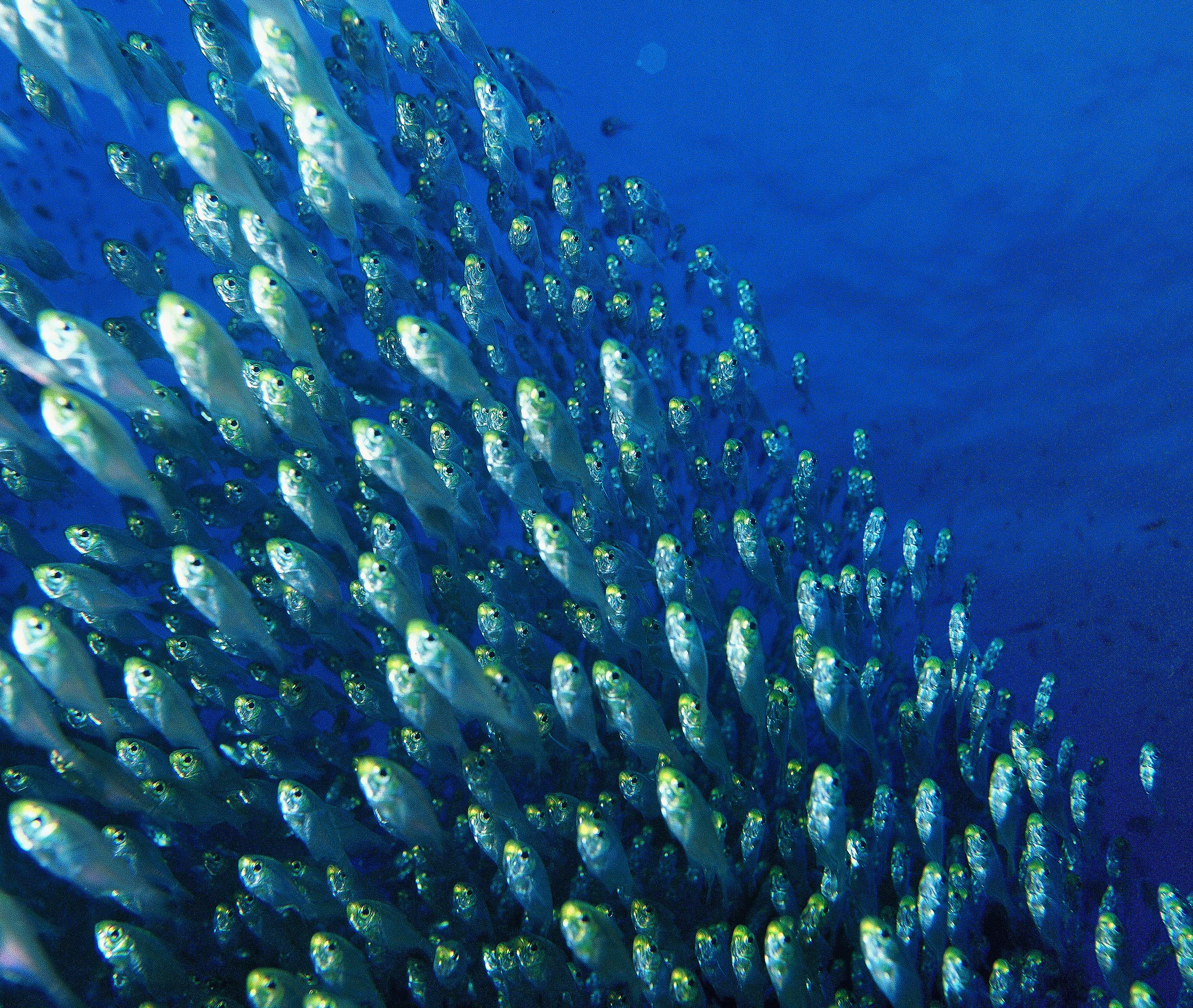
Fish, such as these sweepers, usually prefer to join larger schools which contain members of their own species matching their own size.

Experimental studies of shoal preference are relatively easy to perform. An aquarium containing a choosing fish is sandwiched between two aquaria containing different shoals, and the choosing fish is assumed to spend more time next to the shoal it prefers. Studies of this kind have identified several factors important for shoal preference.

Fish generally prefer larger shoals. This makes sense, as larger shoal usually provide better protection against predators. Indeed, the preference for larger shoals seems stronger when predators are nearby, or in species that rely more on shoaling than body armour against predation. Larger shoals may also find food faster, though that food would have to be shared amongst more individuals. Competition may mean that hungry individuals might prefer smaller shoals or exhibit a lesser preference for very large shoals, as shown in sticklebacks.

Fish prefer to shoal with their own species. Sometimes, several species may become mingled in one shoal, but when a predator is presented to such shoals, the fish reorganize themselves so that each individual ends up being closer to members of its own species.

Fish tend to prefer shoals made up of individuals that match their own size. This makes sense as predators have an easier time catching individuals that stand out in a shoal. Some fish may even prefer shoals of another species if this means a better match in current body size. As for shoal size however, hunger can affect the preference for similarly sized fish; large fish, for example, might prefer to associate with smaller ones because of the competitive advantage they will gain over these shoalmates. In golden shiner, large satiated fish prefer to associate with other large individuals, but hungry ones prefer smaller shoalmates.

Fish prefer to shoal with individuals with which the choosing fish is already familiar. This has been demonstrated in guppies, threespine stickleback, banded killifish, the surfperch Embiotoca jacksoni, Mexican tetra, and various minnows. A study with the White Cloud Mountain minnow has also found that choosing fish prefer to shoal with individuals that have consumed the same diet as themselves.

Sticklebacks and killifish have been shown to prefer shoals made up of healthy individuals over parasitized ones, on the basis of visual signs of parasitism and abnormal behaviour by the parasitized fish. Zebrafish prefer shoals that consist of well-fed (greater stomach width) fish over food-deprived ones.

Threespine stickleback prefer to join a shoal made up of bold individuals rather than shy ones. Angelfish prefer shoals made up of subordinate rather than dominant individuals. European minnow can discriminate between shoals composed of good versus poor competitors, even in the absence of obvious cues such as differences in aggressiveness, size, or feeding rate; they prefer to associate with the poor competitors. All of this suggests a strategy to obtain food, as bolder individuals should be more likely to find food, while subordinates would offer less competition for the discovered food.

Fish prefer to join shoals that are actively feeding. Golden shiner can also detect the anticipatory activity of shoals that expect to be fed soon, and preferentially join such shoals. Zebrafish also choose shoals that are more active.

== Commercial fishing ==
The schooling behaviour of fish is exploited on an industrial scale by the commercial fishing industry. Huge purse seiner vessels use spotter planes to locate schooling fish, such as tuna, cod, mackerel and forage fish. They can capture huge schools by rapidly encircling them with purse seine nets with the help of fast auxiliary boats and sophisticated sonar, which can track the shape of the shoal.

== Further examples ==
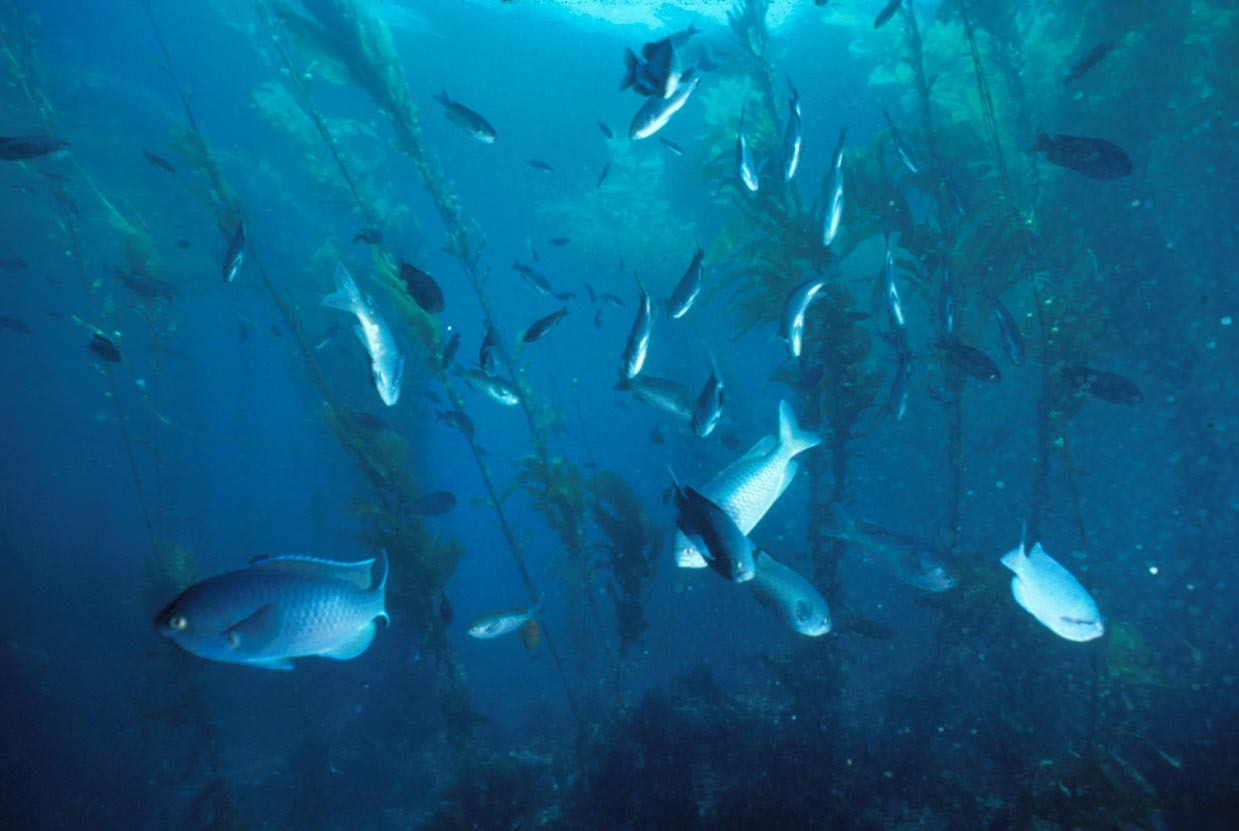
School of blacksmiths being cleaned by parasite-eating fish

Blacksmith fish live in loose shoals. They have a symbiotic relationship with the parasite-eating senorita fish. When they encounter a shoal of senorita fish, they stop and form a tight ball and hang upside down (pictured), each fish waiting its turn to be cleaned. The senorita fish pick dead tissues and external parasites, like parasitic copecods and isocods, from the skin of other fishes.

Some shoals engage in mobbing behaviour. For example, bluegills form large nesting colonies and sometimes attack snapping turtles. This may function to advertise their presence, drive the predator from the area, or aid in cultural transmission of predator recognition.

Piranha have a reputation as fearless fish that hunt in ferocious packs. However, recent research, which "started off with the premise that they school as a means of cooperative hunting", discovered that they were in fact rather fearful fish, like other fish, which schooled for protection from their predators, such as cormorants, caimans and dolphins. Piranhas are "basically like regular fish with large teeth".

Humboldt squid are large carnivorous marine invertebrates that move in schools of up to 1,200 individuals. They swim at speeds of up to 24 kilometres per hour (15 mph or 13 kn) propelled by water ejected through a siphon and by two triangular fins. Their tentacles bear suckers lined with sharp teeth with which they grasp prey and drag it towards a large, sharp beak. During the day the Humboldt squid behave similar to mesopelagic fish, living at depths of 200 to 700 m (660 to 2,300 ft). Electronic tagging has shown that they also undergo diel vertical migrations which bring them closer to the surface from dusk to dawn. They hunt near the surface at night, taking advantage of the dark to use their keen vision to feed on more plentiful prey. The squid feed primarily on small fish, crustaceans, cephalopods, and copepod, and hunt for their prey in a cooperative fashion, the first observation of such behaviour in invertebrates. The Humboldt squid is also known to quickly devour larger prey when cooperatively hunting in groups. Humboldt squid are known for their speed in feasting on hooked fish, sharks, and squid, even from their own species and shoal, and have been known to attack fishermen and divers.

== See also ==
Schooling bigeye trevally

- Allee effect
- Antipredator adaptation
- Cellular automaton
- Krill#Swarming
- Lek (mating arena)
- Mobile Bay jubilee
- Optimal foraging theory
- Predator satiation
- Schreckstoff
- The Blue Planet
- The Shoals of Herring
