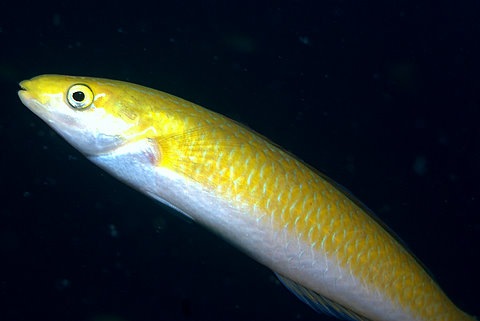

Conservation status
- Least Concern (IUCN 3.1)

Scientific classification
- Kingdom: Animalia
- Phylum: Chordata
- Class: Actinopterygii
- Order: Labriformes
- Family: Labridae
- Genus: Halichoeres
- Species: H. californicus

Binomial name
- Halichoeres californicus Günther, 1861

Synonyms
- Oxyjulis californica (Günther, 1861); Julis modestus Girard, 1854

= Halichoeres californicus =

Species of fish

Halichoeres californicus is a species of wrasse native to the eastern Pacific Ocean along the coasts of California and Baja California. Its distribution extends from Salt Point in Sonoma County, California, to southern central Baja California, near Cedros Island. It is a very common species; its common name in Spanish is señorita.

This fish can grow to 25 cm (9.8 in) in total length. Its body is fusiform, frequently described as "cigar-shaped". It is brown or shiny bronze dorsally and orange on its sides, becoming paler ventrally. The base of the tail fin is mostly covered with a large black or chocolate brown spot. The mouth is small and it has protruding "buck teeth" which it uses to scrape tiny invertebrate prey items off of kelp.

This fish lives in near-coastal marine habitats, especially kelp forests and reefs. It has been observed at depths of 73 m (240 ft), but it generally lives at 20 m (66 ft) or less. It may cruise in a small school, but if threatened, it often retreats to the bottom, digging into the substrate to hide. It also rests on the bottom at night, burrowing in backwards so only its head sticks out of the substrate.

The diet of the fish is composed of invertebrates, including marine worms, bryozoans, crustaceans, dove snails, limpets, fish larvae, and squid. It may consume small amounts of seaweed. It also feeds on the ectoparasites of other fish. The señorita is a cleaner wrasse, a fish that grooms the parasites and other materials off the bodies of other fish. It may remove and eat ectoparasites such as bacteria, copepods, and isopods. Parasites can constitute around half its total food intake. Sometimes when the señorita begins to clean one of its clients, a crowd of other fish will gather around to receive the service. Species that seek the señorita for a grooming include the bat ray (Myliobatis californica), giant sea bass (Stereolepis gigas), kelp bass (Paralabrax clathratus), jacksmelt (Atherinopsis californiensis), topsmelt (Atherinops affinis), sargo (Diplodus sargus), blacksmith (Chromis punctipinnis), garibaldi (Hypsypops rubicundus), opaleye (Girella nigricans), halfmoon (Medialuna californiensis), and mola (Mola mola). The other fish may solicit the cleaning with their behavior. The garibaldi extends its gill slits to give the señorita access to parasites on its gills. The blacksmith points its head down to encourage the cleaner, and many blacksmith at a time may mob it, competing for its attention. They may even block its escape if it tries to leave the scene. The opaleye is usually constantly swimming, but it will stop and hold still if it meets a señorita. The kelp bass, a predator of small fish, will often refrain from eating the señorita, and let it clean. While the señorita will often clean large, predatory fish, it is not always safe. It has been observed in the diet of the kelp bass, the bocaccio (Sebastes paucispinis), and the starry rockfish (S. constellatus), but it is not consumed as often as would be expected, considering its frequent close contact with predators. It might be unpalatable. Predators that do eat the fish include Brandt's cormorant (Phalacrocorax penicillatus) and the California sea lion (Zalophus californianus).

The reproductive biology of this fish is not well known. Some sources suggest it may be a protogynous hermaphrodite, with the female able to change sex and become male, while others doubt this occurs in this species. Spawning occurs in May through August. The eggs are pelagic, floating suspended in the water.

The fish tends to return to favorite locations; in one experiment, señoritas were caught and then released a distance away, and most found their way back to their original home ranges.

Fishermen generally do not seek this species as quarry, and it can be an annoyance when it steals bait off hooks. While technically edible, it is not valuable as a food fish.
