= SR =

SR or sr may refer to:

== Arts and entertainment ==
- Science Reporter, a magazine
- "Sr.", a 2022 film featuring Roberts Downey Jr. and Sr.

== Businesses and organizations ==
=== Politics ===
- Socialist Revolutionary Party, Russia, 1902–1941
- A Just Russia (Spravedlivaya Rossiya), a political party formed in 2006

=== Transport ===
- Southern Railway (UK)
- Southern Railway (U.S.)
- Swissair (IATA airline code SR)
- Southern Railway zone, India
- SR Corporation, a South Korean rail operator

=== Other businesses and organizations ===
- Sørvágs Róðrarfelag, a Faroese rowing association
- Saarländischer Rundfunk, a German broadcaster
- Sveriges Radio, a Swedish broadcaster

== Honorifics ==
- Senior (Sr.), a generational title suffix to a man's name
- Religious sister (Sr.), in Catholicism

== Places ==
- Slovak Republic (Slovak: Slovenská republika), the official name of Slovakia
- Suriname (ISO 3166-1 country code SR)
- West Sulawesi (ISO 3166-2:ID province code SR), a province of Indonesia

== Science and technology ==
=== Biology and medicine ===
- SR protein, involved in RNA splicing
- Sarcoplasmic reticulum, a structure found within muscle cells
- Sustained release, in medicine

=== Chemistry and physics ===
- Steradian (symbol: sr), the SI unit of solid angle
- Strontium (symbol: Sr), a chemical element

=== Computing and electronics ===
- .sr, the Internet top-level domain for Suriname
- SR flip-flop circuit, an electronic logic device
- SR programming language
- Segment routing, a form of computer networking
- Slew rate, the maximum rate of change of electrical signals
- Sound reinforcement, a system to make sounds louder
- Student Robotics, a robot-building competition
- Surround Right (SR), a speaker on a 5.1 surround sound setup

=== Transport ===
- Codename of the 1992 to 2002 Dodge Viper
- Nissan SR engine
- Manx SR and SR2, 1970 US kit cars
- State Route
- Rockaway Park Shuttle in New York City, sometimes signed in documents as S^{R}

== Other uses ==
- Strike rate (s/r), a statistic in cricket
- Saudi riyal (currency symbol: SR), the currency of Saudi Arabia
- Serbian language (ISO-639-1 language code: sr)
- Slot receiver, a position in American football
- Special reconnaissance, a military tactic
  - United States Air Force Special Reconnaissance
- Sudurpaschim Royals, a professional Twenty20 cricket franchise representing Sudurpashchim Province, Nepal in the Nepal Premier League

== See also ==
- SR-25, a rifle
- Lockheed SR-71 Blackbird, an aircraft
- Cirrus SR20 and Cirrus SR22, a monoplane
- Socialist Republic, as in USSR, ASSR, RSFSR, etc.
- Gibbs SR, a brand of toothpaste
- Senior (disambiguation)
