= Senior (name) =

Senior is a surname and occasional given name. Notable people with the name include:

== Surname ==
- Abraham Senior (1412–1493), last crown Sephardi rabbi of Castile
- Anna Senior (born 1941), Australian costume designer
- Brian Senior (born 1953), British bridge player
- Clarence Senior (1903–1974), American socialist political activist
- Innes Senior (born 2000), English-born professional rugby league footballer
- John Senior (born 1960), British Army major
- John L. Senior (1879–1946), American sports administrator
- Julio Ximenes Senior (1901–1975), Brazilian scientist and Army general
- Justin Senior (born 1994), American football player
- Keith Senior (born 1976), English rugby league player
- Louis Senior (born 2000), English-born professional rugby league footballer
- Moira Senior (born 1976), field hockey player from New Zealand
- Nadine Senior (1931–2016), British dance educator
- Nassau William Senior (1790–1864), English economist
- Omer Senior (born 2003), Israeli association footballer (soccer player)
- Peter Senior (born 1959), Australian golfer
- Robert Senior (born 1964), British businessperson
- Russell Senior (born 1961), British musician and record producer
- Stephen Senior, Welsh politician
- Thomas B. A. Senior (1928–2017), British-American electrical engineer and professor at University of Michigan

== Given name ==
- Senior Sachs (1816–1892), Russo-French Hebrew scholar
