= SPS =

SPS may refer to:

== Law and government ==
- Agreement on the Application of Sanitary and Phytosanitary Measures of the WTO
- NATO Science for Peace and Security
- Single Payment Scheme, an EU agricultural subsidy
- The Standard Procurement System, for the US Department of Defense
- Somali Postal Service
- Staff and Personnel Support Branch, part of the British Army Adjutant General's Corps
- Unofficial ship prefix for Spanish naval warships (Spanish Ship)

=== Police and prisons ===
- Saskatoon Police Service, Saskatoon, Saskatchewan
- Scottish Prison Service
- Singapore Prison Service, a government agency of the Government of Singapore under the hierarchy of the Ministry of Home Affairs
- Station police sergeant or station sergeant, former UK police rank
- State Police Services (India)
- Surrey Police Service, British Columbia, Canada

== Organisations ==
- Sahara Press Service, of the Sahrawi Arab Democratic Republic
- Sierra Peaks Section
- SPS Commerce
- SPS Technologies, Inc., acquired by Precision Castparts Corp.
- Sussex Piscatorial Society, a fishing club in the UK
- Swiss Society of Proteomics, of Life Sciences Switzerland

=== Education ===
- New York University School of Professional Studies
- Sadiq Public School, a school in Bahawalpur, Punjab, Pakistan
- Saint Paul Seminary, a Catholic seminary in St. Paul, Minnesota, US
- Social and Political Sciences, of the University of Cambridge, UK
- Society of Physics Students
- Springfield Public Schools (Missouri), school district, US
- St. Patrick's Higher Secondary School, Asansol, India
- St. Paul's School (disambiguation), various schools
- Stromness Primary School, a primary school in Stromness, Orkney

=== Political parties ===
- Socialist Party of Serbia (Socijalistička partija Srbije), a political party in Serbia
- Union of Right Forces (Soyuz pravykh sil), a former political party in Russia
- Soy Porque Somos, Colombian left-wing political movement founded in 2021

=== Religion ===
- Saint Patrick’s Society for the Foreign Missions, Ireland, post-nominal
- Society for Pentecostal Studies

== Science and technology ==
- Sodium polyanethol sulfonate, an anticoagulant used in blood culture media
- Solanapyrone synthase, an enzyme
- Spark plasma sintering
- Special weather statement, US
- Stand-alone power system, an off-the-grid electricity system
- Standard positioning service, a Global Positioning System feature
- Sucrose-phosphate synthase, a plant enzyme involved in sucrose biosynthesis
- Super Proton Synchrotron, a particle accelerator at CERN
- Samples per second

=== Computing ===
- Shell Processing Support, a file format for seismic data
- IBM 1401 Symbolic Programming System and IBM 1620/1710 Symbolic Programming System, assemblers

=== Medicine and psychology ===
- Sensory processing sensitivity, the defining personality trait of Highly Sensitive Persons (HSPs)
- Serrated polyposis syndrome, a disorder characterized by the appearance of serrated polyps in the colon
- Sterile processing service
- Stiff-person syndrome, a rare neurologic disorder
- Syntactic positive shift, a peak in brain activity

=== Military and space ===
- Service propulsion system in the Apollo service module
- Solar power satellite, to beam power to Earth
- Side protection system or torpedo belt of a warship
- SR-1 Vektor (Samozaryadnyj Pistolet Serdjukova – Serdyukov Self-loading pistol)

== Transportation ==
- Spokane, Portland and Seattle Railway, a defunct railroad in the United States
- Wichita Falls Municipal Airport (IATA airport code)

== Other uses ==
- Abbreviation of San Pedro Sula, second largest city in Honduras.
- Sony Imaging Pro Support, for photographers
- SPS (Mongolia), a TV channel
- Sam Petrevski-Seton, an Australian rules footballer
- "S.P.S.", a song by Kasabian from the album 48:13

== See also ==
- SPs
- SPSS
- SP (disambiguation)
