= Raji cell =

Human cell line

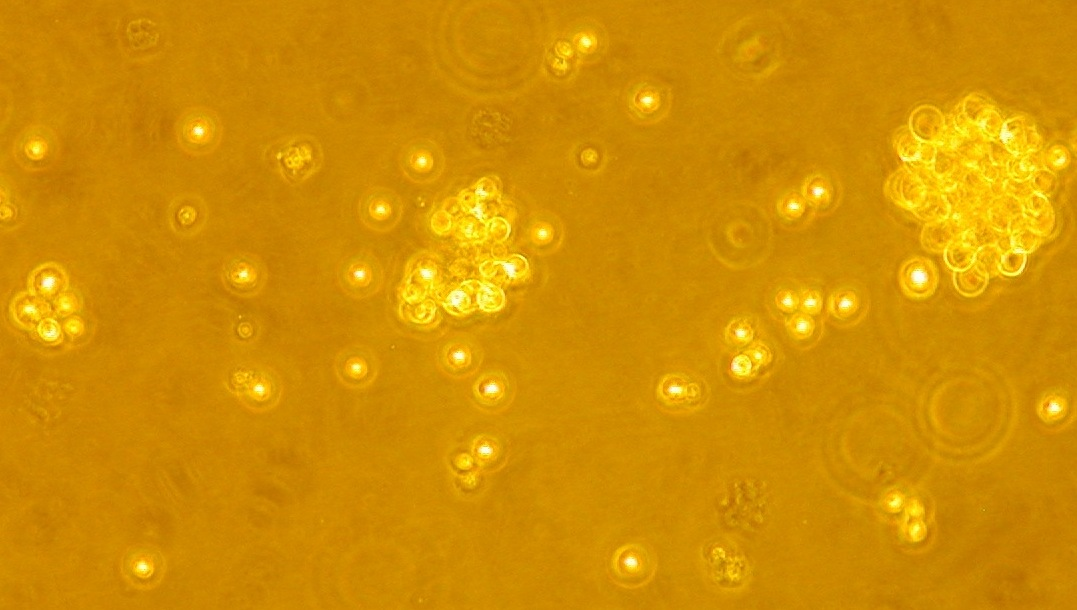
Raji cell culture.

Raji is the first continuous human cell line of hematopoietic origin. The Raji cell line is widely used as a transfection host.

Raji cells were derived from the B-lymphocytes of an 11-year-old Nigerian Burkitt lymphoma male patient in 1963 by R.J.V. Pulvertaft and was further worked on by B.O. Osunkoya (University College Hospital, Ibadan, Nigeria).

The Raji cell line is categorized as lymphoblast-like. The culture medium used to grow Raji cells is RPMI supplemented with serum. Some characteristics of Raji cells include a lack of differentiation, illustrated by the formation of large aggregations of hundreds of individual cells. The cells are relatively small in diameter (5-8 μm), have irregular indented nuclei, and almost extensive cytoplasm with free ribosomes which tend to clump. Raji cells grow as single, non-motile, free-floating (non-adhesion) individuals or doublets to glass. Some cells look elongated, pear-shaped with larger, multinucleate, round cells.

The Raji cell line produces an unusual strain of Epstein–Barr virus, which both transforms cord blood lymphocytes and induces early antigens in the cells. Translocations between chromosomes 8 and 22 have occurred in all three variations of the Raji cell line, but some cells synthesize immunoglobulin M with light chains of the kappa type, in contrast to the usual concordance between a translocation involving chromosome 22 and lambda chain synthesis. Both kappa genes and one lambda gene are rearranged. These findings indicate either that translocation may occur as a separate event from immunoglobulin gene rearrangement or that the proposed hierarchical sequence of immunoglobulin gene rearrangements is not always adhered to. The data also imply that in cells containing a translocation between the long arm of chromosome 8 and a chromosome bearing an immunoglobulin gene, alteration of cellular myc expression may occur regardless of the immunoglobulin gene that is expressed. The cells grow in a suspension, are diploid, and are lymphoblastoid in morphology.
