= SP+ =

SP+ could refer to:

- Samajwadi Alliance, a political alliance in India in the 2022 Uttar Pradesh Legislative Assembly election
- SP Plus Corporation, an American company that provides parking lot services

== See also ==
- SP (disambiguation)
