= Infectious diseases (medical specialty) =

Medical specialty dealing with the diagnosis, control and treatment of infections

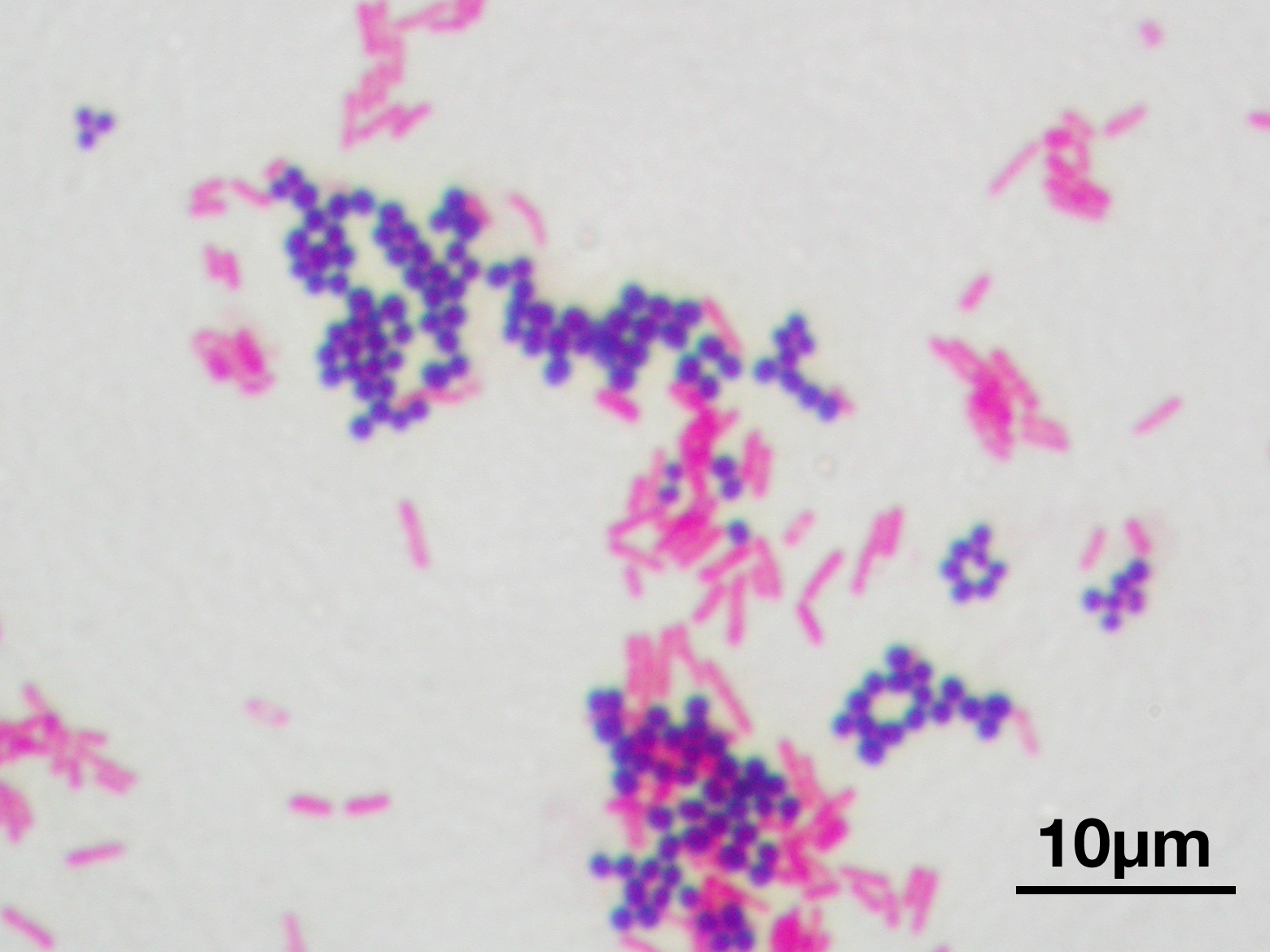
- Gram stain of bacteria: a test frequently performed in infectiology to distinguish between different types of bacteria.
- Synonym: Infectiology, infectious medicine, ID
- Significant diseases: Infections, e.g. osteomyelitis, pneumonia, tuberculosis, leprosy, COVID-19, HIV/AIDS, influenza, also public health issues e.g. epidemics, antimicrobial resistance, bioterrorism
- Significant tests: Gram staining, microbiological cultures (including blood cultures), serological tests, genotyping, polymerase chain reaction (PCR), medical imaging
- Specialist: Infectious diseases specialist, Infectiologist, Infectionist
- Glossary: Glossary of medicine

Infectious diseases (ID), also known as infectiology, is a medical specialty dealing with the diagnosis and treatment of infections. An infectious diseases specialist's practice consists of managing nosocomial (healthcare-acquired) infections or community-acquired infections. An ID specialist investigates and determines the cause of a disease (bacteria, virus, parasite, fungus or prions). Once the cause is known, an ID specialist can run various tests to determine the most effective drug to treat the disease. While infectious diseases have always been around, the infectious disease specialty did not exist until the late 1900s after scientists and physicians in the 19th century paved the way with research on the sources of infectious disease and the development of vaccines.

== Scope ==
Infectious diseases specialists typically serve as consultants to other physicians in cases of complex infections, and often manage patients with HIV/AIDS and other forms of immunodeficiency. Although many common infections are treated by physicians without formal expertise in infectious diseases, specialists may be consulted for cases where an infection is difficult to diagnose or manage. They may also be asked to help determine the cause of a fever of unknown origin.

Specialists in infectious diseases can practice both in hospitals (inpatient) and clinics (outpatient). In hospitals, specialists in infectious diseases help ensure the timely diagnosis and treatment of acute infections by recommending the appropriate diagnostic tests to identify the source of the infection and by recommending appropriate management such as prescribing antibiotics to treat bacterial infections. For certain types of infections, involvement of specialists in infectious diseases may improve patient outcomes. In clinics, specialists in infectious diseases can provide long-term care to patients with chronic infections such as HIV/AIDS.

== History ==
Infectious diseases are historically associated with hygiene and epidemiology due to periodic outbreaks ravaging countries, especially in the cities before the advent of sanitation, but also with travel medicine and tropical medicine, as many diseases acquired in tropical and subtropical areas are infectious in nature.

Western innovations for treating infectious diseases originated in Ancient Greece, and before infectious disease was even conceptualized, a Greek Physician named Hippocrates formed the Hippocratic Corpus. Included in this collection of 70 documents was a text that contained illness-causing infectious diseases. This text, called the Epidemiai volumes, played a key role in forming the western approach to infectious disease. A physician during the Roman empire, Galen of Pergamon, also made great impacts on the western perception of infectious disease with his multiple treatises. These treatises gave insight into the Antonine Plague which we now recognize as smallpox based on the description in Galen's treatises.

Between the 16th and 18th centuries, medical professionals were educating more people, learning more from their research, and gaining access to information from other professionals in the field due to the use of printers like Gutenberg and the mass production of medical books. These books, now in the hands of many, included observations of infectious diseases. Such as syphilis, malaria, and smallpox. In the late 18th century we start to see vaccinations forming and the first vaccination for smallpox was established. Although there were records of individual infectious diseases spread out over medical documents, a combined perception of infectious disease as an area of medicine did not exist at that time.

During the 19th century, modern medicine began to develop and the sources of infectious diseases became more clear. Robert Koch, a German physician who studied pathogens, discovered three major pathogens that were the cause of Anthrax, Tuberculosis, and Cholera. Louis Pasteur was a pioneer in the creation of vaccines for infectious diseases, one being a vaccine for Anthrax. He also developed the germ theory of infectious diseases which influenced Joseph Lister to practice methods during surgery that reduce the growth of pathogens that cause infectious disease. Although infectious disease started to become a more collective concept in the 19th century it was not considered a medical specialty until the 1970s due to a number of newly discovered diseases and vaccines.

== Investigations ==
When diagnosing, a medical professional must first determine if a patient has an infectious disease or another condition not caused by infection but exhibits similar symptoms. Once the illness is confirmed to be caused by an infection, Infectious diseases specialists employ a variety of diagnostic tests to help identify the pathogen that is causing an infection. Common tests include staining, culture tests, serological tests, susceptibility tests, genotyping, nucleic acid-base test, and polymerase chain reaction. Since samples of bodily fluid or tissue are used in these tests, a specialist must distinguish between non-disease-causing bacteria and disease-causing bacteria inhabiting the body to effectively identify and treat the infection.

Staining is a method of testing that uses a special dye to change the color of pathogens and a microscope to view them. The change in color helps doctors distinguish the pathogen from its surrounding and identify what it is. This method is only successful with large and plentiful pathogens present. Therefore, this method is unsuccessful with viruses because they cannot be viewed under a microscope due to their small size. Staining has more of an effect on bacteria where a violet colored stain is used, this is called gram staining. If the bacteria appears blue it is considered gram positive and if it appears red it is gram negative.

Culture tests are done when there is not enough of the pathogen to be seen through other tests. ID specialists will grow the pathogen in the lab until they have enough to work with. Although cultures work on some pathogens, such as the bacteria that causes strep throat, it is ineffective on many others, such as syphilis. A test to identify the pathogen, such as staining, would take place after culture tests.

Susceptibility tests are done by ID specialists to discover which antimicrobial drug would be most effective at killing the pathogen. Cultures can also be used as a form of susceptibility testing by adding the drug to the cultured pathogens and observing whether or not it kills the pathogen and how much of the drug is needed to kill it.

Nucleic acid-base tests are used to detect genetic material. For pathogens that can't be cultured, ID specialists can identify them by looking for specific DNA or RNA. Polymerase chain reaction (PCR), a type of nucleic acid-base test, is similar to culture tests in that genes from the pathogen are duplicated. This method is mainly used when a specific pathogen is suspected.

== Treatments ==
Infectious diseases specialists employ a variety of antimicrobial agents to help treat infections. The type of antimicrobial depends on the organism that is causing the infection. Antibiotics are used to treat bacterial infections; antiviral agents treat viral infections; and antifungal agents treat fungal infections.

== Training ==
Occupation
- Names: Doctor, Medical Specialist, Infectious diseases Consultant
- Occupation type: Specialty
- Activity sectors: Medicine

Description
- Education required: Doctor of Medicine (M.D.) or Doctor of Osteopathic Medicine (D.O.) or Bachelor of Medicine, Bachelor of Surgery (M.B.B.S./MBChB)
- Fields of employment: Hospitals, Clinics

=== United States ===
In the United States, infectious diseases is a subspecialty of internal medicine and pediatrics. In order to sit for the infectious diseases' board certification test (administered by the American Board of Internal Medicine, or the American Board of Pediatrics), physicians must have completed their residency (in internal medicine, or pediatrics), then undergo additional fellowship training (for at least two, or three years, respectively). The exam has been given as a subspecialty of internal medicine since 1972 and as a subspecialty of pediatrics since 1994.
