= Charles O. Rossotti =

American businessman

Charles Rossotti

Commissioner of Internal Revenue
- In office November 13, 1997 – November 6, 2002
- President: Bill Clinton; George W. Bush
- Preceded by: Michael Dolan (Acting)
- Succeeded by: Bob Wenzel (Acting)

Personal details
- Born: January 17, 1941 (age 85) New York City, New York, U.S.
- Education: Georgetown University (BA); Harvard University (MBA)

Charles O. Rossotti (born January 17, 1941) is an American businessman, and former Commissioner of Internal Revenue.

== Early career ==
Rossotti was born in 1941 in New York City and graduated from St. Cecilia High School in Englewood, New Jersey in 1958, before earning a Bachelor of Arts degree in economics from Georgetown University (1962) and a M.B.A. from Harvard Business School (1964). Rossotti was the first ever MBA hire for the Boston Consulting Group. But after only a year, Rossotti went to work for the Office of the Secretary of Defense. From 1965 to 1969, Rossotti worked for Robert McNamara, becoming Deputy Assistant Secretary of Defense for Systems Analysis at age 29.

In 1970, Rossotti and several DOD colleagues co-founded American Management Systems, a technology and management consulting firm. Rossotti was Chief Executive Officer from the late 1980s to the mid-1990s.

Rossotti also sits on the Atlantic Council's Board of Directors.

== IRS years ==
In 1997, Rossotti was named Commissioner of Internal Revenue by then President Bill Clinton where he served for five years.

He was considered a reformer, upgrading the agency's technology, as well as turning the IRS into a more customer service-oriented agency. Rossotti received a waiver from the Clinton administration that allowed him to retain his AMS stock in a blind trust.

After leaving the IRS, Rossotti joined The Carlyle Group, a global private equity firm in Washington, D.C., as a Senior Advisor.

== Publications ==
Rossotti is the author of two books:

- Modernizing America's Tax Agency (2000)
- Many Unhappy Returns: One Man's Quest To Turn Around The Most Unpopular Organization In America (Leadership for the Common Good) (Cambridge: Harvard Business School Press, 2005)

In addition, he provided a foreword to Al Gore's Reinventing Service At The IRS: Report Of The Customer Service Task Force National Performance Review (1997). He has also authored government publications and contributed to other works, including a proposal published in Tax Notes Federal to reduce the tax gap in the United States.

Government offices
| Preceded by Michael Dolan; Acting | Commissioner of Internal Revenue; 1997–2002 | Succeeded by Bob Wenzel; Acting |
