= American Management Systems =

American consulting firm

American Management Systems, Inc.
- Type: Public
- Traded as: Nasdaq: AMSY
- Founded: 1970
- Defunct: 2004
- Fate: Sold, defense related business to CACI, rest of the company to CGI Inc.
- Headquarters: Fairfax, Virginia, U.S.

American Management Systems, Inc., was a high-technology and management consulting firm, founded in 1970 by a group of five former Defense Department officials who had worked under Robert McNamara in the Kennedy and Johnson administration. The company grew throughout the 1980s and 1990s, implementing key systems such as the accounting system for New York City and The Standard Procurement System for the United States Department of Defense. The company was acquired by Canada's CGI Inc. in 2004, with AMS's federal defense business being acquired by CACI.

== History ==
AMS was founded in 1970 by five former Defense Department "Whiz Kids": Charles Rossotti, Ivan Selin, Frank Nicolai, Patrick W. Gross, and Jan Lodal. The company's initial headquarters were in the Washington, D.C. suburb of Arlington, Virginia. The founders drew upon research in attribute-value systems and early relational databases developed by Pentagon colleague Hugh Everett III, who served as a non-administrative vice president and minority partner in the firm for a time. From its inception, much of AMS's revenue was derived from contracts with federal agencies. The company grew quickly during the 1970s. During its first decade of operation, AMS focused its business on consulting and selling customized software to large government and corporate organizations.

The company grew to over nine thousand employees, with many offices in both the United States and other countries. At one point in the 1990s, one quarter of the company's revenue, albeit none of the profit, came from Europe. Much of its business centered on creating large computer systems for various government entities. It created a large accounting system for New York City during the city's recovery from its fiscal crisis in the late 1970s, and won an award for the Defense Department's Standard Procurement System in 1997.

In April 1993, AMS established an applied research lab called the AMS Center for Advanced Technologies (AMSCAT) at their headquarters facility in Fairfax, Virginia. Dr. Jerrold M. Grochow was appointed as the director of AMSCAT.

=== Telecom Practice ===
In the late 1990s and early 2000s, American Management Systems was among the main telecom consulting companies in the United States. The company grew aggressively because of professional talent in the emerging Competitive Local Exchange Companies. As a result, AMS was a market leader to offer its telecom client Kenan's Arbor-B/P, the award-winning convergence Billing Solution.

=== AMS in Europe ===
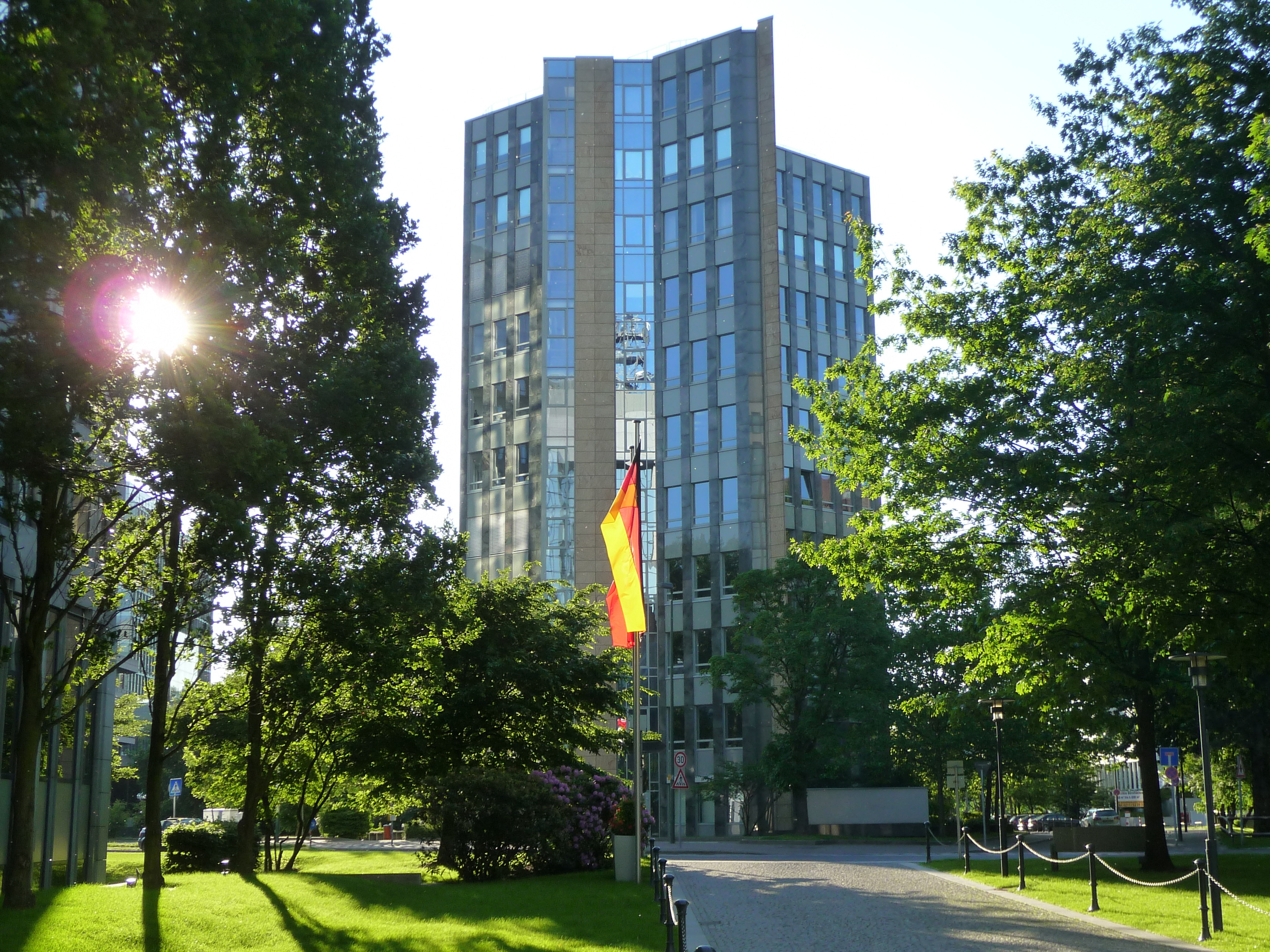
former AMS offices, built near D2 in Düsseldorf, in 2010

At the beginning of the 1990s, AMS provided the PRISM billing solution for the American cellular network operator PacTel Cellular, who later became AirTouch. Following the expansion of the GSM standard in Europe, AirTouch International invested in a number of foreign GSM providers. This led to the expansion of the AMS billing solution, re-branded as Spectrum 2000, into Europe. In 1992 AMS was in a unique position as provider of the billing system to the emerging mobile telco market in Europe, making AMS a major player in the European Market. AMS expanded into Portugal, the UK, Germany, the Netherlands, Belgium, Spain, Switzerland, and Poland. Despite this success, the company did not develop sufficient service delivery and business development units. Instead, it decided to commit to a huge (over 100M$) investment in the development of the sophisticated Customer Care and Billing System Tapestry for German fixed-wire telecom Arcor. Lack of commitment to marketing of this system contributed to the problems that led to significant layoffs in Europe in 2002. Furthermore AMS lost prestige when D2 chose Amdocs for its billing solution.

By 2002, AMS had approximately 6300 employees, 986 million in revenue and 21 million in income and 51 offices worldwide.

=== Lawsuits, divestiture, and sale ===
In 1999, the state government of Mississippi terminated an $11.2 million contract with AMS to modernize the state's tax system and sued the company for $985 million in damages. A jury awarded the state $474.5 million in actual and punitive damages in August 2000, causing a drop in stock price from 44 3/8 to 14. The company subsequently settled the suit for $185 million.

Another customer, the Federal Thrift Investment Board, cancelled a contract in 2000 for a system to make Thrift Savings Plan data available online. The subsequent lawsuit was settled for $5 million in June 2003. A subsequent United States Senate investigation authored by senators Susan Collins and Joe Lieberman identified various reasons for four years of delays and cost overruns, including lack of formal agreement on a detailed design and problems with the structure of the contract.

In December 2002, AMS sold its Global Energy Group to Bangalore, India-based Wipro Technologies.

New CEO Alfred T. Mockett was hired by AMS in 2001 to grow the company's sales from $1.1 billion to $3 billion a year, with a goal of becoming a top tier system integrator through growth and acquisitions, with an eventual goal of a "big bang merger of equals." When this strategy proved unsuccessful, Mockett negotiated a sale of the firm. CGI, a Canadian company, was the primary purchaser, paying $858 million for the commercial business and all government business not related to national defense. The defense portion of AMS could not be sold to a foreign-based company so CACI purchased the defense and intelligence practice for $415 million. The sale to CGI and CACI was announced in March 2004. The AMS brand was retained by CGI for a time and the AMS website directed users to the CGI site. CGI's United States headquarters are in Fairfax, Virginia.

== Location ==
For the first 20 or more years of its existence, the company was based in Arlington, Virginia on the banks of the Potomac River with a commanding view of Washington DC. In the early 1990s, AMS moved its corporate headquarters to Fairfax, Virginia.

== List of chief executive officers of AMS ==
- Ivan Selin - 1970 to late 1980s
- Charles O. Rossotti - Late 1980s to Mid 1990s
- Paul Brands - Mid 1990s to October 25, 2000
- Bill Purdy (Interim) - October 26, 2000 to November 30, 2001
- Alfred T. Mockett - December 1, 2001 to 2004
