= SP =

Sp or SP may refer to:

== Arts and entertainment ==
- /sp/, the sports board on the Internet forum 4chan
- SP (TV series), a Japanese TV series
- Game Boy Advance SP, an upgraded version of the Game Boy Advance handheld video game system, released in 2003
- Standard Play, a magnetic tape speed used for VHS
- Story Pirates, a podcast
- Subdominant parallel, a type of musical chord
- SP, producer stage name of Mumzy Stranger (born 1984), British rapper
- SP, stage name of Krisztián Éder (born 1988), Hungarian rapper
- South Park, an animated American television series
- The Smashing Pumpkins, an American alternative rock band
- The SP line of digital samplers marketed by Roland Corporation under its own name and the Boss brand, most notably the Boss SP-303 (2001) and Roland SP-404 (2005)

== Businesses and organizations ==
- SP (magazine), illustrated news magazine in Spain between 1957 and 1972
- SP Technical Research Institute of Sweden
- ScottishPower, Scottish energy company
- Szkoła Podstawowa ("primary school" in polish)
- Service provider, company that provides organizations with consulting, legal, real estate, education, communications, storage, processing, and many other services
- Silicon Power, Taiwan-based manufacturer of flash memory products and other industrial grade computer products
- Singapore Polytechnic, polytechnic in Dover, Singapore
- Státní podnik ("state business"), former Czechoslovak entity type
- Story point, term used in agile software development methodologies
- Suara Pembaruan, former Indonesian newspaper

=== Government and military ===
- Superintendent of police (India), a senior rank in the Indian police and law enforcement agencies
- A US Navy hull registration number prefix: Section patrol (SP)
- Security Police (Japan), for VIP protection
- Shore patrol, UK and US naval security personnel

=== Political parties ===
- Centre Party (Norway) (Senterpartiet)
- Socialist Party or Social Democratic Party in many places, including:
  - Socialist Party of Albania
  - Samajwadi Party, in India
  - Socialist Party (Netherlands) (Socialistische Partij)
  - Socialistische Partij Anders (Socialistische Partij), a historical name for the sp.a in Belgium
  - Socialist Party (Netherlands, interbellum) (Socialistische Partij) 1918–1929
  - Social Democratic Party of Switzerland
- Swatantra Party, an Indian classical liberal political party 1959–1974

=== Religious organizations ===
- Piarists or Ordo Clericorum Regularium pauperum Matris Dei Scholarum Piarum, a Catholic order
- Südtiroler Pfadfinderschaft, a Catholic scouting association in Italy

== Places ==
- SP postcode area, UK, the Salisbury postcode area
- São Paulo (state), a state in Brazil
  - São Paulo, capital of the state and the most populous city of Brazil

== Science and technology ==
- sp orbitals, in physics, an instance of atomic orbital hybridisation
- Self-propelled (disambiguation)
- Soft-point bullet, a type of ammunition
- Spontaneous potential differences in the Earth
- Stated Preference, a choice modelling method
- Surface plasmon, a type of electron oscillation along metallic surfaces
- A Unified Soil Classification System symbol for sand, poorly graded

=== Biology and medicine ===
- Sp. (biology), abbreviation for species
- Simulated patient, for medical training
- Substance P, a neuropeptide
- Status post, notes about sequelae with reference to their cause

=== Computing and telecommunications ===
- IBM RS/6000 SP, supercomputer series
- Service pack, software update
- Stack pointer
- Stored procedure
- Synthetic programming

=== Mathematics ===
- Trace (linear algebra), or "Spur" (German), of a square matrix
- Sp(n) and Sp(2n,F), a symplectic group in mathematics

== Transportation ==
- SATA Air Acores (IATA code SP)
- Saidapet railway station (station code SP)
- Southern Pacific Railroad (reporting mark SP)

== Other uses ==
- 25 metre pistol, a shooting sport formerly known as sport pistol
- Aircraft registration prefix for Poland
- s.p., sine prole (Latin: "without issue" (i.e., having no children), full form d.s.p. decessit sine prole, "died without issue")
- Ś.P. Świętej pamięci meaning holy memory is written on many Polish gravestones
- Provincial road (Italy) (Strada Provinciale), a category of provincial roads in Italy
- September
- Seri Pahlawan Gagah Perkasa (S.P.), a Malaysian military decoration
- Spain, particularly used on maps to denote Spanish possessions, territories, etc.
- Spanish language
- Special (disambiguation)
- Spelling, especially to note a spelling error
- Spurius, the Roman praenomen; see Spurius (disambiguation)
- Starting pitcher, a team's first pitcher in a game of baseball or softball
- Suppressive person, in Scientology
- Starting price, odds applicable on a particular entry in a horse race (or other race) as the race is about to start
- Superintendent (police), a rank in British police services and in most English-speaking Commonwealth nations
- SP, an abbreviation for the Syrian pound
- "Shot put" athletics abbreviation in track and field
- Nikon SP, a 1957 35 mm rangefinder film camera

== See also ==
- SPs
- SPS (disambiguation)
