= Robert James Valentine Pulvertaft =

English pathologist

- Born: 14 February 1897; Cork, Ireland
- Died: 30 March 1990 (aged 93)
- Education: Trinity College, Cambridge
- Scientific career
- Fields: Patholgy
- Workplaces: Westminster Hospital

Robert James Valentine Pulvertaft, OBE (14 February 1897 – 30 March 1990) was an Anglo-Irish pathologist. Born in Cork, Ireland, Pulvertaft served in the First World War before undertaking a medical education at Trinity College, Cambridge, and St. Thomas's Hospital, London. He became the laboratory director at Westminster Hospital in 1931 and earned a medical degree from Cambridge in 1933. He served in the Royal Army Medical Corps during the Second World War, reaching the rank of lieutenant colonel and serving as a pathologist in hospitals in Egypt. During his time abroad, he developed methods for local production of penicillin and treated Winston Churchill during his illness in Tunisia. Pulvertaft was named an Officer of the Order of the British Empire in 1944. After his return to England, he became professor of clinical pathology at Westminster Hospital in 1946, serving in this role until his retirement in 1962. The same year, he was made an honorary fellow of the Royal Society of Medicine. After his retirement from Westminster, he travelled to Africa, where he conducted research on lymphoma. Pulvertaft returned to England at the age of 70 and died in Macclesfield in 1990.

== Early life and education ==
Pulvertaft was born in Cork, Ireland on 14 February 1897 to the Anglo-Irish reverend T.J. Pulvertaft and an Irish mother. He was educated at Westminster School and earned a scholarship in classics from Cambridge University, but then left England to serve in the First World War, serving successively as an infantryman in Palestine, a fighter pilot in Egypt, and a bomber pilot in France. After returning from military service, he studied physiology at Trinity College, Cambridge and trained in medicine at St. Thomas's Hospital, London. Following his graduation, Pulvertaft worked in the laboratory at St. Joseph's and published works on laboratory medicine, notably a guide to blood cultures in 1930 which presaged methods used today. He became the laboratory director at Westminster Hospital in 1931 and earned his medical degree from Cambridge in 1933.

== Medical career ==
During the Second World War, Pulvertaft served in the Royal Army Medical Corps, reaching the rank of lieutenant colonel. He served as pathologist of the 64th General Hospital in Alexandria and later ran the laboratory at the 15th General Scottish Hospital in Cairo. There, beginning in 1942, he conducted early studies on the effect of penicillin on war wounds, and developed methods to produce a crude form of the drug locally to supplement the small supplies received from Britain. In December 1943, Pulvertaft was summoned to Bizerta to attend to Winston Churchill during a severe bout of pneumonia; he set up a makeshift laboratory in the prime minister's villa and monitored his blood results daily for a week. Pulvertaft wrote a detailed account of Churchill's illness in his unpublished autobiography. The next year, Pulvertaft was transferred to Jerusalem; later he served in England. He was named an Officer of the Order of the British Empire in 1944.

Pulvertaft returned to Westminster Hospital after the war, where, influenced by the Goodenough Report on medical education, he established new laboratory departments and pathology chairs, and strengthened Westminster's reputation as a teaching hospital. He was named professor of clinical pathology at Westminster in 1946. There he used cinemicrography to study lymphocytes, describing the phenomenon of emperipolesis, and conducted research on melanoma. Pulvertaft became president of the Association of Clinical Pathologists in 1953 and was made an honorary fellow of the Royal Society of Medicine in 1962.

== Personal life ==
Pulvertaft was known for his eccentric personality and was nicknamed "Bulgy" for his protruding eyes. In his spare time he wrote poetry. Around 1920, Pulvertaft married Isobel Costello; the couple had three children. Isobel died in 1985.

== Later life and death ==
Pulvertaft retired from Westminster in 1962. He later worked in Africa, where he taught at University College, Ibadan and Makerere University College, and, assisted by his wife, carried out studies on Burkitt lymphoma. At the age of 70 Pulvertaft returned to England, settling in Dorset, and later moving to Cambridge. He died in Macclesfield on 30 March 1990.
