= Shell Processing Support =

Shell Processing Support (SPS) is a set of formatted files used for exchanging Land 3D seismic data. They can also be used for 2D.

== History ==
Shell Processing Support data format was initially defined and used by Shell Internationale Petroleum for transferring of seismic and positioning data to the processing centres. In 1993 SEG Technical standards committee on ancillary data formats adopted SPS as the standard format for exchanging Geophysical positioning data.

== SPS Format ==
SPS format is a set of three files called Receiver file, Source file, Cross reference file and an optional fourth file for comments. In addition to the comment file comments can be entered in each of the three files as part of the header and is indicated by starting with the letter H.

Receiver file: Receiver file contains the information about the geophones their type, position (Easting, Northing, Elevation) and their ID.

Source file: Source file contains the information about the Seismic source its position and their ID.

Cross reference file: Cross reference file (also known as relational file) or in short, X file, is basically a relational file relating the source and the receiver when the shot occurred. It contains the details about the Shot ID, Source and receivers associated with that particular shot ID.

Comment file: This file is an optional file. Any other information regarding the seismic acquisition can be provided in this file for the processing center.

== Versions ==
- The first version of SPS adopted by SEG is now referred to as SPS rev0
- The recent version of SPS is SPS rev2.1
