= Spurius (disambiguation) =

Spurius is a genus of passalid beetles.

Spurius may also refer to:

- Spurius (praenomen)
  - Spurius Maelius
  - Spurius Tarpeius
  - Spurius Antius
  - Spurius Carvilius Ruga
  - Spurius Cassius Vecellinus
- Spurius, plural spurii, a person born to an unwed mother in Roman law
