= The Standard Procurement System =

The Standard Procurement System (SPS) is a software suite developed during the 1990s, which provides front-office business services for acquisition professionals in the United States Department of Defense.

== Program History ==
SPS is an outgrowth of the DoD Corporate Information Management (CIM) initiatives in the early 1990s, and is intended to provide standard business processes and data management across disparate acquisition communities, including:

- Posts, camps, and stations
- Inventory Control Points
- Major Weapon Systems
- Contingency contracting

The Standard Procurement System initiative began in 1994 with a directive from the Director of Defense Procurement to standardize the then approximately 70 acquisition systems in use on a single platform. In August 1996, the SPS contract was awarded through a competitive process to American Management Systems. The contract directed AMS to build the Standard Procurement System through an incremental process on top of the company's existing Procurement Desktop - Defense (PD^{2}) application.

SPS is one of the first DoD software acquisitions using Federal Acquisition Regulation (FAR) Part 12 - Acquisition of Commercial Items rules. One of the major drivers behind SPS was the use of Commercial off-the-shelf, or COTS, software. The software is licensed rather than purchased outright, and at the time marked a major shift in acquisition strategy for DoD. While DoD had previous experience in licensing software, it largely revolved around either desktop computing (operating systems, office automation products, etc.) or back-end servers (mainframe operating systems, relational database management systems, etc.). SPS is a business system and is licensed for 43,000 contracting officers and other acquisition professionals at DoD sites world-wide.

The deployment of SPS met with several challenges, including a stop-development order in 2002 from the US Government Accountability Office (GAO). The program resumed after establishing an internal requirements board, automating its integration capabilities, improving product documentation, and implementing a shift from a client-server architecture to a Web application architecture.

By 2008, SPS had been deployed on more than 23,000 desktops worldwide, and processed more than $131 billion in fiscal year (FY) 2006, up from $59.0 billion in FY 2004

In 2020, the DoD Standard Procurement System (SPS), deployed using the Procurement Desktop-Defense (PD2) application was still widely in use by many agencies, although the change in technology environment and age led to intent to sunset, which was pushed out to at least 2020.

== Acknowledgement ==
The SPS program has received several awards, including the Top Fed 100 award from Federal Computer Week (2003), the Grace Hopper Technology Leadership Award (2003), and CIO Magazine's CIO Enterprise Value Award (2005).
