= Sodium polyanethol sulfonate =

Names
- IUPAC name poly(4-styrenesulfonate), sodium salt
- Other names: SPS; sodium polyanetholesulfonate

Identifiers
CAS Number	55963-78-5
ChemSpider	4939420
PubChem CID	6434512

Properties
Chemical formula	(C_{10}H_{11}NaO_{4}S)_{n}
Molar mass	Variable (polymeric)
Appearance	White to off-white powder
Solubility in water	Highly soluble in water

Hazards
- GHS labelling
Pictograms	(GHS07: Exclamation mark)
Signal word	Warning
Hazard statements	H315, H319, H335
Precautionary statements	P261, P264, P264+P265, P271, P280, P302+P352, P304+P340, P305+P351+P338, P319, P321, P332+P317, P337+P317, P362+P364, P403+P233, P405, P501
- Except where otherwise noted, data are given for materials in their standard state (at 25 °C [77 °F], 100 kPa). Infobox references

Sodium polyanethol sulfonate (SPS) is a polyanionic compound. It is a common additive to blood culture media used to grow bacteria in patients with bacteremia. SPS is as an anticoagulant and inhibitor of many human antimicrobial immune functions, improving recovery of microorganisms from blood specimens. It is a standard component of clinical blood culture systems, where it prevents microbial killing by both humoral and cellular immune mechanisms present in the blood.

== Mechanism of action ==
=== Anti-immune activity ===
SPS inhibits both humoral and cell mediated immune responses present in the patient's blood, including serum bactericidal activity and leukocyte mediated killing. In untreated blood, microorganisms may be killed rapidly by serum factors and phagocytic cells, reducing their recovery in culture. SPS inhibits these immune mechanisms, improving yield. SPS also inhibits complement-mediated killing by directly blocking complement activation through inhibition of C1q.

=== Anticoagulant activity ===
SPS inhibits coagulation of blood, allowing it to remain liquid. It mediates anticoagulation by enhancing the activity of the natural anticoagulant antithrombin III.

== Uses ==
=== Blood cultures ===
SPS has been a common component of blood culture media since the 1930s. Many other anticoagulants cannot be used in blood cultures due to interference with nucleic acid amplification testing.

Some microorganisms are inhibited by SPS. Organisms that are inhibited by SPS include:

- Gardnerella vaginalis
- Haemophilus ducreyi
- Neisseria gonorrhoeae
- Streptobacillus moniliformis

=== Bacterial identification ===
Peptostreptococcus anaerobius is the only anaerobic cocci that is susceptible to SPS. Disks containing SPS are commercially available to be used for the identification of P. anaerobius from clinical specimens.
