= Blood culture =

Test to detect bloodstream infections

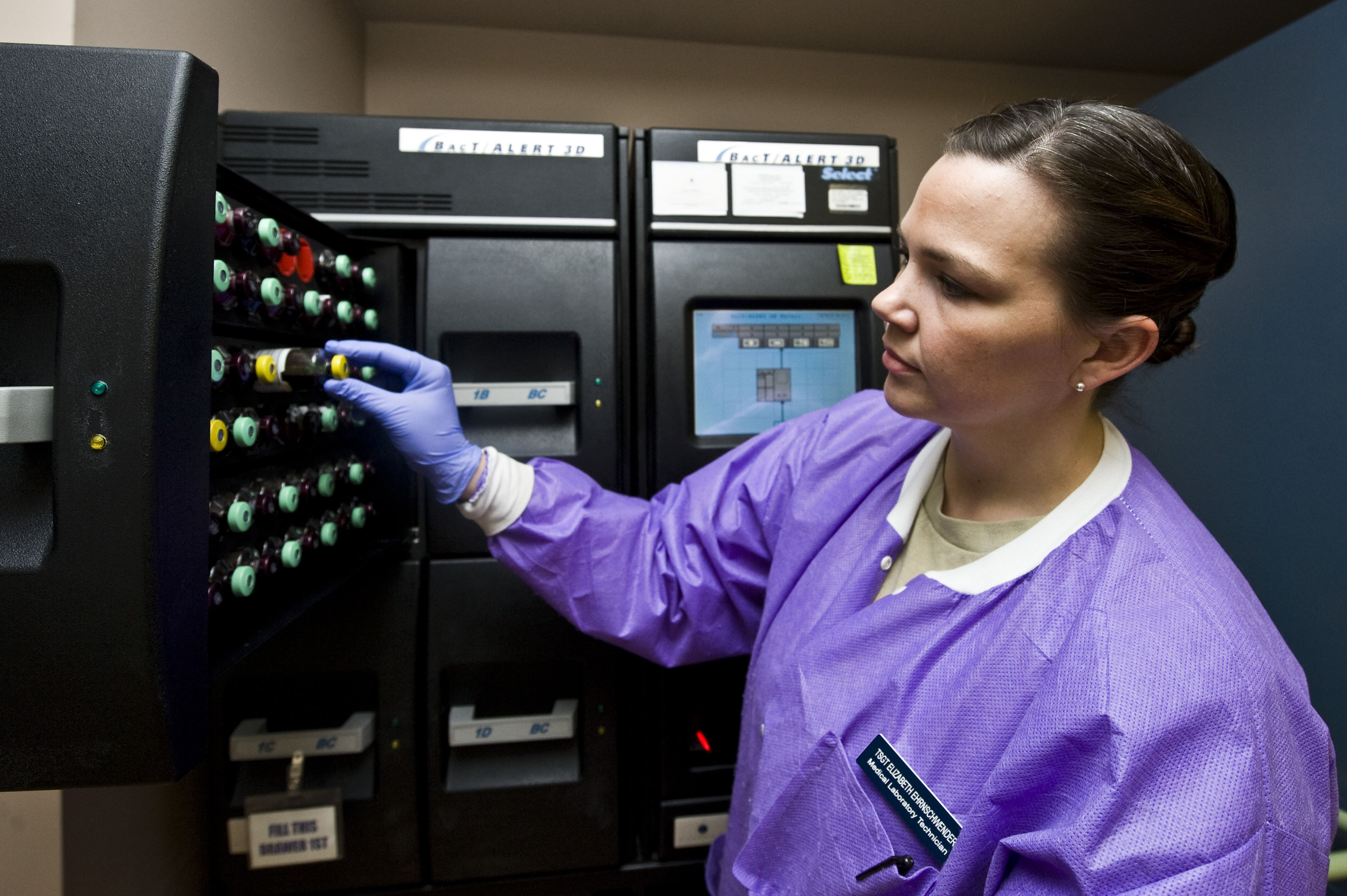
- A laboratory worker unloads blood culture bottles from a BACT/Alert machine, an automated system used to incubate blood cultures and detect microbial growth
- MeSH: D000071997
- LOINC: 600-7
- MedlinePlus: 003744

A blood culture is a medical laboratory test used to detect bacteria or fungi in a person's blood. Under normal conditions, the blood does not contain microorganisms: their presence can indicate a bloodstream infection such as bacteremia or fungemia, which in severe cases may result in sepsis. By culturing the blood, microbes can be identified and tested for resistance to antimicrobial drugs, which allows clinicians to provide an effective treatment.

To perform the test, blood is drawn into bottles containing a liquid formula that enhances microbial growth, called a culture medium. Usually, two containers are collected during one draw, one of which is designed for aerobic organisms that require oxygen, and one of which is for anaerobic organisms, that do not. These two containers are referred to as a set of blood cultures. Two sets of blood cultures are sometimes collected from two different blood draw sites. If an organism only appears in one of the two sets, it is more likely to represent contamination with skin flora than a true bloodstream infection. False negative results can occur if the sample is collected after the person has received antimicrobial drugs or if the bottles are not filled with the recommended amount of blood. Some organisms do not grow well in blood cultures and require special techniques for detection.

The containers are placed in an incubator for several days to allow the organisms to multiply. If microbial growth is detected, a Gram stain is conducted from the culture bottle to confirm that organisms are present and provide preliminary information about their identity. The blood is then subcultured, meaning it is streaked onto an agar plate to isolate microbial colonies for full identification and antimicrobial susceptibility testing. Because it is essential that bloodstream infections are diagnosed and treated quickly, rapid testing methods have been developed using technologies like polymerase chain reaction and MALDI-TOF MS.

Procedures for culturing the blood were published as early as the mid-19th century, but these techniques were labour-intensive and bore little resemblance to contemporary methods. Detection of microbial growth involved visual examination of the culture bottles until automated blood culture systems, which monitor gases produced by microbial metabolism, were introduced in the 1970s. In developed countries, manual blood culture methods have largely been made obsolete by automated systems.

== Medical uses ==
Blood is normally sterile. The presence of bacteria in the blood is termed bacteremia, and the presence of fungi is called fungemia. Minor damage to the skin or mucous membranes, which can occur in situations like toothbrushing or defecation, can introduce bacteria into the bloodstream, but this bacteremia is normally transient and is rarely detected in cultures because the immune system and reticuloendothelial system quickly sequester and destroy the organisms. Bacteria can enter the blood from infections such as cellulitis, UTIs and pneumonia; and infections within the vascular system, such as bacterial endocarditis or infections associated with intravenous lines, may result in a constant bacteremia. Fungemia occurs most commonly in people with poorly functioning immune systems. If bacteria or fungi are not cleared from the bloodstream, they can spread to other organs and tissues, or evoke an immune response that leads to a systemic inflammatory condition called sepsis, which can be life-threatening.

When sepsis is suspected, it is necessary to draw blood cultures to identify the causative agent and provide targeted antimicrobial therapy. People who are hospitalized and have a fever, a low body temperature, a high white blood cell count or a low count of granulocytes (a category of white blood cells) commonly have cultures drawn to detect a possible bloodstream infection. Blood cultures are used to detect bloodstream infections in febrile neutropenia, a common complication of chemotherapy in which fever occurs alongside a severely low count of neutrophils (white blood cells that defend against bacterial and fungal pathogens). Bacteremia is common in some types of infections, such as meningitis, septic arthritis and epidural abscesses, so blood cultures are indicated in these conditions. In infections less strongly associated with bacteremia, blood culture may still be indicated if the individual is at high risk of acquiring an intravascular infection or if cultures cannot be promptly obtained from the main site of infection (for example, a urine culture in pyelonephritis or a sputum culture in severe community-acquired pneumonia). Blood culture can identify an underlying microbial cause in cases of endocarditis and fever of unknown origin.

The pathogens most frequently identified in blood cultures include Staphylococcus aureus, Escherichia coli and other members of the family Enterobacteriaceae, Enterococcus species, Pseudomonas aeruginosa and Candida albicans. Coagulase-negative staphylococci (CNS) are also commonly encountered, although it is often unclear whether these organisms, which constitute part of the normal skin flora, are true pathogens or merely contaminants. In blood cultures taken from newborn babies and children, CNS can indicate significant infections. The epidemiology of bloodstream infections varies with time and place; for instance, Gram-positive organisms overtook Gram-negative organisms as the predominant cause of bacteremia in the United States during the 1980s and 1990s, and rates of fungemia have greatly increased in association with a growing population of people receiving immunosuppressive treatments such as chemotherapy. Gram-negative sepsis is more common in Central and South America, Eastern Europe, and Asia than in North America and Western Europe; and in Africa, Salmonella enterica is a leading cause of bacteremia.

== Procedure ==
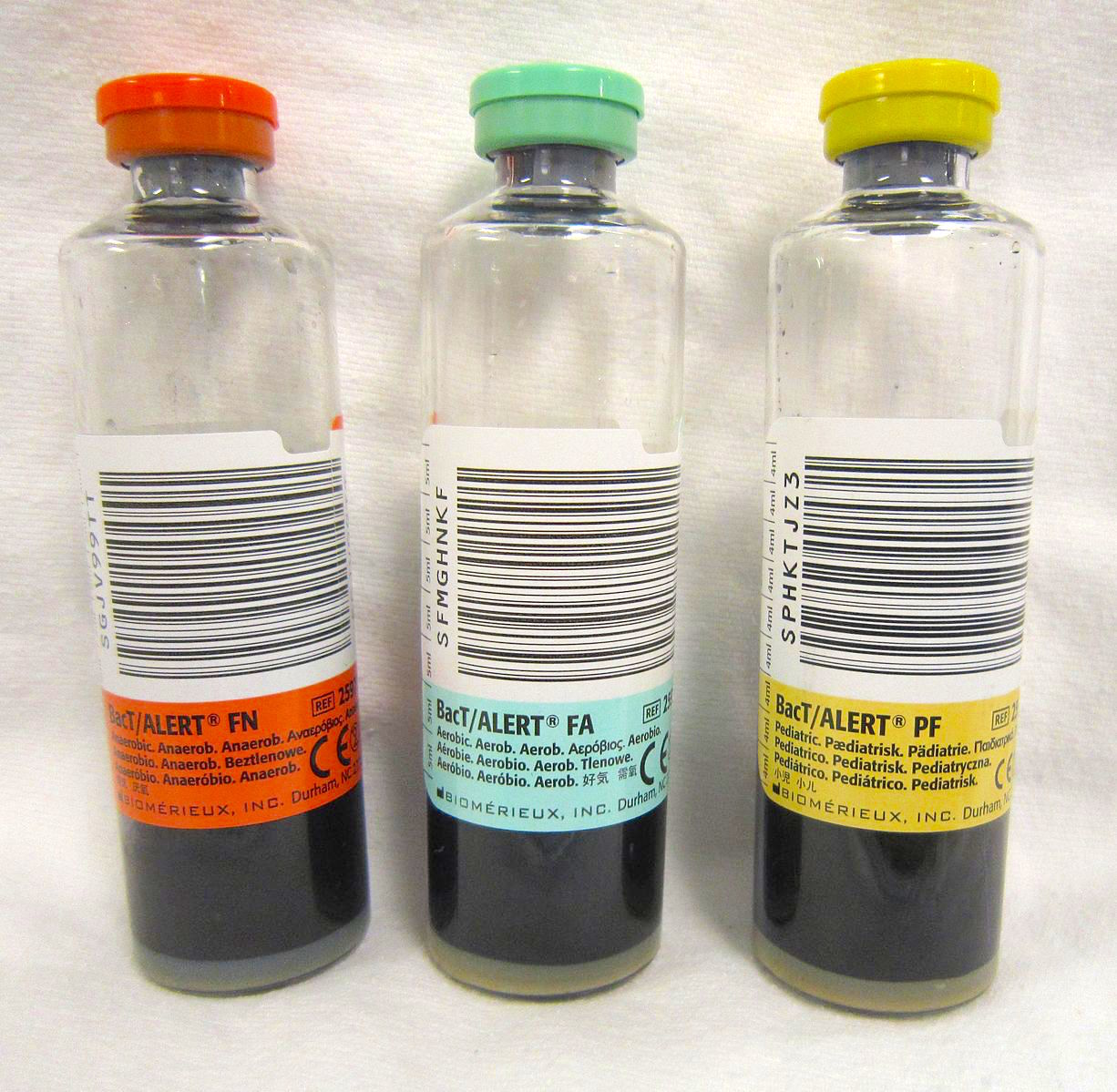
Anaerobic, aerobic, and paediatric blood culture bottles

=== Collection ===
Blood cultures are typically drawn through venipuncture. Collecting the sample from an intravenous line is not recommended, as this is associated with higher contamination rates, although cultures may be collected from both venipuncture and an intravenous line to diagnose catheter-associated infections. Prior to the blood draw, the top of each collection bottle is disinfected using an alcohol swab to prevent contamination. The skin around the puncture site is then cleaned and left to dry; some protocols recommend disinfection with an alcohol-based antiseptic followed by either chlorhexidine or an iodine-based preparation, (Note: Chlorhexidine is not recommended for use in infants under two months old, and iodine-based antiseptics are contraindicated in low-birth-weight infants.) while others consider using only an alcohol-containing antiseptic to be sufficient. If blood must be drawn for other tests at the same time as a blood culture, the culture bottles are drawn first to minimize the risk of contamination. Because antimicrobial therapy can cause false negative results by inhibiting the growth of microbes, it is recommended that blood cultures are drawn before antimicrobial drugs are given, although this may be impractical in people who are critically ill.

A typical blood culture collection involves drawing blood into two bottles, which together form one "culture" or "set". One bottle is designed to enhance the growth of aerobic organisms, and the other is designed to grow anaerobic organisms. In children, infection with anaerobic bacteria is uncommon, so a single aerobic bottle may be collected to minimize the amount of blood required. It is recommended that at least two sets are collected from two separate venipuncture locations. This helps to distinguish infection from contamination, as contaminants are less likely to appear in more than one set than true pathogens. Additionally, the collection of larger volumes of blood increases the likelihood that microorganisms will be detected if present.

Blood culture bottles contain a growth medium, which encourages microorganisms to multiply, and an anticoagulant that prevents blood from clotting. Sodium polyanethol sulfonate (SPS) is the most commonly used anticoagulant because it does not interfere with the growth of most organisms. The exact composition of the growth medium varies, but aerobic bottles use a broth that is enriched with nutrients, such as brain-heart infusion or trypticase soy broth, and anaerobic bottles typically contain a reducing agent such as thioglycollate. The empty space in an anaerobic bottle is filled with a gas mixture that does not contain oxygen.

Many commercially manufactured bottles contain a resin that absorbs antibiotics to reduce their action on the microorganisms in the sample. Bottles intended for paediatric use are designed to accommodate lower blood volumes and have additives that enhance the growth of pathogens more commonly found in children. Other specialized bottles may be used to detect fungi and mycobacteria. In low and middle income countries, pre-formulated culture bottles can be prohibitively expensive, and it may be necessary to prepare the bottles manually. It can be difficult to access the proper supplies and facilities, and in some regions, it may not be possible to perform blood cultures at all.

It is important that the bottles are neither underfilled nor overfilled: underfilling can lead to false negative results as fewer organisms are present in the sample, while overfilling can inhibit microbial growth because the ratio of growth medium to blood is comparatively lower. A 1:10 to 1:5 ratio of blood to culture medium is suggested to optimize microbial growth. For routine blood cultures in adults, the Clinical and Laboratory Standards Institute (CLSI) recommends the collection of two sets of bottles from two different draws, with 20–30 mL of blood drawn in each set. In children, the amount of blood to be drawn is often based on the child's age or weight. If endocarditis is suspected, a total of six bottles may be collected.

=== Culturing ===
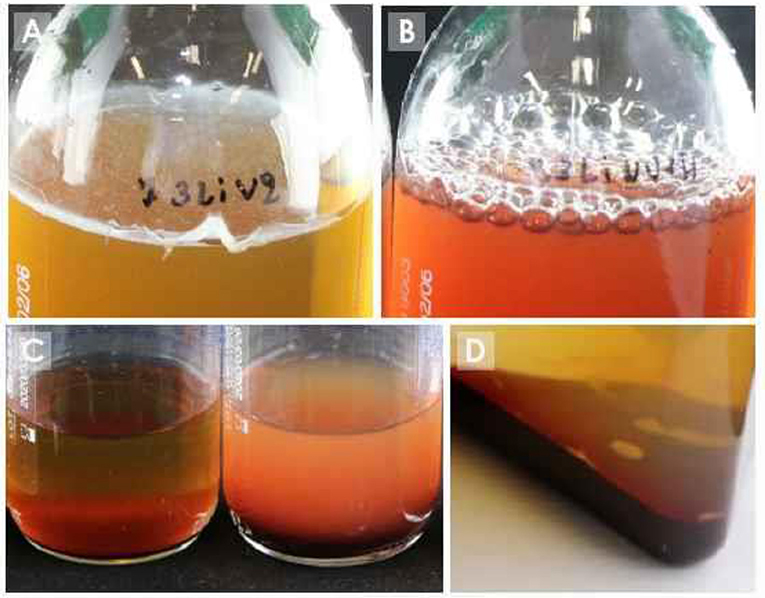
Signs of growth in manual blood culture systems: a) a film of growth (pellicle) on the surface; b) bubbles from gas production; c) turbidity from microbial growth (in right bottle); d) visible microbial colonies

After the blood is collected, the bottles are incubated at body temperature to encourage the growth of microorganisms. Bottles are usually incubated for up to five days in automated systems, although most common bloodstream pathogens are detected within 48 hours. The incubation time may be extended further if manual blood culture methods are used or if slower-growing organisms, such as certain bacteria that cause endocarditis, are suspected. In manual systems, the bottles are visually examined for indicators of microbial growth, which might include cloudiness, the production of gas, the presence of visible microbial colonies, or a change in colour from the digestion of blood, which is called hemolysis. Some manual blood culture systems indicate growth using a compartment that fills with fluid when gases are produced, or a miniature agar plate which is periodically inoculated by tipping the bottle. To ensure that positive blood cultures are not missed, a sample from the bottle is often inoculated onto an agar plate (subcultured) at the end of the incubation period regardless of whether or not indicators of growth are observed.

In developed countries, manual culture methods have largely been replaced by automated systems that provide continuous computerized monitoring of the culture bottles. These systems, such as the BACTEC, BacT/ALERT and VersaTrek, consist of an incubator in which the culture bottles are continuously mixed. Growth is detected by sensors that measure the levels of gases inside the bottle—most commonly carbon dioxide—which serve as an indicator of microbial metabolism. An alarm or a visual indicator alerts the microbiologist to the presence of a positive blood culture bottle. If the bottle remains negative at the end of the incubation period, it is generally discarded without being subcultured.

A technique called the lysis-centrifugation method can be used for improved isolation of slow-growing or fastidious organisms, such as fungi, mycobacteria, and Legionella. Rather than incubating the blood in a bottle filled with growth medium, this method involves collecting blood into a tube containing an agent that destroys (lyses) red and white blood cells, then spinning the sample in a centrifuge. This process concentrates the solid contents of the sample, including microorganisms if present, into a pellet, which is used to inoculate the subculture media. While lysis-centrifugation offers greater sensitivity than conventional blood culture methods, it is prone to contamination because it requires extensive manipulation of the sample.

=== Identification ===
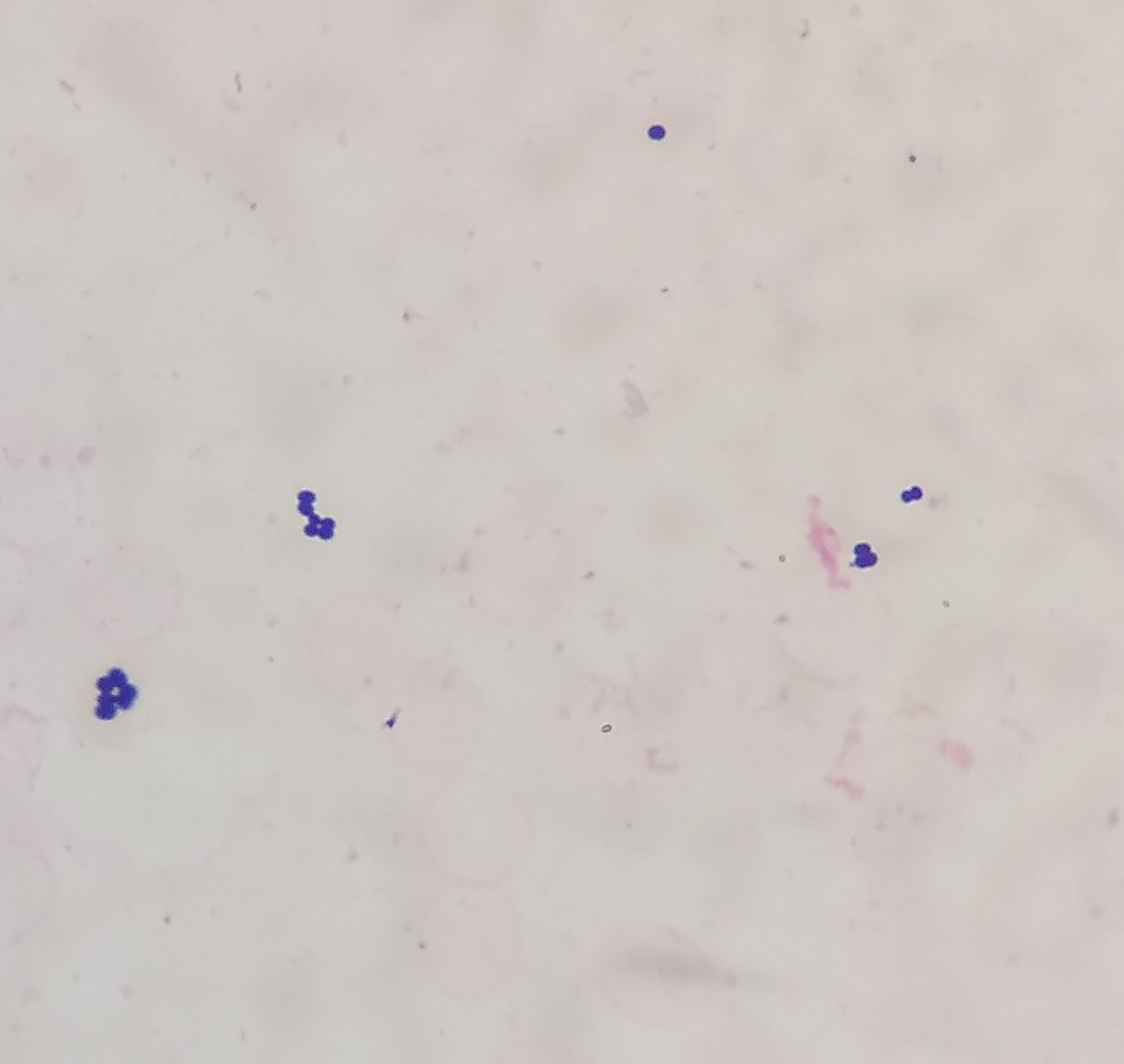
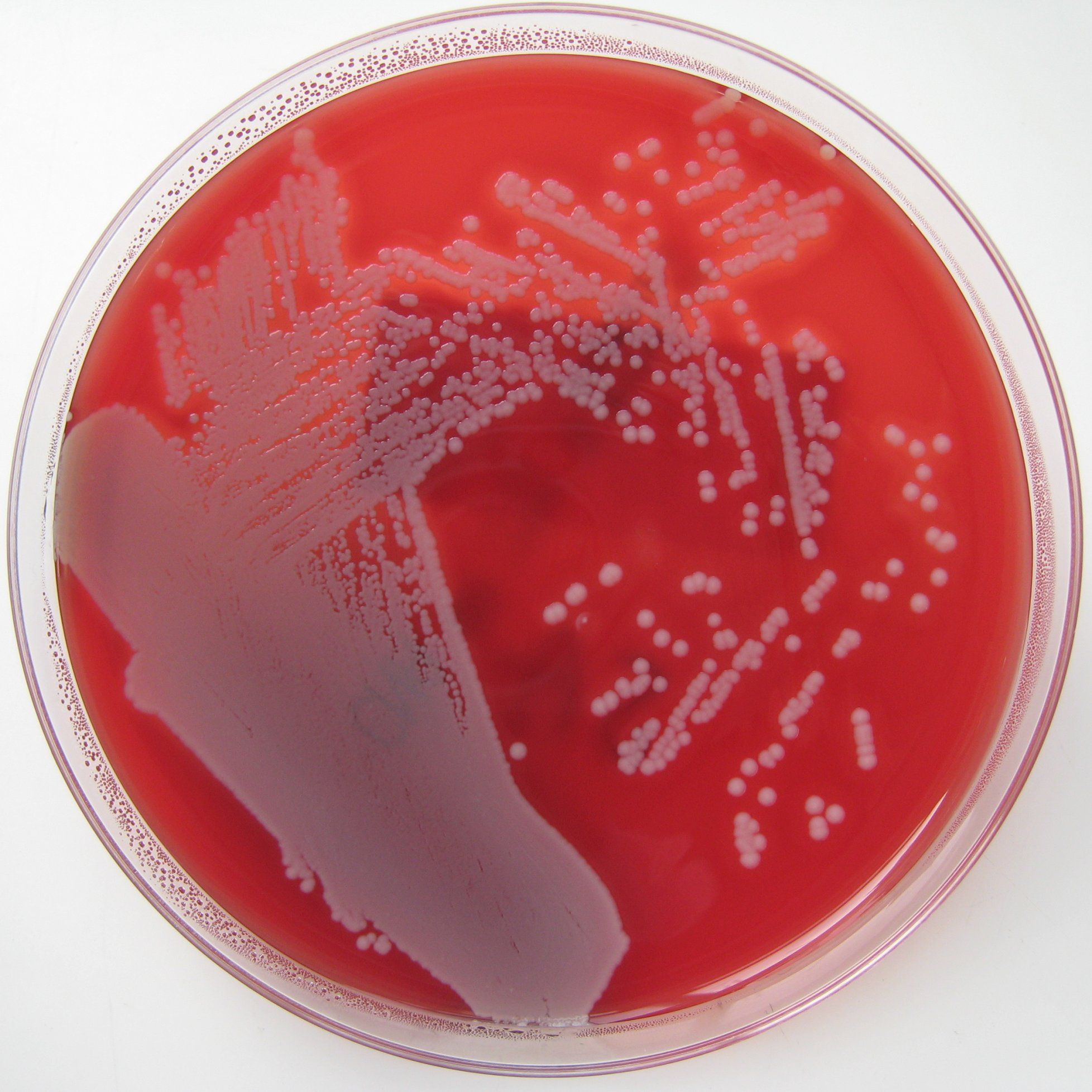
Left: Direct Gram stain from a positive blood culture bottle, showing spherical bacteria (cocci) that stain purple (Gram-positive). Right: Growth of Staphylococcus aureus, a Gram-positive coccus and a pathogen commonly isolated from blood cultures, on blood agar.

If growth is detected, a microbiologist will perform a Gram stain on a sample of blood from the bottle for a rapid preliminary identification of the organism. The Gram stain classifies bacteria as Gram-positive or Gram-negative and provides information about their shape—whether they are rod-shaped (referred to as bacilli), spherical (referred to as cocci), or spiral-shaped (spirochetes)—as well as their arrangement. Gram-positive cocci in clusters, for example, are typical of Staphylococcus species. Yeast and other fungi may also be identified from the Gram stain. A Gram stain identifying microbial growth from a blood culture is considered a critical result and must immediately be reported to the clinician. The Gram stain provides information about the possible identity of the organism, which assists the clinician in the selection of a more appropriate antimicrobial treatment before the full culture and sensitivity results are complete.

In traditional methods, the blood is then subcultured onto agar plates to isolate the organism for further testing. The Gram stain results inform microbiologists about what types of agar plates should be used and what tests might be appropriate to identify the organism. In some cases, no organisms are seen on the Gram stain despite the culture bottle showing indicators of growth or being reported as positive by automated instruments. This may represent a false positive result, but it is possible that organisms are present but cannot easily be visualized microscopically. Positive bottles with negative Gram stains are subcultured before being returned to the incubator, often using special culture media that promotes the growth of slow-growing organisms.

It typically takes 24 to 48 hours for sufficient growth to occur on the subculture plates for definitive identification to be possible. At this point, the microbiologist will assess the appearance of the bacterial or fungal colonies and carry out tests that provide information about the metabolic and biochemical features of the organism, which permit identification to the genus or species level. For example, the catalase test can distinguish streptococci and staphylococci (two genera of Gram-positive cocci) from each other, and the coagulase test can differentiate Staphylococcus aureus, a common culprit of bloodstream infections, from the less pathogenic coagulase-negative staphylococci.

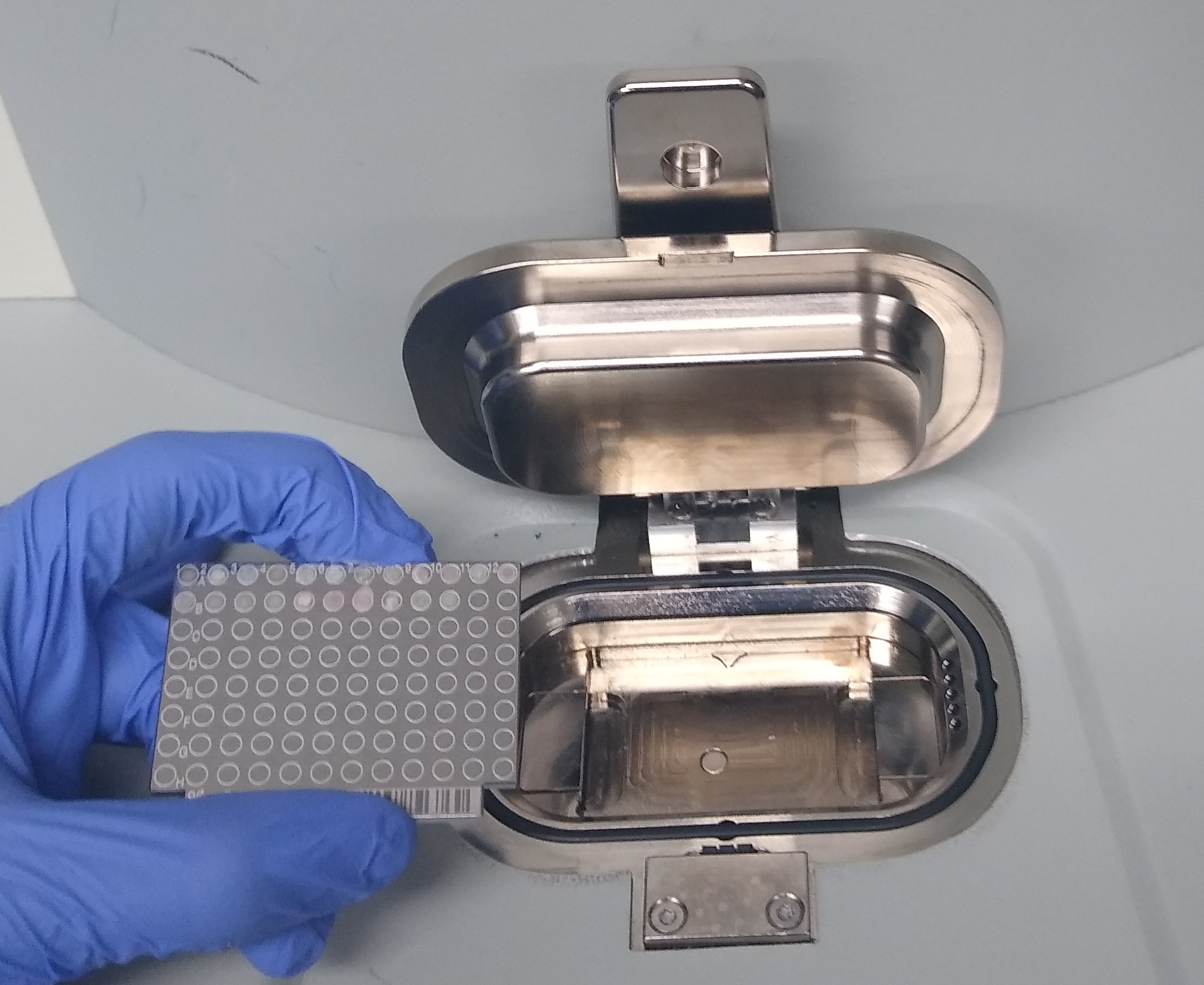
Loading a target plate containing microbial samples into a Bruker Biotyper, an instrument used for MALDI-TOF analysis in microbiology

Microorganisms may also be identified using automated systems, such as instruments that perform panels of biochemical tests, or matrix-assisted laser desorption/ionization time-of-flight mass spectrometry (MALDI-TOF MS), in which microbial proteins are ionized and characterized on the basis of their mass-to-charge ratios; each microbial species exhibits a characteristic pattern of proteins when analyzed through mass spectrometry.

Because bloodstream infections can be life-threatening, timely diagnosis and treatment is critical, and to this end several rapid identification methods have been developed. MALDI-TOF can be used to identify organisms directly from positive blood culture bottles after separation and concentration procedures, or from preliminary growth on the agar plate within a few hours of subculturing. Genetic methods such as polymerase chain reaction (PCR) and microarrays can identify microorganisms by detection of DNA sequences specific to certain species in blood culture samples. Several systems designed for the identification of common blood culture pathogens are commercially available. Some biochemical and immunologic tests can be performed directly on positive blood cultures, such as the tube coagulase test for identification of S. aureus or latex agglutination tests for Streptococcus pneumoniae, and unlike PCR and MALDI-TOF, these methods may be practical for laboratories in low and middle income countries. It is also possible to directly inoculate microbial identification panels with blood from a positive culture bottle, although this is not as reliable as testing subcultured bacteria because additives from the growth media can interfere with the results.

Even faster diagnosis could be achieved through bypassing culture entirely and detecting pathogens directly from blood samples. A few direct testing systems are commercially available as of 2018, but the technology is still in its infancy. Most panels detect only a limited number of pathogens, and the sensitivity can be poor compared to conventional blood culture methods. Culturing remains necessary in order to carry out full antimicrobial sensitivity testing.

=== Antibiotic susceptibility testing ===
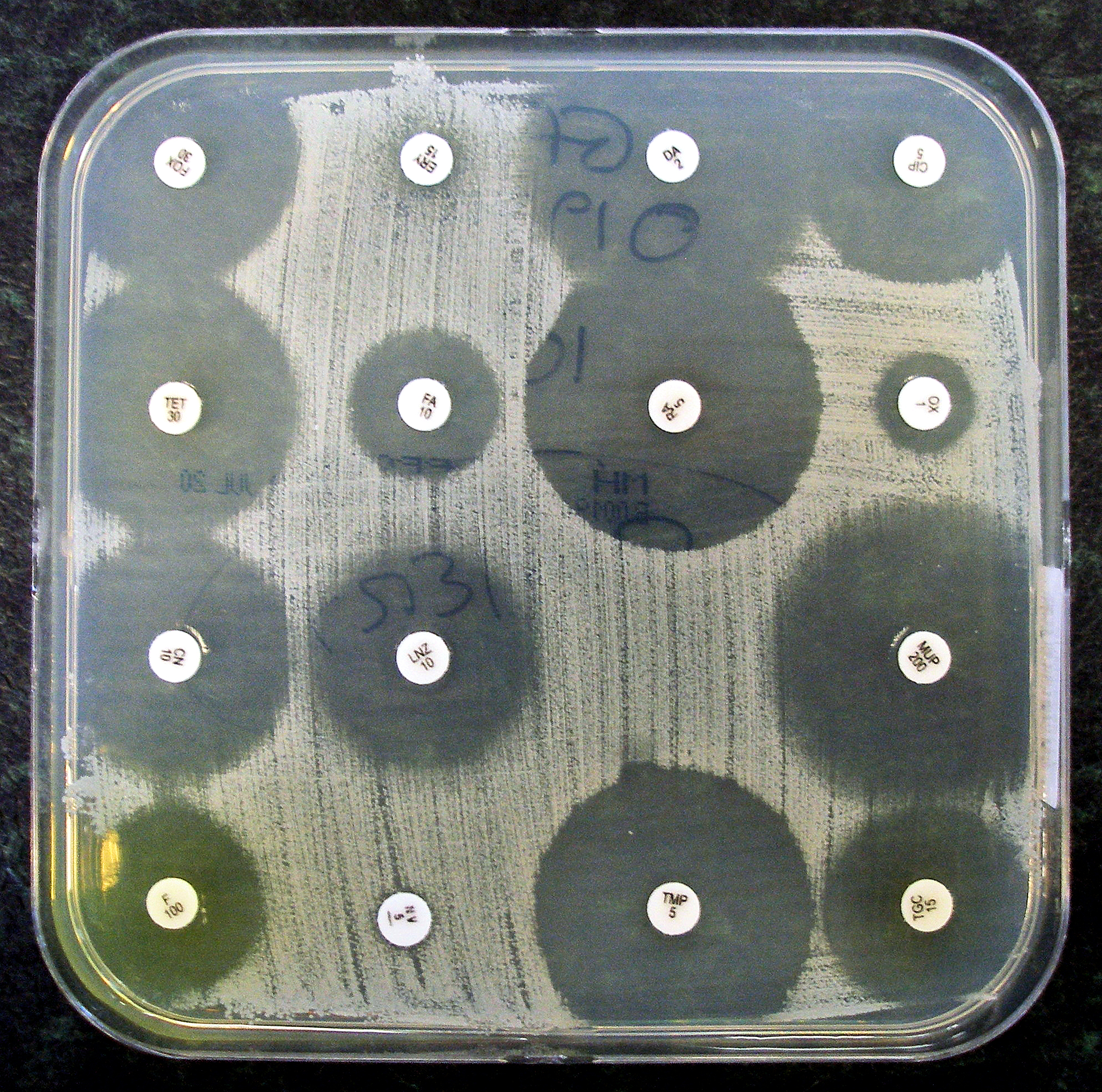
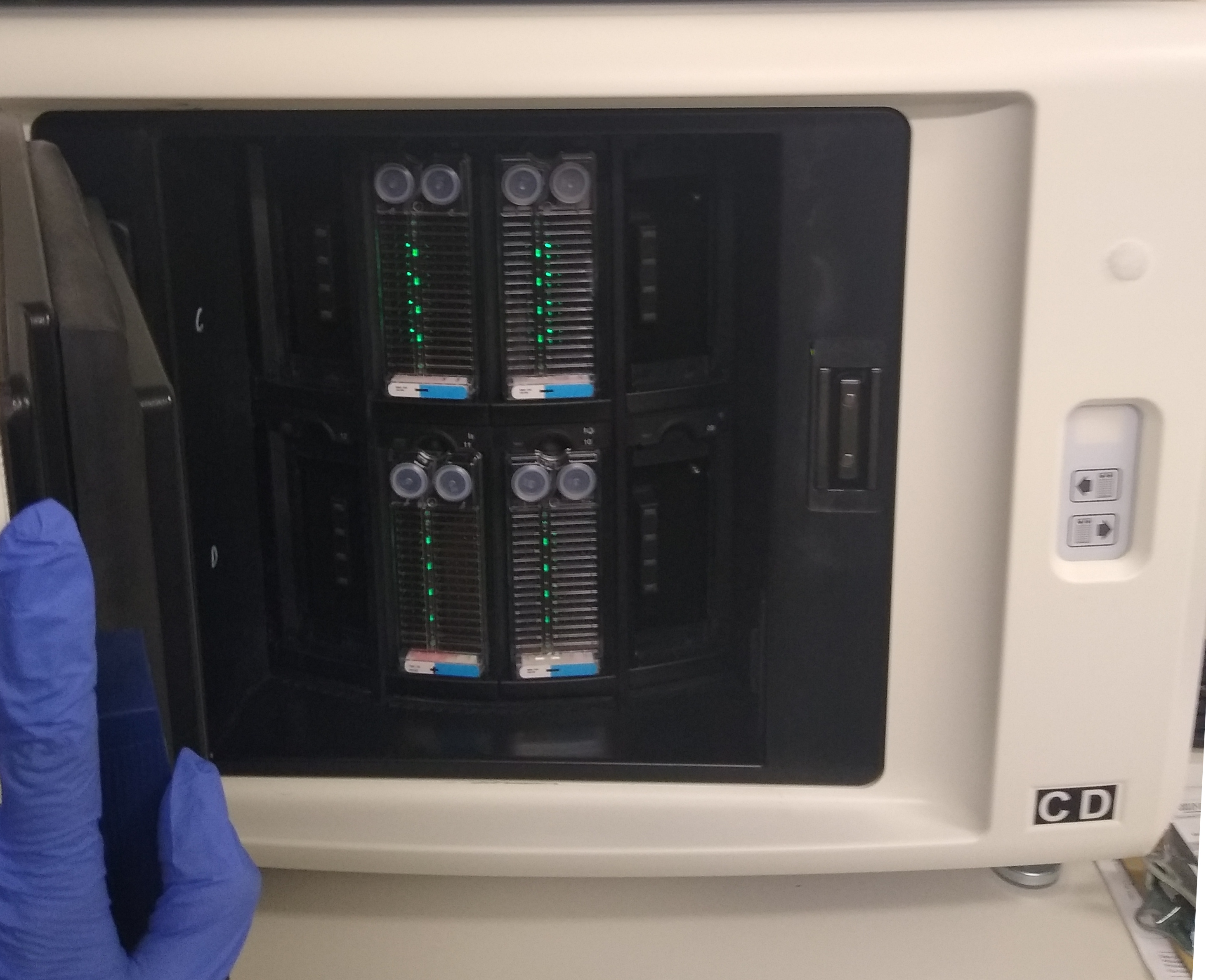
Left: Manual antibiotic sensitivity testing by the disk diffusion test. Right: Pre-formulated panels loaded into a BD Phoenix M50, an instrument used for automated antibiotic sensitivity testing.

Antimicrobial treatment of bloodstream infections is initially empiric, meaning it is based on the clinician's suspicion about the causative agent of the disease and local patterns of antimicrobial resistance. Carrying out antibiotic susceptibility testing (AST) on pathogens isolated from a blood culture allows clinicians to provide a more targeted treatment and to discontinue broad-spectrum antibiotics, which can have undesirable side effects. In traditional AST methods, such as the disk diffusion test, pure colonies of the organism are selected from the subculture plate and used to inoculate a secondary medium. These methods require overnight incubation before results can be obtained. There are automated systems which use pre-formulated antibiotic panels, measure microbial growth automatically, and determine the sensitivity results using algorithms; some of these can provide results in as little as five hours, but others require overnight incubation as well.

Rapid administration of effective antimicrobial drugs is crucial in the treatment of sepsis, so several methods have been developed to provide faster antibiotic sensitivity results. Conventional AST methods can be carried out on young growth from the subculture plate, pellets of microorganisms obtained from concentration and purification of the positive blood culture, or directly from the culture bottle. Because direct testing methods do not isolate the organisms, they do not provide accurate results if more than one microorganism is present, although this is an infrequent occurrence in blood cultures. Another source of error is the difficulty in standardizing the amount of bacteria in the sample (the inoculum), which has a profound effect on the test results.

Genetic testing can be used for rapid detection of certain antimicrobial resistance markers. Methods such as PCR and microarrays, which can be performed directly on positive blood culture samples, detect DNA sequences associated with genes that confer resistance, such as the mecA gene found in methicillin-resistant Staphylococcus aureus or the vanA and vanB genes of vancomycin-resistant enterococci. MALDI-TOF has been explored as a rapid antimicrobial sensitivity testing method; principles involve measuring microbial growth in the presence of antibiotics, identifying the breakdown of antibiotics by microbial enzymes, and detecting protein spectra associated with bacterial strains that exhibit antibiotic resistance. Some of these methods can be performed on pellets from positive blood culture bottles. However, the lack of established methodologies for AST by MALDI-TOF limits its use in clinical practice, and direct AST by MALDI-TOF, unlike genetic testing methods, had not been approved by the Food and Drug Administration as of 2018.

== Limitations ==
Blood cultures are subject to both false positive and false negative errors. In automated culture systems, identification of positive bottles is based on the detection of gases produced by cellular metabolism, so samples with high numbers of white blood cells may be reported as positive when no bacteria are present. Inspection of the growth curve produced by the instrument can help to distinguish between true and false positive cultures, but Gram staining and subculturing are still necessary for any sample that is flagged as positive.

Blood cultures can become contaminated with microorganisms from the skin or the environment, which multiply inside the culture bottle, giving the false impression that those organisms are present in the blood. Contamination of blood cultures can lead to unnecessary antibiotic treatment and longer hospital stays. The frequency of contamination can be reduced by following established protocols for blood culture collection, but it cannot be eliminated; for instance, bacteria can survive in deeper layers of the skin even after meticulous disinfection of the blood draw site. The CLSI defines an acceptable contamination rate as no greater than 3% of all blood cultures. The frequency of contamination varies widely between institutions and between different departments in the same hospital; studies have found rates ranging from 0.8 to 12.5 percent.

When faced with a positive blood culture result, clinicians must decide whether the finding represents contamination or genuine infection. Some organisms, such as S. aureus or Streptococcus pneumoniae, are usually considered to be pathogenic when detected in a blood culture, while others are more likely to represent contamination with skin flora; but even common skin organisms such as coagulase-negative staphylococci can cause bloodstream infections under certain conditions. When such organisms are present, interpretation of the culture result involves taking into account the person's clinical condition and whether or not multiple cultures are positive for the same organism.

False negatives may be caused by drawing blood cultures after the person has received antibiotics or collecting an insufficient amount of blood. The volume of blood drawn is considered the most important variable in ensuring that pathogens are detected: the more blood that is collected, the more pathogens are recovered. However, if the amount of blood collected far exceeds the recommended volume, bacterial growth may be inhibited by natural inhibitors present in the blood and an inadequate amount of growth medium in the bottle. Over-filling of blood culture bottles may also contribute to iatrogenic anemia.

Not all pathogens are easily detected by conventional blood culture methods. Particularly fastidious organisms, such as Brucella and Mycobacterium species, may require prolonged incubation times or special culture media. Some organisms are exceedingly difficult to culture or do not grow in culture at all, so serology testing or molecular methods such as PCR are preferred if infection with these organisms is suspected.

== History ==
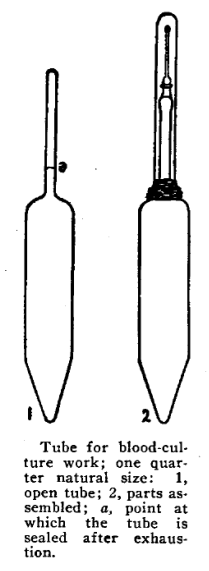
An early vacuum tube system for blood culture collection, described by C.E. Simon & C.C.W. Judd in 1915

Early blood culture methods were labour-intensive. One of the first known procedures, published in 1869, recommended that leeches be used to collect blood from the patient. A microbiology textbook from 1911 noted that decontamination of the draw site and equipment could take over an hour, and that due to a lack of effective methods for preserving blood, the cultures would sometimes have to be prepared at the patient's bedside. In addition to subculturing the broth, some protocols specified that the blood be mixed with melted agar and the mixture poured into a petri dish. In 1915, a blood culture collection system consisting of glass vacuum tubes containing glucose broth and an anticoagulant was described. Robert James Valentine Pulvertaft published a seminal work on blood cultures in 1930, specifying—among other insights—an optimal blood-to-broth ratio of 1:5, which is still accepted today. The use of SPS as an anticoagulant and preservative was introduced in the 1930s and 40s and resolved some of the logistical issues with earlier methods. From the 1940s through the 1980s, a great deal of research was carried out on broth formulations and additives, with the goal of creating a growth medium that could accommodate all common bloodstream pathogens.

In 1947, M.R. Castañeda invented a "biphasic" culture bottle for the identification of Brucella species, which contained both broth and an agar slant, allowing the agar to be easily subcultured from the broth; this was a precursor of some contemporary systems for manual blood cultures. E.G. Scott in 1951 published a protocol described as "the advent of the modern blood culture set". Scott's method involved inoculating blood into two rubber-sealed glass bottles; one for aerobes and one for anaerobes. The aerobic bottle contained trypticase soy broth and an agar slant, and the anaerobic bottle contained thioglycollate broth. The lysis-centrifugation method was introduced in 1917 by Mildred Clough, but it was rarely used in clinical practice until commercial systems were developed in the mid-1970s.

Automated blood culture systems first became available in the 1970s. The earliest of these—the BACTEC systems, produced by Johnston Laboratories (now Becton Dickinson)—used culture broths containing nutrients labelled with radioactive isotopes. Microbes that fed on these substrates would produce radioactive carbon dioxide, and growth could be detected by monitoring its concentration. Before this technique was applied to blood cultures, it had been proposed by NASA as a method for detecting life on Mars. Throughout the 1970s and 80s several manufacturers attempted to detect microbial growth by measuring changes in the electrical conductivity of the culture medium, but none of these methods were commercially successful.

A major issue with the early BACTEC systems was that they produced radioactive waste, which required special disposal procedures, so in 1984 a new generation of BACTEC instruments was released that used spectrophotometry to detect CO_{2}. The BacT/ALERT system, which indirectly detects production of CO_{2} by measuring the decrease in the medium's pH, was approved for use in the US in 1991. Unlike the BACTEC systems available at the time, the BacT/ALERT did not require a needle to be introduced into the bottle for sampling; this reduced the frequency of contamination and made it the first system to provide truly continuous monitoring of blood cultures. This non-invasive measurement method was adopted in 1992 by the BACTEC 9000 series, which used fluorescent indicators to detect pH changes. The Difco ESP, a direct predecessor of the contemporary VersaTREK system which detects gas production by measuring pressure changes, was also first approved in 1992. By 1996, an international study found that 55% of 466 laboratories surveyed were using the BACTEC or BacT/ALERT systems, with other automated systems accounting for 10% of the total.
