= Record Store Day in Portland, Oregon =

The semi-annual event Record Store Day (RSD) is celebrated in the American city of Portland, Oregon. The event is held each April and some local business also commemorate RSD on Black Friday. Terry Currier of Music Millennium has been credited as a co-founder of the event, which started in the 2000s. Other participating local record shops include 2nd Avenue Records and Jackpot Records. In 2009, mayor Sam Adams issued a proclamation recognizing RSD. In 2026, Jordan Michelman of Willamette Week wrote, "anyone who's browsed the stacks at Music Millennium on a Friday night knows that here in Portland, every day is Record Store Day".

== History ==
=== 2000s ===
Terry Currier of the music retailer Music Millennium was among advocates who started RSD in 2007 or 2008. According to Oregon Public Broadcasting, "The idea was not only to promote the lagging record industry but also to celebrate the culture of independent stores." Music Millennium opens early and hosts large crowds, live performances, and special releases for the recurring event.

The independent record shop Jackpot Records has also participated since 2008. In 2009, mayor Sam Adams issued a proclamation declaring April 18 as RSD. He also played records at Jackpot, which hosted an after hours party called "Record Store Day into Night". The metal band Queensrÿche signed copies of the album American Soldier at Music Millennium in 2009. The local doughnut company Voodoo Doughnut offered special RSD-designed options in 2009.

=== 2010s ===
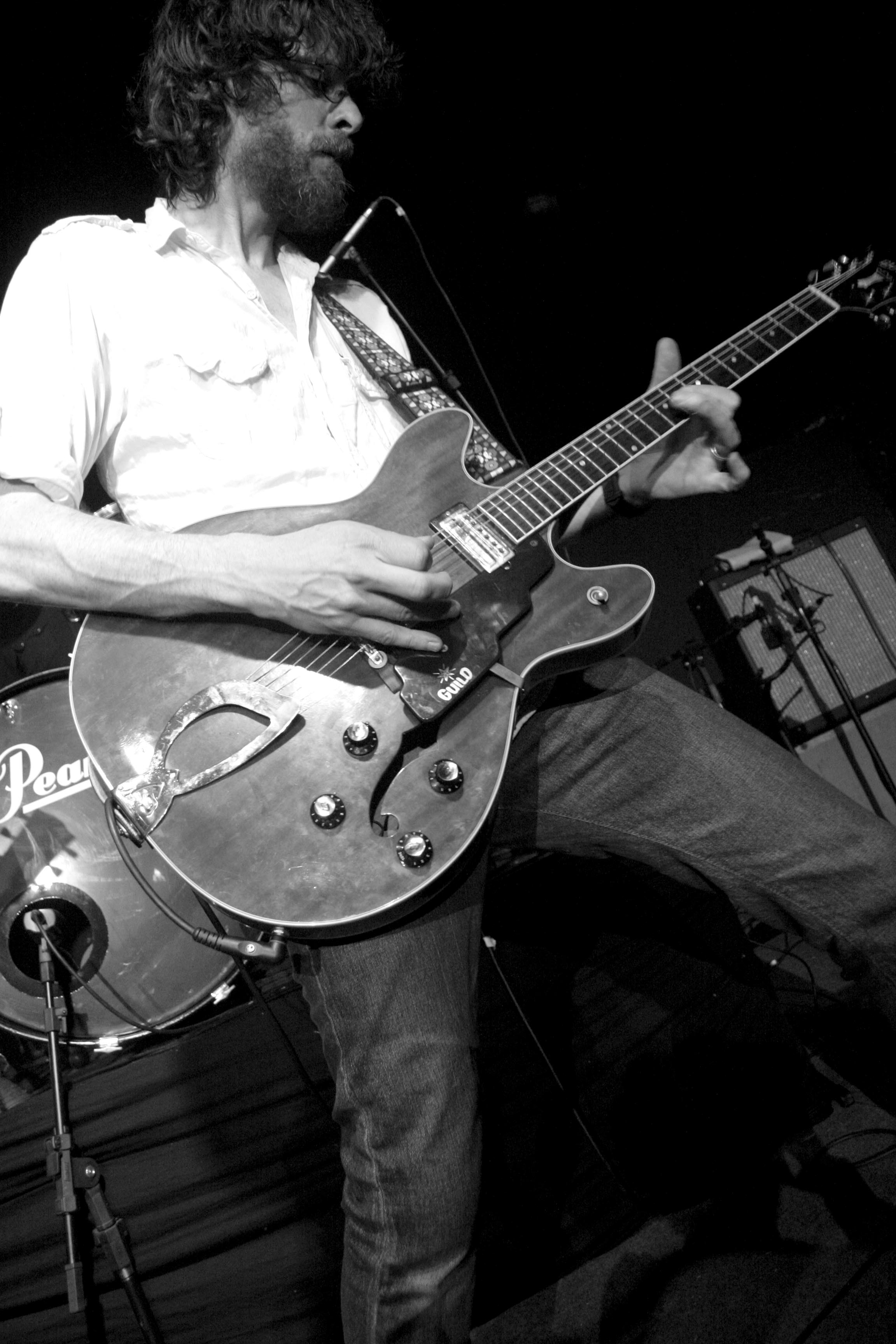
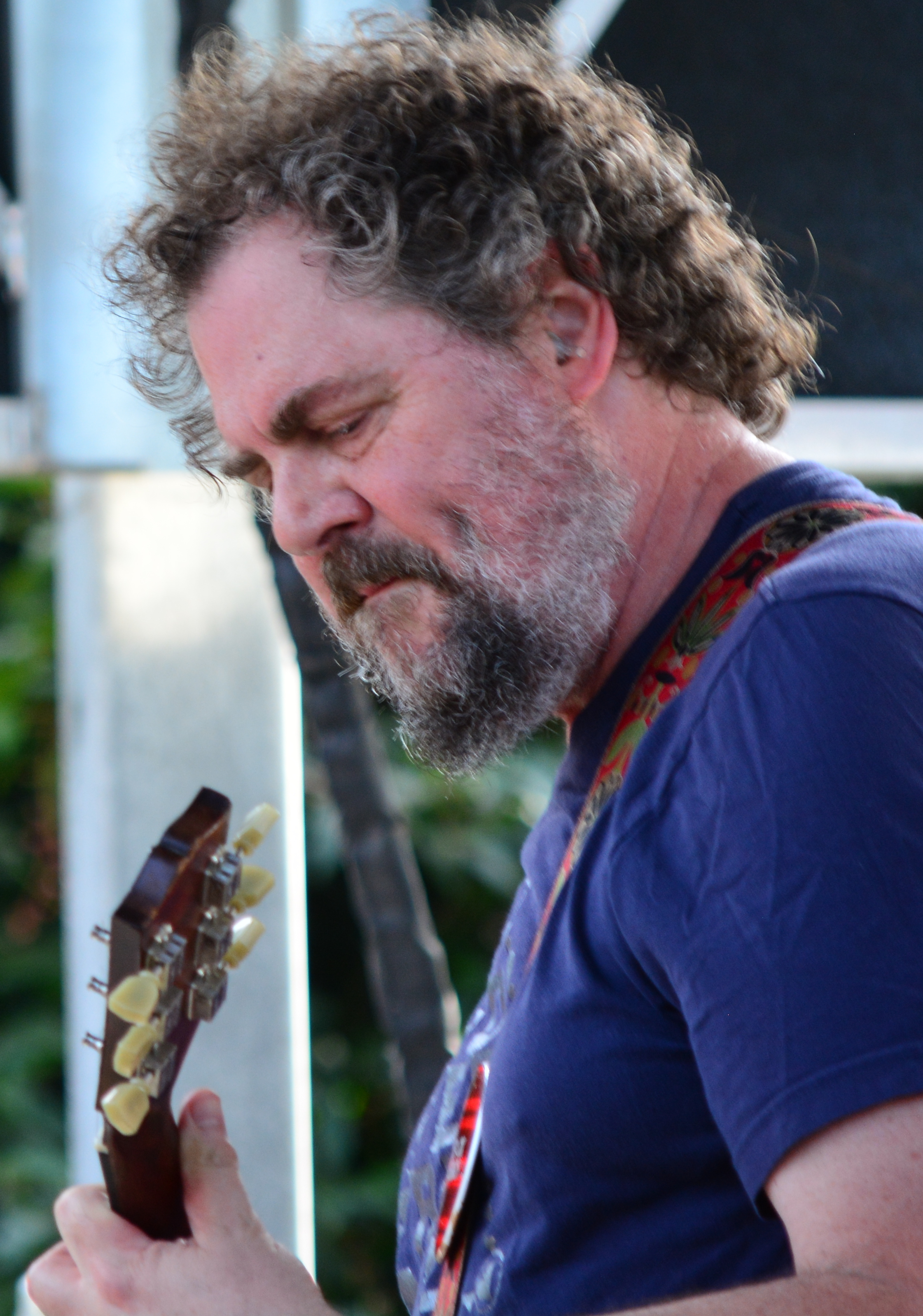
Steve Turner (left, pictured in 2007) of the rock band Mudhoney and Patterson Hood (right, pictured in 2022) have appeared at Jackpot Records for Record Store Day.
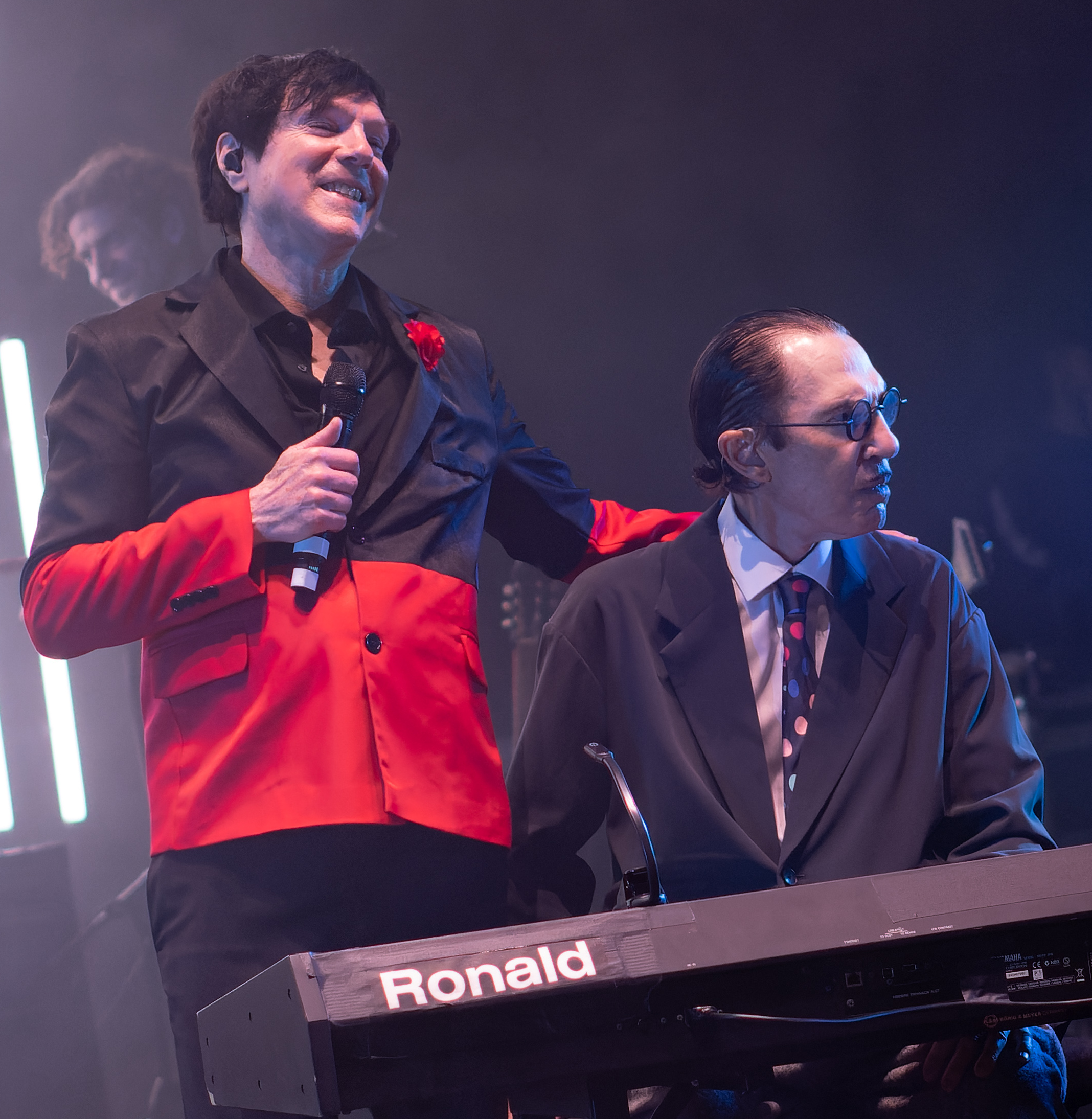
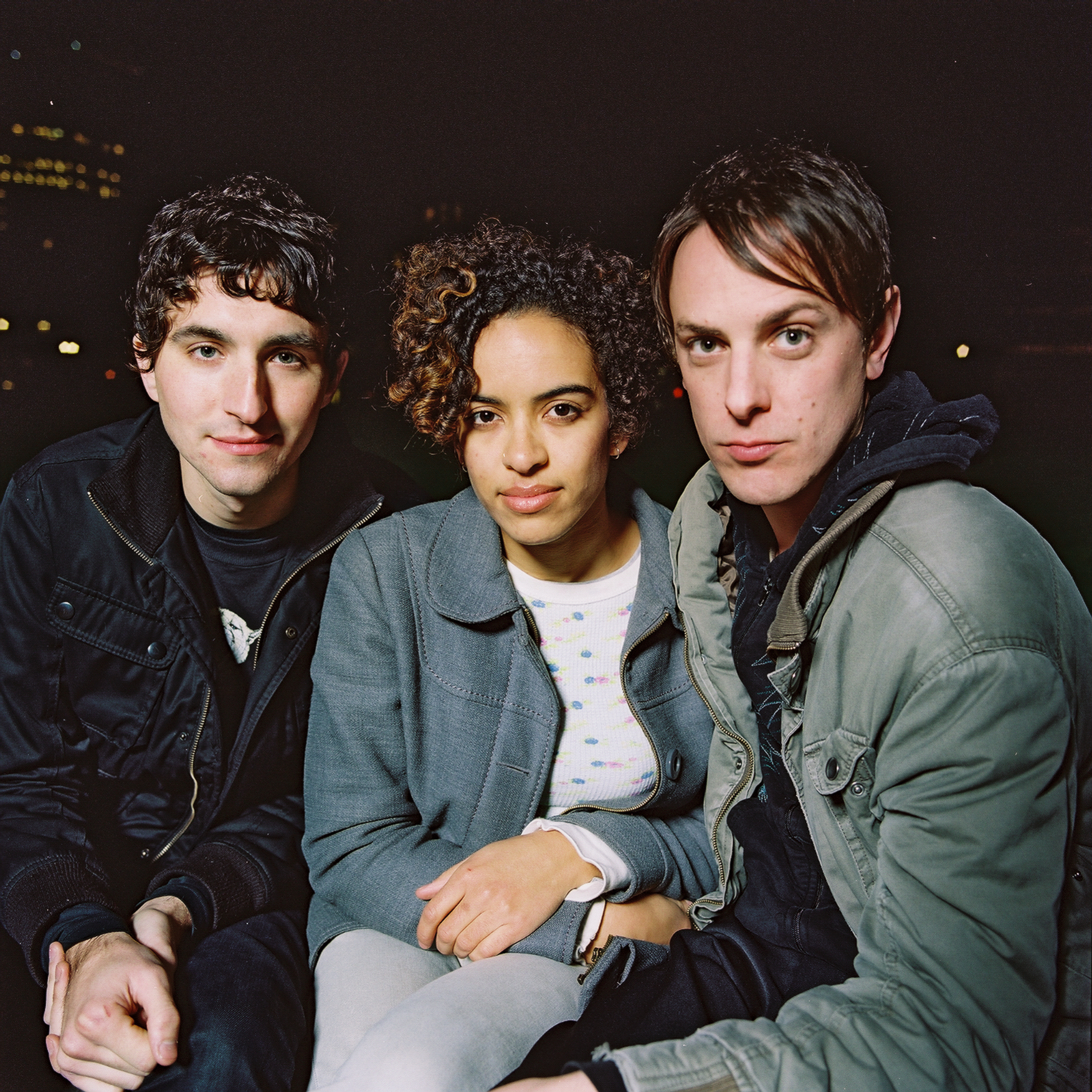
Sparks (left, pictured in 2023) and The Thermals (right, pictured in 2009) appeared at Music Millennium for the event in 2013.

In 2011, Jackpot hosted Steve Turner, the guitarist for the rock band Mudhoney, to play records. The shop also hosted the rock band Red Fang, other disc jockeys (DJs), and a truck operated by Voodoo Doughnut. Turner returned to play music at Jackpot in 2012 and 2013. The shop offered 500 limited-edition vinyl box sets of early recordings by musician Jandek and released 500 copies of the 1997 studio album Zaireeka by the rock band The Flaming Lips. Music Millennium hosted the musical duo Sparks and the indie rock band The Thermals in 2013.

2nd Avenue Records, Jackpot, and Music Millennium were among local businesses participating again in 2014. Jackpot hosted Turner and a psychic to predict "which one-dollar records will be given out for free". The band Black Prairie and musician Eric D. Johnson appeared at Music Millennium. In 2015, Jackpot hosted DJs and a clairvoyant to "predict" what customers would buy, as well as tote bags and coffee beans. The rock bands Dawes and Dead Moon performed at Music Millennium, which also offered free beer.

Jackpot offered approximately 400 limited-edition vinyl releases in 2016. Hundreds of people visited Music Millennium, which also offered limited-edition releases as well as free coffee and muffins. Singer-songwriter Bonnie Raitt also appeared for a meet-and-greet. In 2017, Jackpot had DJs and offered coffee and energy drinks to guests. Music Millennium hosted the rock band Portugal. The Man and singer-songwriter Joel Rafael, as well as gift bags and free coffee. Tender Loving Empire had DJs, giveaways, and free alcoholic beverages.

Local participants in 2018 included 2nd Avenue, Music Millennium, and Jackpot, which again hosted Turner as well as singer-songwriter Patterson Hood of the rock band Drive-By Truckers. Jackpot also offered canvas tote bags, drinks, and approximately 500 limited-edition releases. The pop rock band The Minus 5 performed at Music Millennium in 2019. The shop also offered gift bags and refreshments.

=== 2020s ===
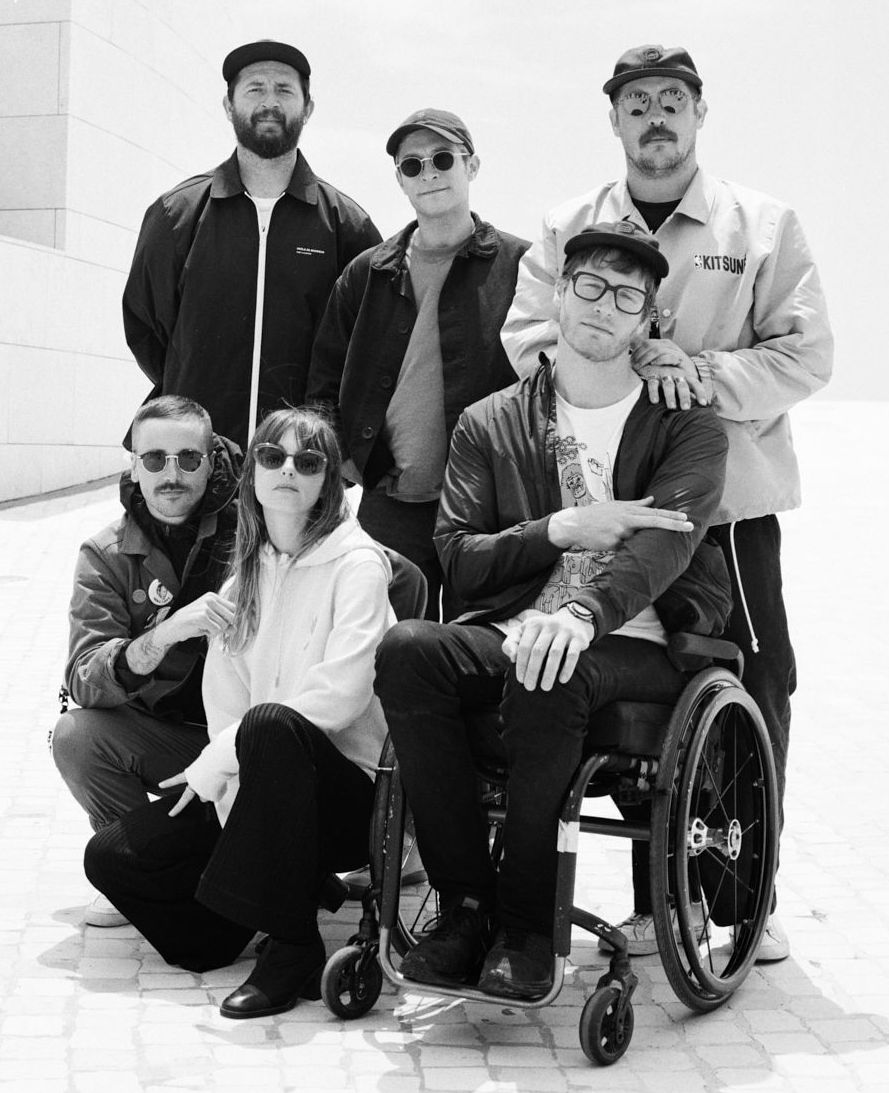
Portugal. The Man (pictured in 2020) signed autographs at Music Millennium in 2021.

Music Millennium hosted Portugal. The Man for autograph signing in 2021. In 2023, Jackpot had exclusive vinyl, DJs, and a psychic. Music Millennium had 300 limited vinyl releases, gift bags for the first 300 customers, and free coffee and muffins.

Local participants in 2024 included 2nd Avenue, Music Millennium, and Jackpot, which again hosted Turner to play records. Jackpot's in-house label also released four records, including the 1968 self-titled album by the psychedelic rock band SRC, which had not been released on vinyl since 1969. Music Millennium gave away custom posters and socks, as well as coffee and muffins. Jackpot hosted DJ sets again in 2025.

In April 2026, dozens of Portland businesses participated in RSD, including 2nd Avenue, Jackpot, and Music Millennium, where the first 350 customers received gift bags and commemorative posters designed by students at Portland State University. Jackpot gave away buttons and coffee, again hosting a psychic as well as multiple DJs. Music Millennium also offered coffee, gift bags, and coupons for Voodoo Doughnut. The business also collaborated with Baerlic Brewing Co., John's Marketplace, and Pourtlandia Project on a special beer commemorating the event. Additionally, Music Millennium was among stores nationally offering advance in-shop listening parties for Bruno Mars's album The Romantic on February 25, ahead of the main event (Mars was named a RSD "ambassador" for 2026).

== See also ==
- Culture of Portland, Oregon
