= SRC =

SRC may refer to:

== Education ==
- Sid Richardson College, residential college of Rice University campus, Houston, Texas, USA
- Southern Regional College, a higher education college in Northern Ireland
- Spoon River College, a community college in Canton, Illinois, USA
- Students' representative council, of an institution
- Sulaiman Al Rajhi Colleges, a university in Al Bukayriyah, Saudi Arabia

== Music ==
- SRC (band), a rock band from the late 1960s
  - SRC (album), the 1968 album by SRC
- SRC Records, an American record label
- Snake River Conspiracy, an American industrial rock band

== Science and technology ==
- DEC Systems Research Center, the former research laboratory of Digital Equipment Corporation
- Sample rate conversion, a technique used in converting between different formats of digitized analog data
- Saskatchewan Research Council, a technology corporation
- Spring Research Conference, an annual conference sponsored by the American Statistical Association (ASA) Section on Physical and Engineering Sciences (SPES) and the Institute of Mathematical Statistics (IMS).
- Science Research Council, earlier name of the Science and Engineering Research Council, a former British government agency
- Semiconductor Research Corporation, an American non-profit research consortium
- Set redundancy compression, compression methods for similar images
- Short rotation coppice, an energy crop
- Src (gene), a family of proto-oncogenic tyrosine kinases
  - SRC, the human orthologue of the Src gene
- SRC Computers, a company founded by Seymour Cray
- SRC Inc. (formerly Syracuse Research Corporation), a not-for-profit research company based in Syracuse, New York
- Stockholm Resilience Centre (SRC), a research centre on resilience and sustainability science
- Synchrotron Radiation Center, a former physics laboratory of the University of Wisconsin–Madison
- Source code (plain text representation of a computer program) is often abbreviated with and stored in a folder called src

== Transport ==
- Santragachi Junction railway station (station code SRC), Santragachhi, Howrah, India
- Streatham Common railway station (National Rail station code SRC), London, England

== Other ==
- Sahrawi Republic Cup, top knockout tournament in Western Sahara
- Scottish Rally Championship, a motorsport series in Scotland
- Sengoku Raiden Championship, a mixed martial arts competition series
- Short Range Certificate, internationally valid certificate issued to marine VHF radio station operators
- Singapore Red Cross Society, the Red Cross society for Singapore
- Sonic Racing: CrossWorlds, a 2025 video game
- Société Radio-Canada, French name for the Canadian Broadcasting Corporation
- Space Research Corporation, founded by Gerald Bull
- States Reorganisation Commission, Indian government commission
- Super Rygbi Cymru, the second level of rugby union in Wales and the highest purely domestic level
