= Holy Trinity Barbecue =

Defunct restaurant in Portland, Oregon, U.S.

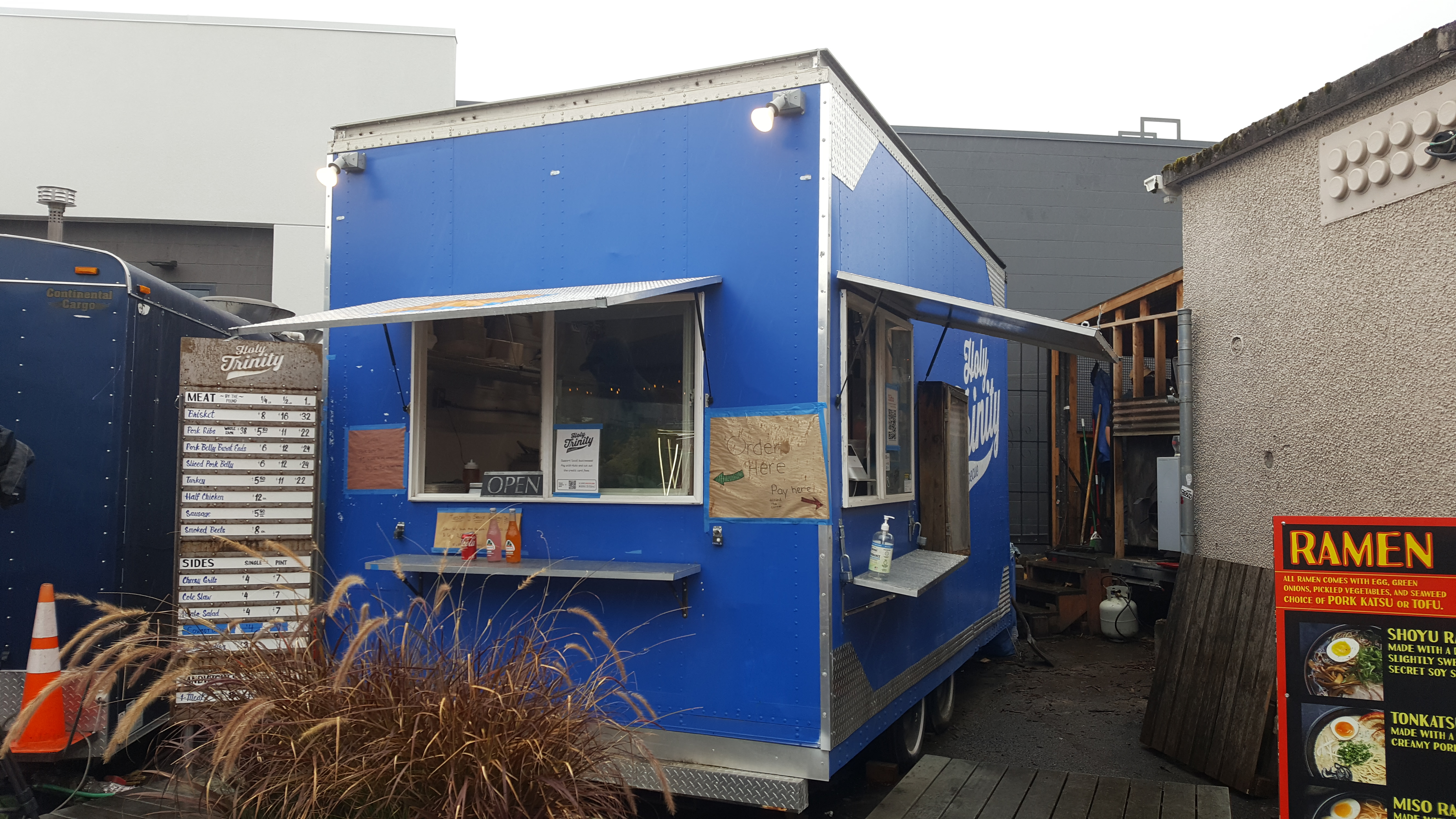
- The food cart's exterior in 2021
- Interactive map of Holy Trinity Barbecue

Restaurant information
- Established: May 2019; 7 years ago
- Closed: October 23, 2021; 4 years ago
- Owner: Kyle Rensmeyer
- Chef: Kyle Rensmeyer
- Location: 3582 Southeast Powell Boulevard, Portland, Multnomah, Oregon, 97202, United States
- Coordinates: 45.4965°N 122.6267°W
- Website: holytrinitybarbecue.com

Holy Trinity Barbecue (sometimes Holy Trinity BBQ) was a barbecue restaurant in Portland, Oregon. Kyle Rensmeyer established the business as a food cart in southeast Portland's neighborhood Creston-Kenilworth in 2019. Holy Trinity and its barbecue garnered a positive reception; The Oregonian deemed Holy Trinity one of the city's best new food carts and Portland Business Journal said its barbecue was "hailed as among the best" in the United States. The restaurant closed in October 2022 and Rensmeyer has since held pop-ups.

== Description ==
Holy Trinity operated from a food cart in a parking lot on Powell Boulevard in southeast Portland's neighborhood Creston-Kenilworth. The cart was part of a pod outside John's Marketplace, which operated in a building Original Taco House previously occupied. It was named for three constant menu items: smoked sausage, ribs, and smoked brisket. (Note: Other sources say that the "holy trinity" of American barbecue consists of beef brisket, pulled pork, and spare ribs.) In 2019, David Landsel of Food & Wine wrote:

The little blue trailer that ... Holy Trinity Barbecue calls home is not a thing one just happens to run across; it hides behind approximately six construction fences, adjacent to a shuttered strip mall, currently under redevelopment, out along one of the last great unwashed commercial thoroughfares, Powell Boulevard, in Portland's increasingly scrubbed-up Southeast.

The menu included Texas-style brisket, Czech sausages, pulled pork, and ribs. Sides included cheesy grits, pickles, and banana pudding.

== History ==
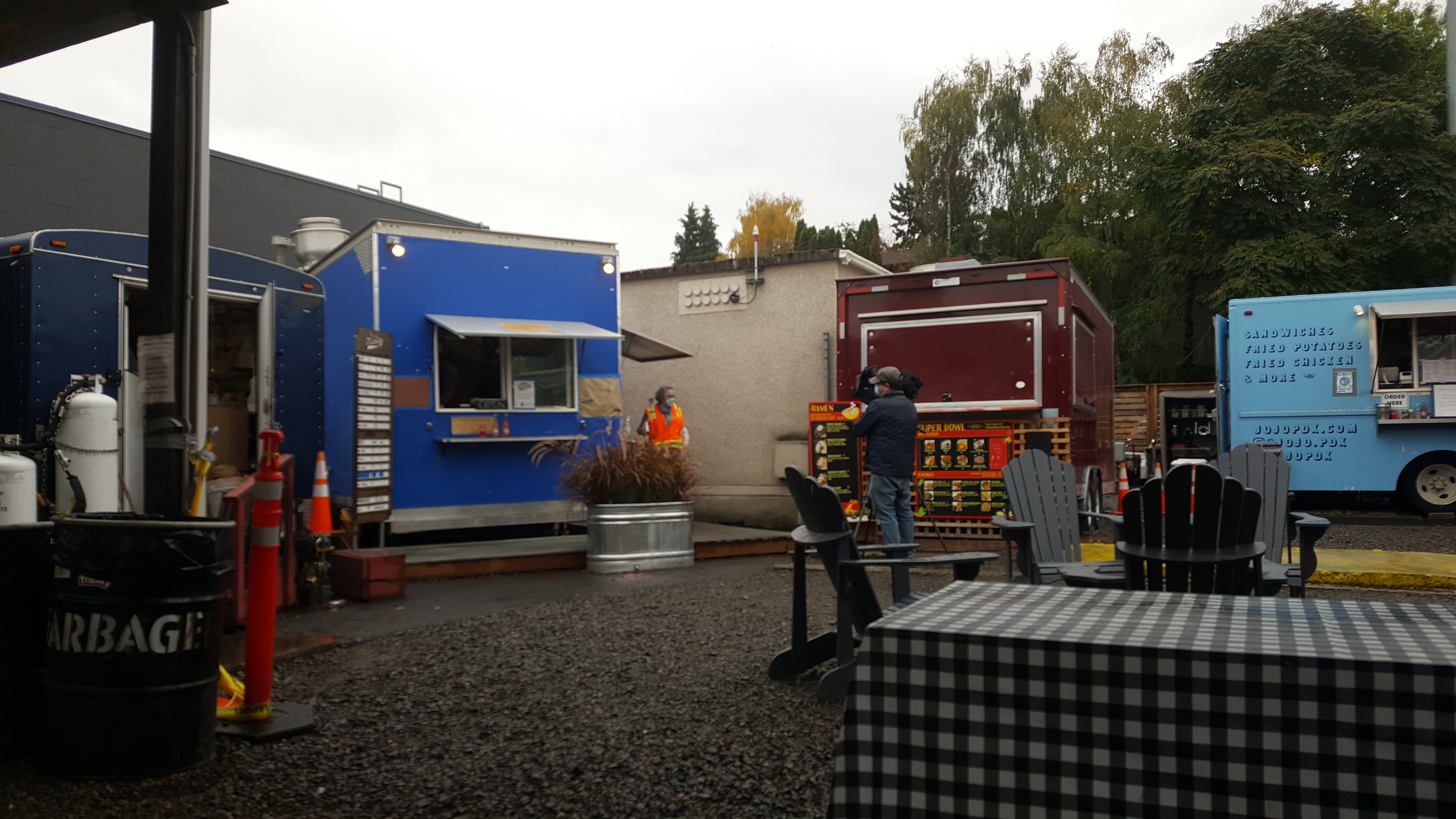
The food cart pod outside John's Marketplace in October 2021

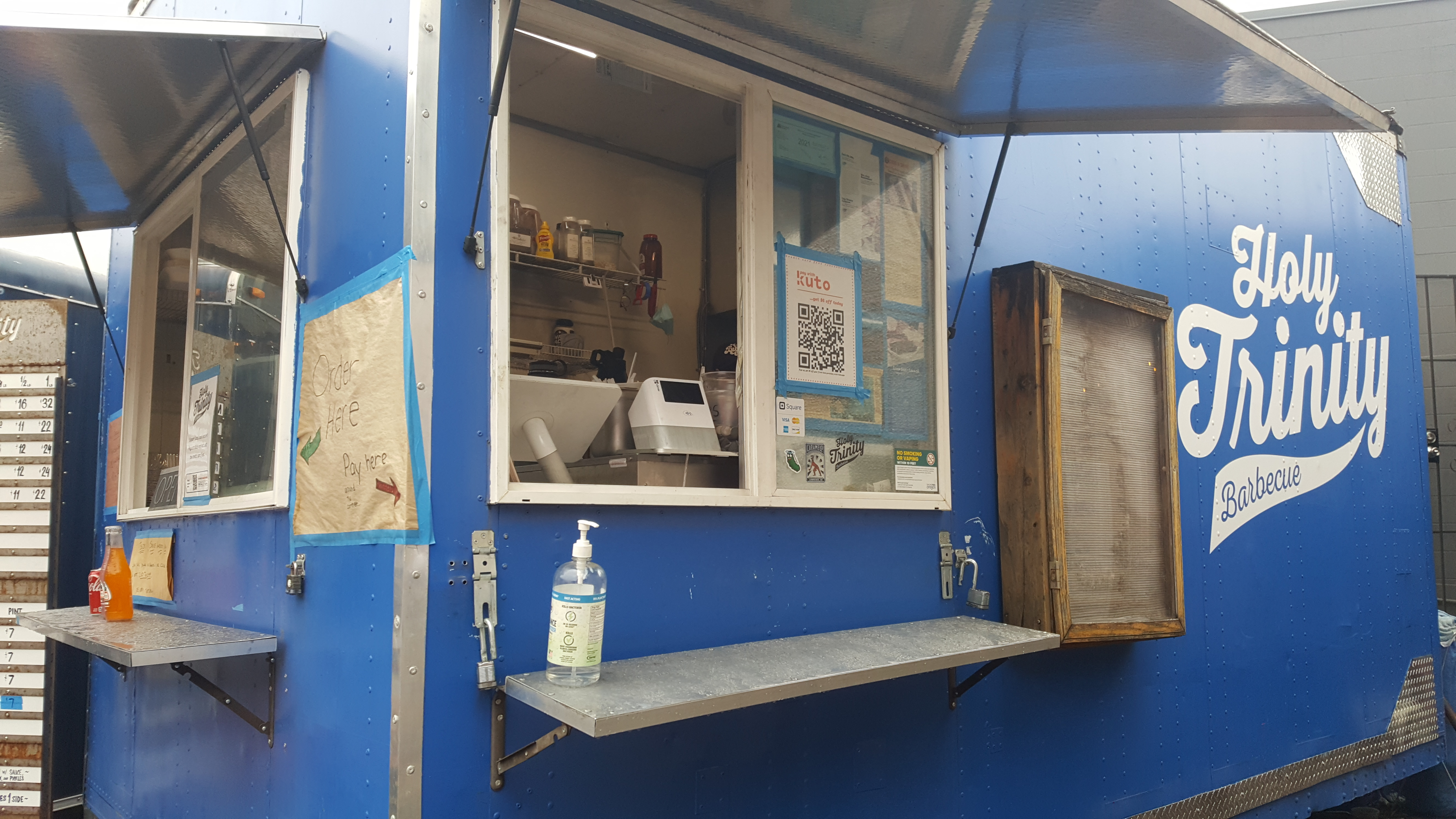

Kyle Rensmeyer opened Holy Trinity in May 2019. The business initially operated on weekends, and added Thursday and Friday service in August 2019. Tortillas were sourced from Caramelo Tortillas in Lawrence, Kansas, as of 2019.

Like many businesses, Holy Trinity's business model changed during the COVID-19 pandemic. Holy Trinity sold chilled and vacuum-packed meats in bulk via delivery until the health department received a complaint. The delivery operation was shut down and following a trial in late March, Rensmeyer and an employee "[established] a protocol that [allowed] for a relatively risk-free pickup situation and minimal wait times". Holy Trinity offered Thanksgiving options as take out. Rensmeyer closed the food cart for two days during a heat wave in July 2021, resulting in a loss of $7,000.

In October 2021, Rensmeyer confirmed plans to close on October 23. Christopher Bjorke of Portland Business Journal said the business "won praise from here to Texas" but closed "amid flagging sales". Holy Trinity continued to operate as a pop-up, including a dinner collaboration at Renata and a stint at Culmination Brewing in May 2022.

== Reception ==
Michael Russell of The Oregonian deemed Holy Trinity one of Portland's best new food carts. In 2019, the business was included in Portland Mercury's list of the city's five "most essential" barbecue carts, as well as Portland Monthly's overview of the best new restaurants and "standout" carts. Writers for the magazine said, "Five minutes after Holy Trinity opens, a line already snakes outside of Rensmeyer’s royal blue cart, which opened in May, sparking debate over which PDX food cart serves the best Texas barbecue ... Whatever the alchemy behind Rensmeyer's seemingly simple meat-craft, it's a winning formula: for our money it's one of the best spots, if not the best, to get Texas barbecue in the city."

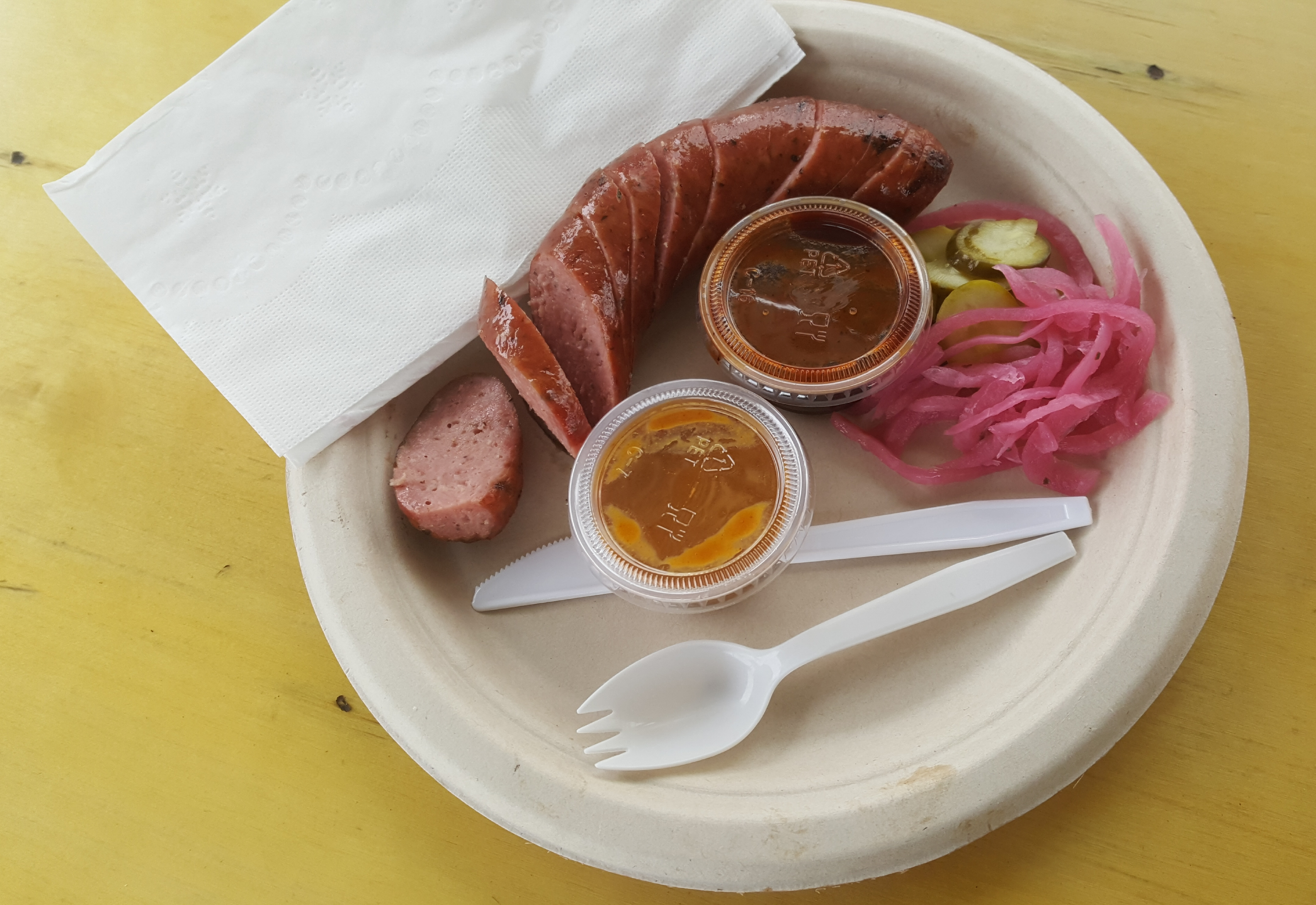
Sausage

Comparing the restaurant to Matt's BBQ in 2019, Thrillist's Pete Cottell said Holy Trinity "is giving Matt's a run for its money as the resident siren for authentic 'cue-deprived Texans". Holy Trinity was a finalist in the Food Cart of the Year category of Eater Portland's 2019 Eater Awards. Brooke Jackson-Glidden said, "Portland is already spoiled on the barbecue front; it didn't need another hardcore talent with a smoker. But the Texas barbecue at Jojo's neighbor, Holy Trinity, is far better than it needs to be, with gorgeous brisket, well-seasoned sausages, and knockout green-chile-cheese grits." She also named Rensmeyer a "rising star" in the city's food and drink scene.

In 2021, Jackson-Glidden and Nick Woo included Holy Trinity in Eater Portland's list of 15 outstanding Portland food carts. She also included the business in a 2021 list of the city's 38 "essential" eateries. Covering Holy Trinity's pending closure, Christopher Bjorke of Portland Business Journal said the business "had won local recognition for its food as well as being named as one of the best Texas-style barbecues outside the state by Texas Monthly". Portland Mercury's food columnist Janey Wong called the closure "a gut-wrenching loss". Bill Oakley also considered the closure a loss, and Jackson-Glidden wrote: "it's hard for me to ignore the way my heart broke when Holy Trinity announced its closure. Considering its brief tenure in Portland, I have so many fond memories of eating Holy Trinity beef ribs, those green chile grits, that banana pudding. I'll admit, I'm still holding out hope it returns eventually, in one form or another."

== See also ==
- Barbecue in the United States
- Impact of the COVID-19 pandemic on the meat industry in the United States
- Impact of the COVID-19 pandemic on the restaurant industry in the United States
- List of barbecue restaurants
- List of food trucks
