= Jackpot Records =

Independent record shop and label in Portland, Oregon, U.S.

Coordinates: 45.511932°N 122.62719°W

- Logo

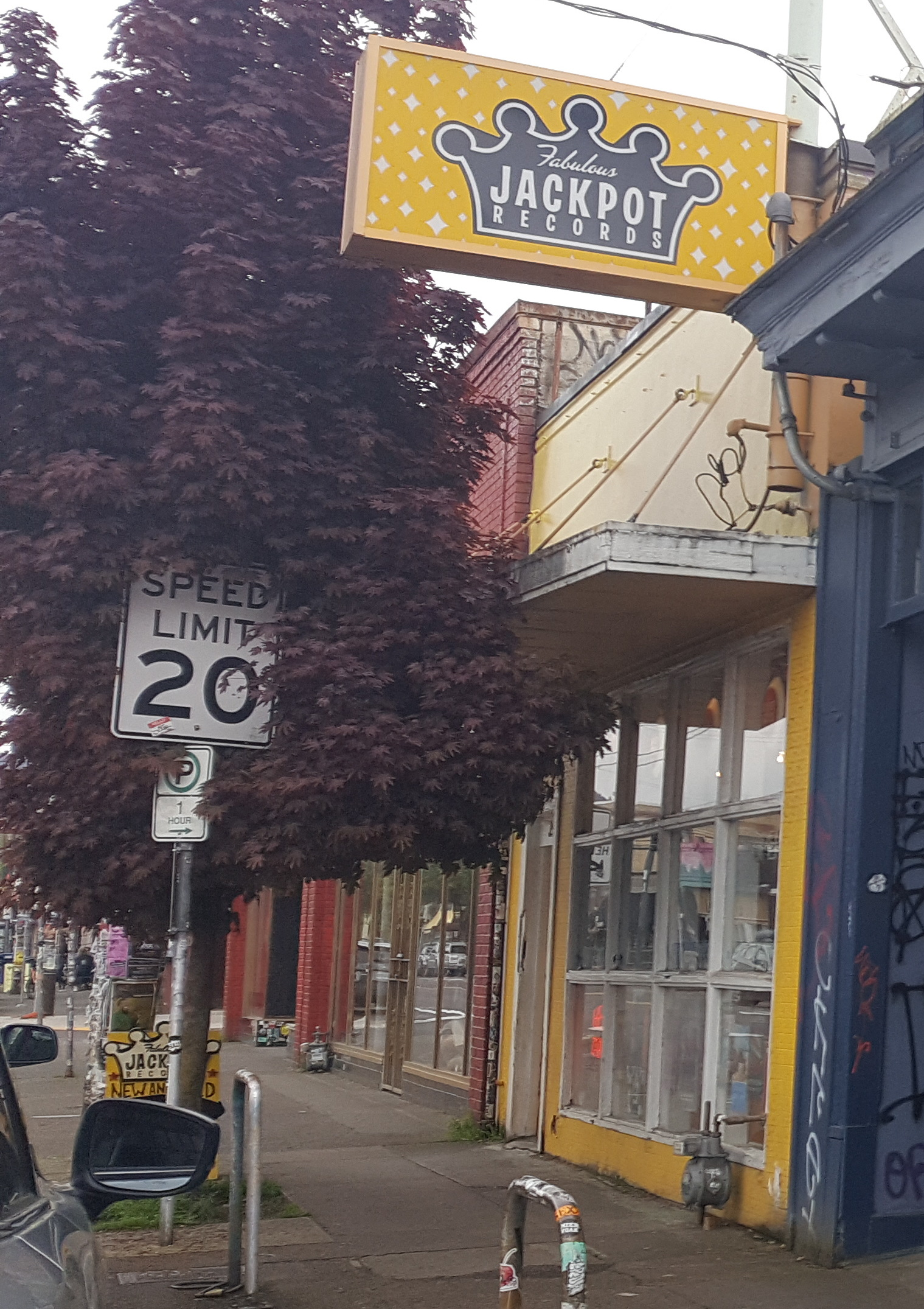
- The shop's exterior in 2022
- Founded: 1997 in Portland, Oregon, U.S.
- Headquarters: 3574 Southeast Hawthorne Boulevard, Portland, Oregon, U.S.
- Website: jackpotrecords.com

Jackpot Records is an independent record shop in Portland, Oregon, United States. Established in 1997, it operates on Hawthorne Boulevard in southeast Portland's Richmond neighborhood. In 2004, the business began operating a record label of the same name. Portland Monthly has said Jackpot Records "does tend toward the obscure". Previously, the business also operated on West Burnside Street in downtown Portland.

== History ==
Jackpot Records was established in October 1997. Isaac Slusarenko is the owner. The shop has appeared in the television series Portlandia.

In 2015, Jackpot Records added 125,000 used vinyl pieces to its inventory. This was one of the largest record purchases in U.S. history. The business has hosted activities and offered specials for Record Store Day.

Deerhunter, Ghostface Killah, Sleater-Kinney, Rodriguez, and The Black Keys have performed at the store. Bruce Springsteen visited the shop in 2026.

The business has hosted film festivals. Previously, the business operated a location on West Burnside Street in downtown Portland.

== Record label ==
The business also operates a record label of the same name, which was established in 2004. According to KOIN, the label focuses on "high-quality re-issues of older vinyl" and releases vinyl from both new and established artists. Jackpot Records has released a compilation of vintage pinball music, as well as a re-issue of Willie Nelson's debut album.

== Reception ==
Rolling Stone included the business in a 2010 list of the top 25 record shops in the U.S. Dazed has included Jackpot Records in a list of the nation's best independent record shops. Spin has described the shop as "legendary".

== See also ==
- 2nd Avenue Records
- Independent record label
- Music Millennium
- Record Store Day in Portland, Oregon
