= Music Millennium =

Music retailer in Oregon, United States

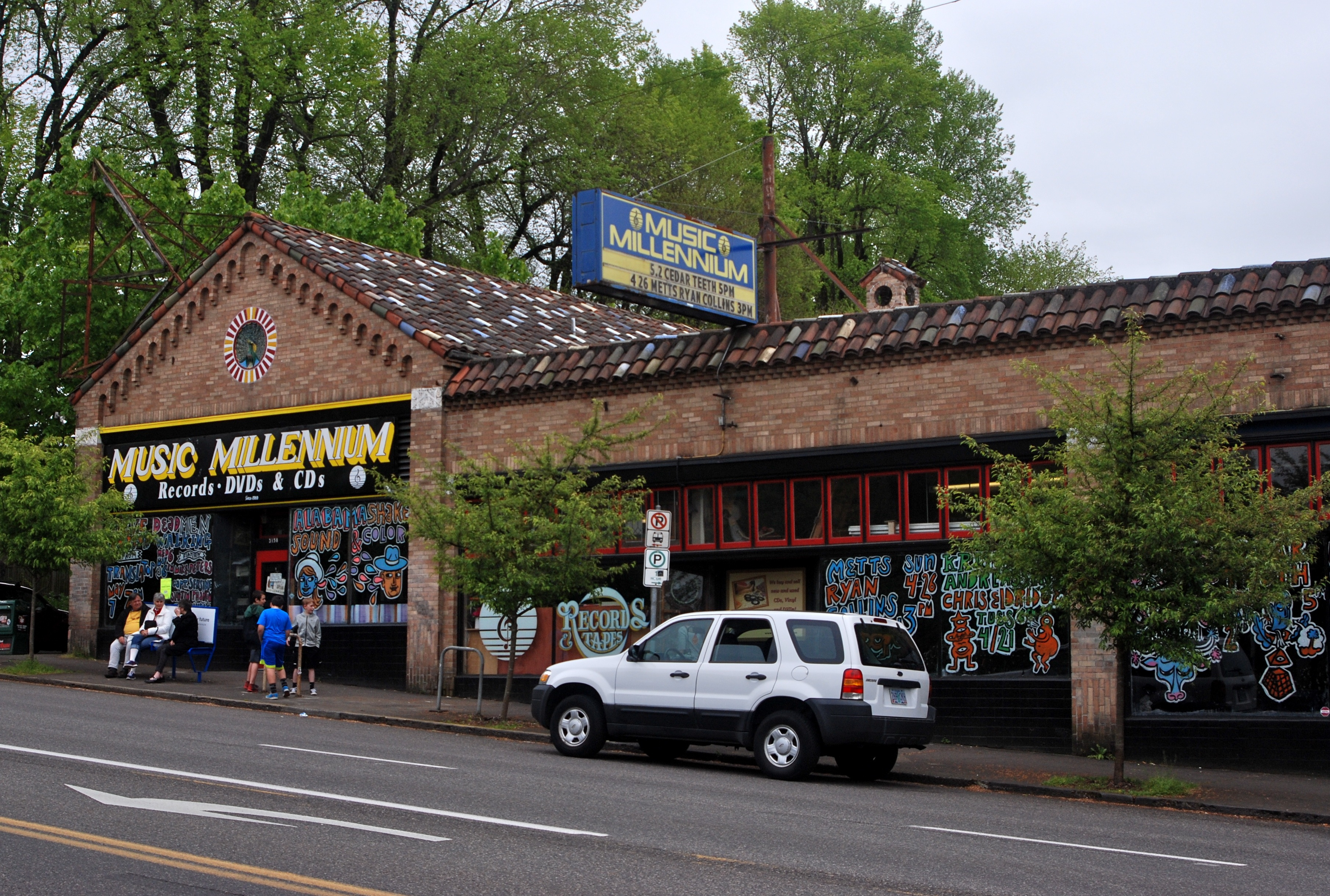
- Exterior of Music Millennium's original location on East Burnside Street in 2015
- Industry: Retail
- Founded: 1969
- Founders: Don McLeod, Laureen McLeod, Dan Lissy and Patty Lissy
- Headquarters: Portland, Oregon, U.S.
- Key people: Terry Currier (current owner)
- Website: www.musicmillennium.com

Music Millennium is an independent record store located in Portland, Oregon. It was opened by Don McLeod, his wife Laureen, and Dan and Patty Lissy in 1969. It is currently the largest and oldest record store in the Pacific Northwest.

== History ==
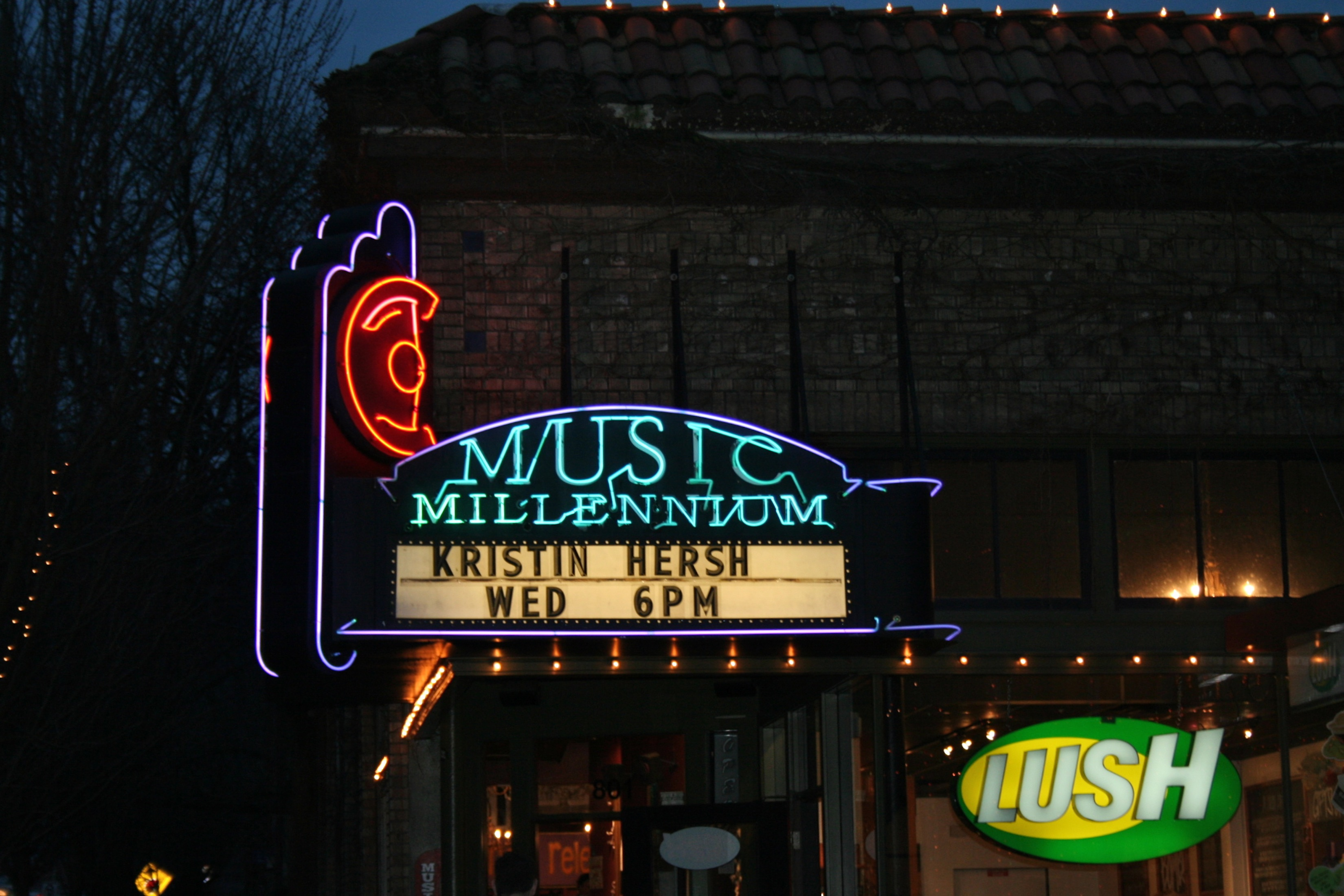
Neon sign and marquee at the chain's former main store (1977–2007), in Northwest Portland

At one time, Music Millennium had three stores: one at the original eastside location, which opened on March 15, 1969, a store in northwest Portland's Northwest District, and a classical music store located next door to the main eastside location called Classical Millennium that opened in 1977. Terry Currier acquired the business in 1996 from McLeod's estate following Don McLeod's death.

The northwest location was a pioneer in in-store performances, which started in 1989 as part of the business's 20th anniversary celebration. Currier later coined the term "Keep Portland Weird", which has become a rally slogan for the city and its culture. He is currently considered "The Father of Portland's Weird Movement".

The northwest location closed in September 2007. In 2009, Music Millennium was ranked ninth in Spin magazine's list of the fifteen best independent record stores in the country. A year later, The Oregonian described Music Millennium as an iconic Portland business and a "national leader in the music-selling industry".

=== Feud with Garth Brooks ===
During a 1993 feud with Garth Brooks, Currier barbecued the country star's album In Pieces after removing Music Millennium's entire collection of his other CDs, cassettes, and LPs. Dubbed "The Barbecue for Retail Freedom", the event was staged to protest Brooks's stance against used record stores selling his music. As of 2017, Music Millennium was still refusing to stock Brooks's albums. The store continues to host an annual "Customer Appreciation BBQ" every August and the feud helped inspire the foundation of Record Store Day in 2007.

=== Millennium Enterprises, Inc. v. Millennium Music, L.P ===
In a lawsuit dismissed in 1999, Music Millennium filed a trademark claim against Millennium Music in Charleston, South Carolina, asking them to change the name of their business. Millennium Music operated two stores in South Carolina and Terry Currier believed it caused too much confusion and was concerned about "unwanted competition". The court held that simply having an interactive website was not enough to have personal jurisdiction.

== Reception ==
Music Millennium won in the Best Record Store category of Willamette Week's annual 'Best of Portland' readers' poll in 2007, 2016–2018, 2022, and 2024–2026. It won in the Best CD/Record Store category and received honorable mention in the Best Place to See Free Music category in 2015.

== See also ==
- 2nd Avenue Records
- Jackpot Records
- Record Store Day in Portland, Oregon
