= John's Marketplace =

Chain of bottle shops in the Portland metropolitan area, U.S.

- Exterior of the location in southeast Portland, Oregon, 2026

Restaurant information
- Established: 1999
- Location: Oregon, United States
- Website: johnsmarketplace.com

John's Marketplace is a small chain of bottle shops in the Portland metropolitan area, United States. The business was established in 1999. In Portland, John's Marketplace operates in southeast and southwest Portland; the business has also operated in the suburb of Beaverton. In addition to stocking and serving beer, cider, and wine, the locations serve food. The southeast Portland location has a food cart pod called The Lot at John's Marketplace.

== Description ==
Interior of the southeast Portland location in 2026

John's Marketplace is a small chain of bottle shops. The Multnomah Boulevard location in southwest Portland's Multnomah Village has been described as one of the city's largest beer markets, as well as "a cross between a neighborhood grocery store and a bottle shop". Kelly Clarke of Portland Monthly called the location "one of the city’s largest beer selections hides inside dingy minimart" in 2021. The location serves draught beer and flights, as well as cider, wine, and burgers.

The Powell Boulevard location in southeast Portland's Creston-Kenilworth neighborhood has been described as "airy and spacious". It has a food cart pod called The Lot at John's Marketplace. The location has covered seating and picnic tables, as well as a fish-themed mural. It serves beer and cider on draught.

There has also been a location in the suburb of Beaverton. The now-closed location served sandwiches and smash burgers.

== History ==
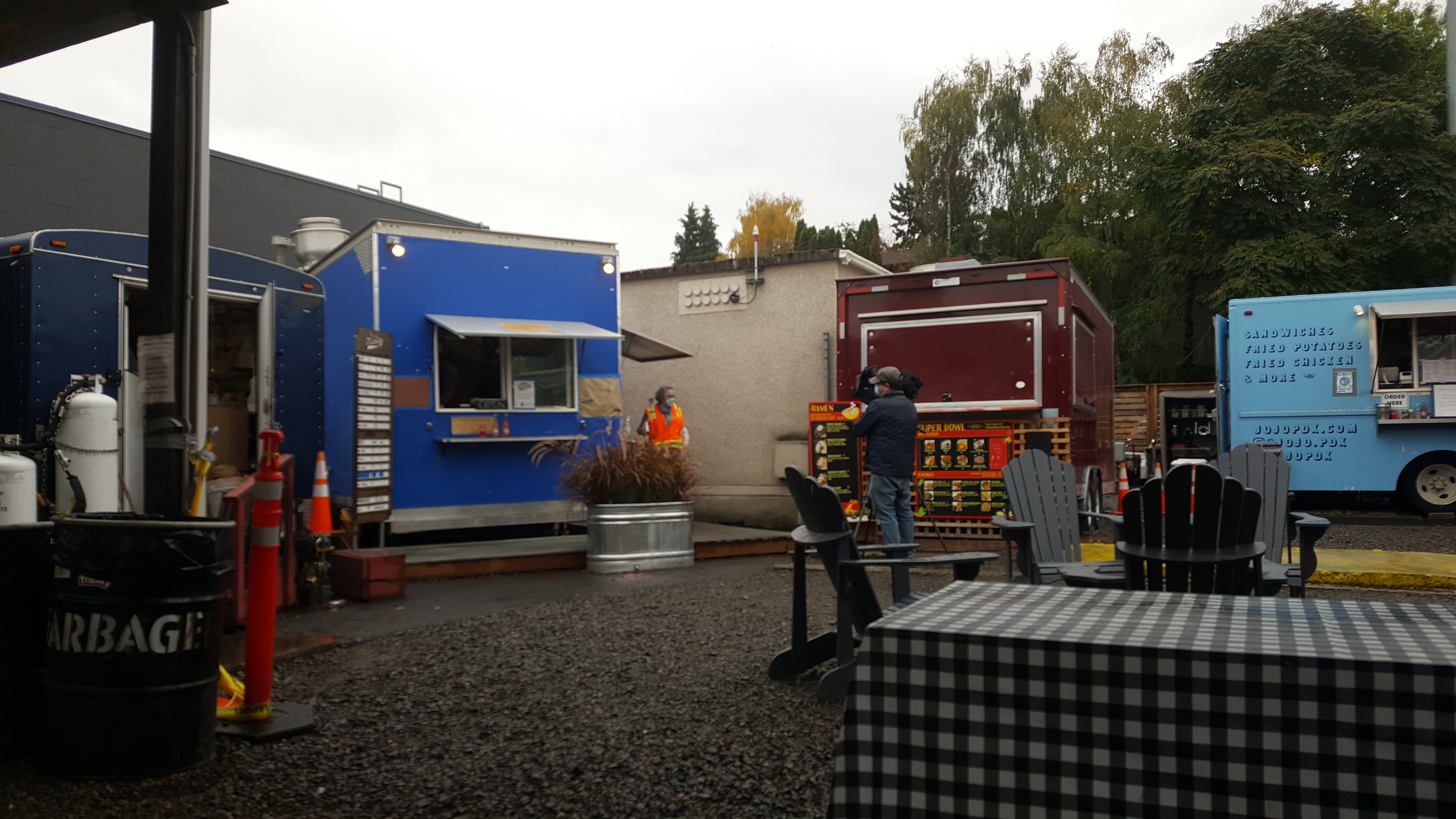
The food cart pod outside John's Marketplace in southeast Portland, 2021

David Percival has been an owner of John's Marketplace, which was established in 1999. Paul and Robert Petros have also been described as co-owners.

The Multnomah location has been described as a "descendent" of John's Meat Market and Renner's Grill. It operates in a former train station and general store. The location has hosted Nano Beer Fest. It hosted a candidates forum for Portland City Council's District 4 in 2024. In December 2024, two masked people drove a truck into the shop in an attempt to steal the ATM. In 2026, the location hosted a non-alcoholic drink festival called 'N/A/ Fest' in conjunction with Dry January.

The Powell location opened in July 2020, in the space that previously housed an Original Taco House. Holy Trinity Barbecue and Jojo are among businesses that have operated at The Lot at John's Marketplace. In 2023, John Marketplace's Powell location hoted Baker's Dozen, described by Willamette Week as "a celebration of beer, doughnuts and coffee".

The Beaverton location opened as the business's third in 2022. In December 2025, the business announced plans to close the location on December 31.

Both Portland locations hosted Nano Beer Fest in 2022. In 2023, John's Marketplace was among local businesses to help raise funds for victims of the Hawaii wildfires. Additionally, all three locations hosted Johnstoberfest. The event featured beers from around the world as well as bratwursts and pretzels.

== Reception ==
Interior of the southeast Portland location, 2026

Guide books by Moon Publications have described John's Marketplace as "one of Portland's most beloved" bottle shops. In 2017, Ned Lannamann of the Portland Mercury said the Multnomah location had "one of the best—if not the best—selections in Portland". In 2019, Lannamann said "wandering through its shelves is like getting lost in a musty, stack-filled bookstore, except with beer". Matthew Singer of Willamette Week said The Lot at John's Marketplace was "not the most attractive pod in town", but also that "there are few trips as essential" as visiting the Jojo food cart. Janey Wong included the business in Eater Portland's 2023 overview of recommended restaurant in Multnomah Village. In 2025, Alex Frane of Portland Monthly called the Multnomah location "one of Portland's most celebrated bottle shops".

== See also ==
- List of restaurant chains in the United States
