= 2nd Avenue Records =

Record shop in Portland, Oregon, U.S.

- Logo

- The shop's exterior at night, 2026
- Founded: 1982; 44 years ago in Portland, Oregon, United States
- Website: 2ndavenuerecords.com

2nd Avenue Records is an independent record shop in Portland, Oregon, United States. Established in 1982, the store specializes in new and used vinyl records, CDs, and music merchandise, with an emphasis on punk, heavy metal, and alternative music. After operating in the Governor Building for more than four decades, the store relocated to a new downtown location in 2025.

== History ==
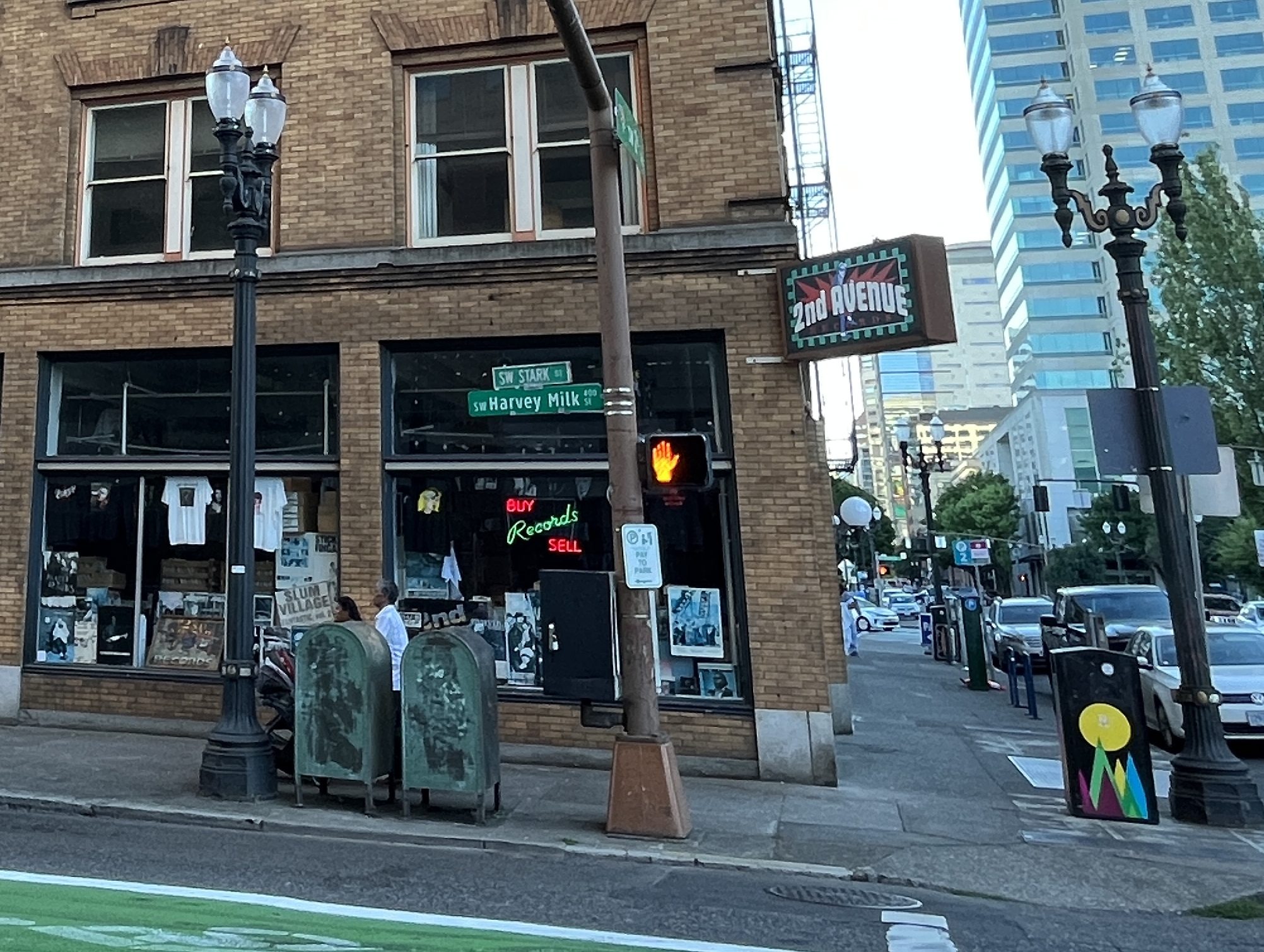
The record shop's exterior at its former location, 2022

2nd Avenue Records operates in downtown Portland. The business operated in the Governor Building for 42 years, from 1982 to 2024. The store opened in a new location in 2025, and demolition of the building that housed the original location of 2nd Avenue was demolished in 2026.

Cathy Hagen and John McNally own the record shop.

The business has been described as "one of Portland's most eclectic music emporiums". In 2016, Walker MacMurdo of Willamette Week wrote, "2nd Avenue's impeccably curated, hyper-organized embarrassment of vinyl riches caters to just about every taste imaginable, but no one in town carries more metal. With hundreds of artist tees hanging from the rafters, even the music haters among us should leave happy." In 2018, a writer for Pitchfork called 2nd Avenue "a mom-and-pop specializing in punk and hardcore". The "voluminous outlet" stocks alternative, electronica, heavy metal, hip hop, indie, post-punk, reggae, and ska records.

2nd Avenue has celebrated Cassette Store Day and Record Store Day. In 2013, the business participated in Record Store Day by promoting the release of Filthkick, an extended play by Poison Idea, on red-colored vinyl. 2nd Avenue has released other exclusive and specials recordings on vinyl for Record Store Day.

== Recognition ==
In The Oregonian's 2014 overview of Portland's best record shops, David Greenwald said 2nd Avenue "is worth visiting just for the band t-shirts, which hang from the ceiling and range from punk and metal to hip-hop and reggae. It feels like a 15-year-old's fantasy closet. But the music's worthy too, with a large selection of used CDs and LPs in the aforementioned genres to go with the usual rock action."

Jenni Moore included 2nd Avenue in Portland Monthly's 2025 overview of the city's best record stores.

== See also ==
- Jackpot Records
- Music Millennium
- Record Store Day in Portland, Oregon
