= SRC (band) =

American psychedelic rock band

The SRC (short for the Scot Richard Case) was a Detroit-based psychedelic rock band from the late 1960s. From 1966 to 1972, they were a staple at many Detroit rock venues, such as the Grande Ballroom.

== Early years ==
In the late 1960s, the psychedelic rock group called SRC (Scot Richard Case) was founded in Detroit, Michigan. The group was well-known for fusing elements of jazz, blues, and rock. Throughout the years they were active, they put out a number of albums, such as Traveler's Tale (1970), Milestones (1969), and SRC (1968). SRC did not attain widespread popularity on a national level, but they did garner a small fan base, especially in the Detroit region. When SRC was created in 1967, its members included drummer E.G. Clawson, guitarist Gary Quackenbush, organist Glenn Quackenbush, guitarist Steve Lyman, and vocalist Scott Richardson. The band formed amid a thriving musical era in Detroit that also gave rise to groups like MC5 and The Stooges. Fans of progressive and psychedelic rock continued to like SRC's music even after the band broke up in the early 1970s. Their records have developed a cult following over time, and they are acknowledged with their peers as pioneers of the Detroit rock movement.

== Scott Richardson years ==
Upon the addition of Richardson, the original line-up included Scott Richardson (vocals), Steve Lyman (rhythm guitar and vocals), Gary Quackenbush (lead guitar), Glenn Quackenbush (organ), Robin Dale (bass and vocals), and E.G. Clawson (stage name for Scott Williamson on drums). Richardson was influenced by the Pretty Things and based the SRC stage show on this. The band recorded its first single, "Who's That Girl"/"I'm So Glad", the latter being a cover of the Cream version of a Skip James song, and released it to moderate reviews. However, fan reaction was good enough for the band's members to choose to drop out of Eastern Michigan University to work on their music—a risk at the time as draft-eligible men were potentially subject to mandatory military duty in the Vietnam War. Robin Dale (stage name) was drafted into the Marine Corps in October 1969.

Soon, the band's sound became more psychedelic, influenced by the likes of Procol Harum, for whom the band would later open. Their self-titled debut album was released by Capitol Records, and the single "Black Sheep"/"Morning Mood" from this album drew fan and media praise. "Black Sheep", considered a psychedelic masterpiece, was released only in mono for the single as an abridged version. The album version featured a longer midsection with additional verses.

"Marionette", "Onesimpletask", and "Refugee" offer additional examples of the expanded guitar and keyboard style developed by the Quackenbush brothers, Gary (guitar) and Glenn (Hammond organ), along with their musically adventurous bandmates.

With growing popularity, the band split from Holland and began to open for several national and international artists in and around Detroit, such as Jimi Hendrix, Traffic, The Who, The Rolling Stones, Janis Joplin, and The Mamas & the Papas, among others. Soon after the success of their first record, the band began to work on a second album. Milestones was released in March 1969, and from this album, they released the single "Up All Night" / "Turn Into Love" (Capitol) in 1969.

Robin Dale was replaced by Al Wilmot, and Steve Lyman would exit the band before Milestones was completed or released. Milestones was perhaps the band's best attempt at commercial and mainstream success, and it and charted in the Billboard 200, but it never reached any position to help SRC break out of the Detroit or Ann Arbor area on to more national success.

Before the start of Traveler's Tale Gary Quackenbush was, in his own words, in a "severe" motorcycle accident that had him hospitalized.

== Final years ==
With a new line-up featuring a single guitarist, Ray Goodman, in place of both Gary Quackenbush and Steve Lyman, SRC recorded and released Traveler's Tale, its third and final LP, showcasing a stylistic shift away from psychedelic rock and toward prog rock.

In the time leading up to the break-up, there were attempts to record without several key members of the band; the results of these sessions remained unreleased for several years. With the group's popularity dwindling, Goodman was released. Soon, the band added Richard Haddad (also known as "Shemp") on bass; he was soon replaced by Byron Coons.

In desperation the band changed its name to Blue Scepter, and released a cover version of the Pretty Things' "Out in the Night". After it failed to generate any interest, the band broke up.

== After the breakup ==
In the years following the breakup of the SRC each member went on to his own personal success. Richardson relocated to Los Angeles and became involved in films. He served as a writer on Hearts of Fire, which starred Bob Dylan, and worked on sets for two of The Lord of the Rings films. He died of natural causes at his home in Dixon, New Mexico on December 7, 2025. Gary Quackenbush went on to start SRC Records and continued to session around the country. While all the members had a wonderful experience while involved in SRC and marginal success elsewhere, in other bands (such as Richardson who later worked with Ray Manzarek of the Doors), none of them were ever involved in a group more noted than this. "Shemp" Haddad was killed in a road accident in California and E.G. Clawson resides in Porterville, California, and is still playing the drums. Haddad's death led to SRC releasing Lost Masters, half of which includes the demos featuring Haddad's work. Gary Quackenbush died in 2015.

In 2010, SRC was voted into the Michigan Rock and Roll Legends Hall of Fame.

== Discography ==
=== Singles ===
- "I'm So Glad"/ "Who Is That Girl" (as The Scot Richard Case, 1967, A-Square)
- "Get the Picture" (as The Old Exciting Scot Richard Case)/ "I Need You" (by The Early Rationals) (1967, A-Square)
- "Black Sheep" / "Morning Mood" (1968, Capitol Records)
- "Up All Night" / "Turn Into Love" (1969, Capitol Records)
- "Never Before Now" / "My Fortune's Coming True" (1970, Capitol Records)
- "Born to Love" / "Badaz Shuffle" (1971, Big Casino Records)
- "Out in the Night" / "Gypsy Eyes" (as Blue Scepter, 1972, Rare Earth Records)

=== Albums ===
- SRC (1968, Capitol Records)
- Milestones (1969, Capitol Records)
- Traveler's Tale (1970, Capitol Records)
- Lost Masters (includes 1970 recordings for a fourth album, 1993, One Way Records)

=== Re-releases ===
- Milestones (1991, One Way Records)
- Traveler's Tale (1993, One Way Records)
- SRC (1993, One Way Records)
- "Black Sheep" (2000, RPM)
- As Blue Scepter
- Capitol Records released a two-CD set, SRC, that includes the band's first three albums, SRC, Milestones, and Traveler's Tale, as well as a bonus track, "My Fortune's Coming True", in 2012.

== Nicknames ==
SRC was known on the street in Milwaukee, Wisconsin, as "Striped Red Candy".

== Bibliography ==
- Grit, Noise, and Revolution: The Birth of Detroit Rock 'n' Roll, David Carson (University of Michigan Press, 2006) ISBN 978-0472031900
