= Original Taco House =

Defunct chain of Mexican restaurants based in Portland, Oregon, U.S.

Restaurant information
- Food type: Mexican
- Location: Portland, Oregon, United States

The Original Taco House was a chain of Mexican restaurants based in Portland, Oregon. Established by the Waddle family in 1960, the business peaked at five locations. The last remaining two locations closed on December 31, 2017.

== See also ==
- Hispanics and Latinos in Portland, Oregon
- List of Mexican restaurants
