= SRC (album) =

Studio album by SRC
- Released: November 1968
- Recorded: Tera Shirma Sound Studios; Detroit, Michigan
- Genre: Psychedelic rock, acid rock
- Length: 35:51 (original release); 42:45 (1993 release)
- Label: Capitol (original release); One Way Records (1993 release)
- Producer: John Rhys

SRC chronology
| SRC (1968) | Milestones (1969) |

Professional ratings
Review scores
| Source | Rating |
|---|---|
| Allmusic | Link |

SRC is the eponymous debut studio album by SRC, released in November 1968 on Capitol Records. This would be the only album that Robin Dale would play on as he left shortly after this album was released.

== Track listing ==
All songs by SRC.

1. "Black Sheep" – 4:42
2. "Daystar" – 4:27
3. "Exile" – 4:21
4. "Marionette" – 4:00
5. "Onesimpletask" – 5:34
6. "Paragon Council" – 3:58
7. "Refugeve" – 3:37
8. "Interval" – 5:12

=== Bonus tracks ===
The 1993 One Way Records CD added bonus tracks:

9. "Morning Mood" (Edvard Grieg, arranged by SRC) – 3:05
10. "Black Sheep" (single '45' version) – 3:49

== Personnel ==
- Scott Richardson – lead vocals
- Gary Quackenbush – lead guitar
- Steve Lyman - rhythm guitar, backing vocals
- Glenn Quackenbush – Hammond organ
- Robin Dale – bass, backing vocals
- E.G. Clawson (Scott Williamson)– drums
