= Battle command =

Military discipline

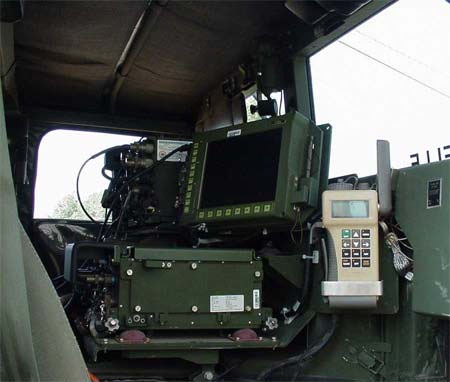
BC FBCB2 component in a Humvee

Battle command (BC) is the discipline of visualizing, describing, directing, and leading forces in operations against a hostile, thinking, and adaptive enemy. Battle command applies leadership to translate decision into actions, by synchronizing forces and warfighting functions in time, space, and purpose, to accomplish missions. Battle command refers both to processes triggered by commanders and executed by soldiers and to the system of systems (SoS) that directly enables those processes.

== Alternate definition ==
FM 100.5

BC is defined as the art of battle decision-making, leading, and motivating soldiers and their organizations into action to accomplish missions. BC includes visualizing the current state and future state, formulating concepts of operations to get from one to the other, and doing so at least cost. Assigning missions, prioritizing and allocating resources, selecting the critical time and place to act, and knowing how and when to make adjustments during the fight are also included.

FM 7-30

BC is the art and science of battlefield decision making and leading soldiers and units to successfully accomplish the mission. The BC basic elements are decision making, leading, and controlling. The BC System of Systems at brigade level enables commanders to lead, prioritize, and allocate assets required to employ and sustain combat power. The brigade commander must see further, process information faster and strike more precisely and quicker. If information is the medium of the BC process, the BC system must provide the commander with timely and accurate information on which to base the commander's decision.

== Synonyms ==
BC is also known by the following terms:

- Command, control, communications, computers, intelligence, surveillance, and reconnaissance (C4ISR)

== Battle management ==
Battle management (BM) is the management of activities within the operational environment based on the commands, direction, and guidance given by appropriate authority. BM is considered to be a subset of BC. (Note: In some contexts (e.g. BMC3 and C2BM), BM appears to be distinct from command and control. In other contexts (e.g. Battle management command), BM appears to be a subset of command and control.)

== Processes ==
Business processes associated with command and control of military forces are detailed in various publications of the United States Department of Defense.

== System of systems ==
Modern BC software and hardware exhibit all of the traits and qualities of an SoS. A BC SoS can be decomposed into systems such as maneuvers, logistics, fires and effects, air support, intelligence, surveillance, reconnaissance (alternatively recognizance) (these three sometimes grouped as ISR, or by adding target acquisition, ISTAR), terrain, and weather. Among the many inputs of these systems is a plethora of sensors which undergo sensor fusion and are compiled into a common operational picture/local operational picture that enable commanders to achieve situational awareness (SA)/situational understanding (SU). SA/SU is paramount for commanders to command and control modern military forces.

== Military acquisition in the United States ==
The Department of the Army organization primarily responsible for the acquisition of the BC SoS is the PM BC, a subordinate organization within the PEO C3T.

== Types ==
=== Battle command on the move (BCOTM) ===
One of the problems with BC SoS is that a commander has little communication while in the battlefield. Command and control planning occurs at a command post (CP) or tactical operations center (TOC). Once a battle begins, a commander leaves the CP/TOC and moves forward to stay engaged. A commander has limited communication possibilities while in the battlefield, making it difficult to follow and control all events as they happen. Battle command on the move (BCOTM) is a capability that provides commanders all of the information resident in their CP/TOC and the required communications necessary to command and control on the move, or at a short halt, from any vantage point on the battlefield.

=== Airborne battle command ===
Example airborne systems that contribute to BC:

- E-8 Joint STARS
- E-3 Sentry

== See also ==
- 505th Command and Control Wing
- Battle management language
- C4ISTAR
- Command and control (military)
- Command and Control Research Program
- Command and control warfare
- Command center
- Command ship
- Common operational picture
- Future Combat Systems manned ground vehicles
- Global Command and Control System
- Global Information Grid
- Joint Force Air Component Headquarters
- Joint Interoperability of Tactical Command and Control Systems
- Local operational picture
- NATO Communications and Information Systems Agency
- NATO Consultation, Command and Control Agency
- NORAD
- Program Executive Office Command Control and Communications Tactical
- Project Manager Battle Command
- Staff (military)
- Worldwide Military Command and Control System
- Mobile Modular Command and Control (M2C2) program
