= VirtuSphere =

Spherical virtual reality device

VirtuSphere is a spherical virtual reality device. It consists of a 10-foot hollow sphere, which is placed on a special platform that allows the sphere to rotate freely in any direction according to the user’s steps. It works with computer based simulations and virtual worlds, and rotates as the user walks, allowing for an unlimited plane upon which the user can walk. A wireless head-mounted display with gyroscopes is used to both track the user's head movement as well as display the environment of the virtual world. VirtuSphere can serve many purposes, including exercise, video gaming, military training, and virtual museum tours.

The VirtuSphere is a creation of Ray and Nurulla Latypov, whose company, VirtuSphere Inc, is based in Binghamton, New York.

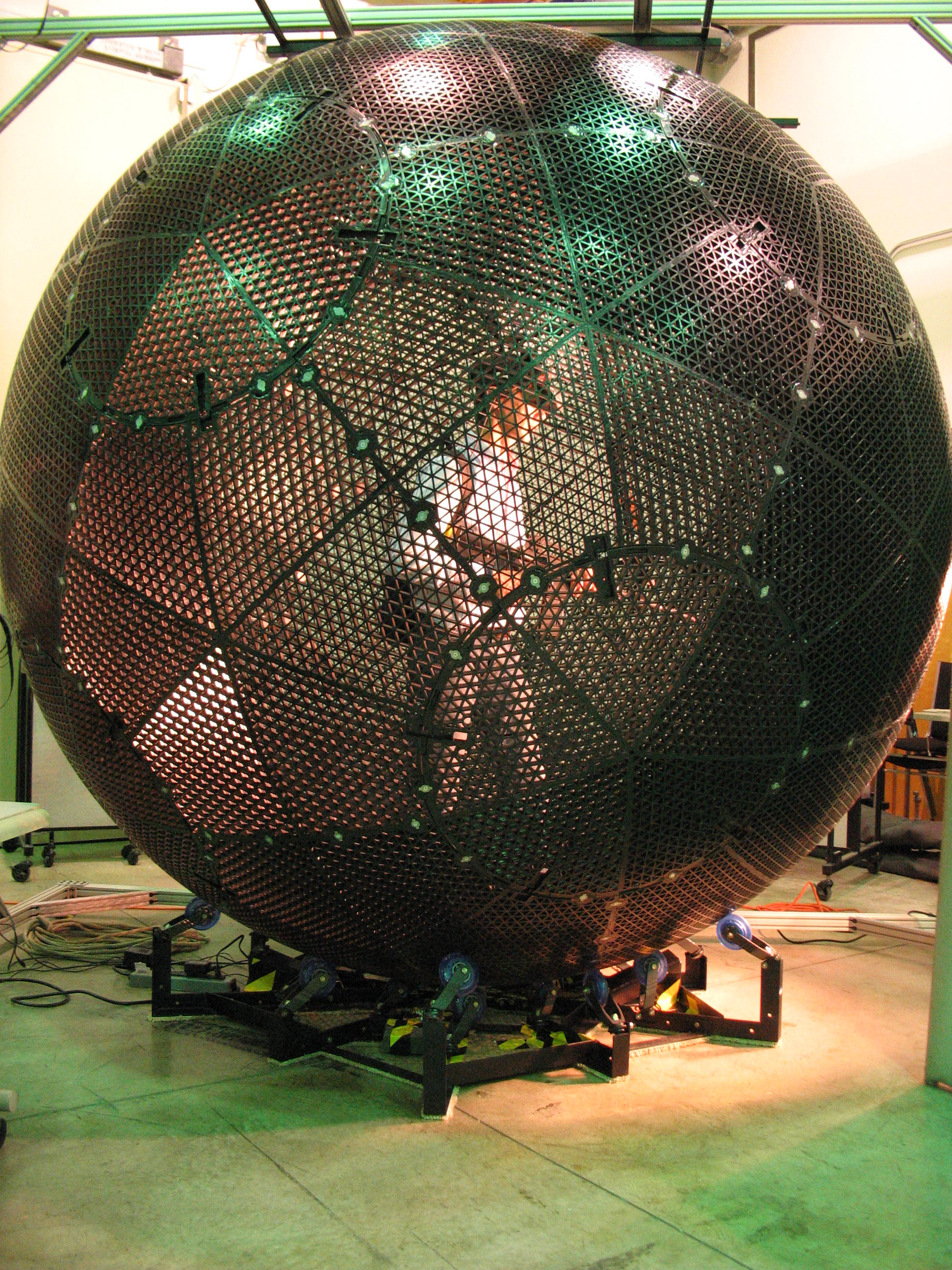
Using the VirtuSphere simulator

== Applications ==
Markets and applications for Virtusphere include:

- Military, law enforcement, and other dangerous occupations that require a safe training environment
- Gaming and entertainment
- Health and fitness
- Museums and other educational installations
- Virtual tours of architectural and construction projects

Lockheed Martin has used the VirtuSphere as an input device in a manned simulator at the Mounted Warfare TestBed (MWTB) at Fort Knox, KY. This simulator incorporates the sphere into a single-soldier simulator that is compatible with the Distributed Interactive Simulation and High level architecture protocols. The simulator is composed of the sphere, a pair of infrared mice to track the sphere’s movements, Intersense trackers on the user’s head and weapon, an image generator on a laptop, display goggles for the user, and a simulator host computer, all on a wireless network. Using this simulator, the user can interact with other simulated entities, whether provided by separate manned simulators like the Advanced Concepts Research Tool (ACRT), or by computer-generated forces systems like OneSAF. The simulator is used at the MWTB for experiments that examine future weapon systems and tactics and for evaluating soldiers.

== See also ==
- Virtual reality
- Omnidirectional treadmill
