= Battle Force Tactical Training =

Tactical combat system trainer

Battle Force Tactical Training or BFTT (pronounced "bee-fit") (Navy designation AN/USQ-T46) is a highly flexible, interactive single ship, group, or force level tactical combat system trainer in the US military. The purpose of BFTT is to "provide training to enhance naval combat readiness." BFTT provides a critical overarching training capability for developing and maintaining proficiencies required to fight a complex modern shipboard combat system in today's warfighting environment. BFTT wraps around the ships combat system to provide a comprehensive and coordinated training environment.

BFTT simulates combat scenarios for the training of the operators of most current shipboard combat systems including Aegis and the newly introduced SSDS. BFTT is subdivided into different components, each with its own specific function that contribute to the overall operation of the system.

The BFTT Operator Processing Console (BOPC) provides a human-machine interface to the rest of BFTT. The BOPC is used to create scenarios which vary in location, environmentals (e.g. sea state, weather), contacts, functions and operations by using a monitor, keyboard and trackball.

BFTT uses the current Department of Defense standard Distributed Interactive Simulation (DIS) interface, and is evolving to the newer High Level Architecture (simulation) (HLA). The system connects to other ships, Joint Forces, and Coalition Forces for large scale force level training events via the Navy Continuous Training Environment (NCTE).

Formalized in April 1992, the then CNO Admiral Frank Kelso launched a new era in the US Navy's combat systems training by approving the development of BFTT. As an outgrowth of BFTT the US Navy developed the BFTT Electronic Warfare Trainer (BEWT) and the Trainer Simulator Stimulator System (TSSS). Over 100 US Navy warships have the BFTT system installed. The follow-on to BFTT, Total Ship Training System (TSTS), has been cancelled and a partial, incremental, improvement program labelled "BFTT mod" has been initiated.
