= Spearhead (video game) =

1998 video game

- Developers: Zombie Studios, MAK Technologies, Inc.
- Publishers: NA: Interactive Magic; EU: Midas Interactive Entertainment
- Platform: Microsoft Windows
- Release: NA: August 24, 1998; EU: 1998
- Genres: Tank simulation, action
- Modes: Single-player, multiplayer

Spearhead is a tank simulation / action video game developed by Zombie Studios and MAK Technologies, Inc., and published by Interactive Magic and Midas Interactive Entertainment for Microsoft Windows in 1998.

== Development ==
Spearhead was jointly developed by Zombie Studios and MAK Technologies, Inc. The networking protocols used in the game were originally developed by MAK for the United States Air Force. The game was showcased at E3 1997. The original publisher, BMG Interactive, shut down a few months later, and I-Magic acquired the publication rights.

== Reception ==
Reception

Aggregate score
| Aggregator | Score |
|---|---|
| GameRankings | 62% |

Review scores
| Publication | Score |
|---|---|
| AllGame | 3/5 |
| CNET Gamecenter | 4/10 |
| Computer Games Strategy Plus | 3.5/5 |
| Computer Gaming World | 2/5 |
| GamePro | 3.5/5 |
| GameRevolution | D+ |
| GameSpot | 7.4/10 |
| IGN | 7/10 |
| PC Accelerator | 7/10 |
| PC Zone | 55% |

Spearhead received mixed reviews according to the review aggregation website GameRankings.

The game was described as a mix between tank simulation and an action game. GameSpot said, "The game offers a handful of features and elements that seem ideal for hard-core sim fans, but the mission designs and the general feel of gameplay seem more appropriate for an action game than a serious sim." IGN said, "the emphasis here is definitely more on fun than it is on realism." PC Accelerator called it an "action/strategy/tank sim hybrid".
