= RPR FOM =

The Real-time Platform Reference Federation Object Model (RPR FOM) enables linking computer simulations of discrete physical entities into complex virtual worlds. It is a High Level Architecture (HLA) federation object model developed for distributed simulation applications of defense and security. RPR FOM is listed in the NATO Modelling and Simulation Standards Profile AMSP-01.

The RPR FOM provides backwards compatibility with simulations using the Distributed Interactive Simulation (DIS) standard. It is standardized by Simulation Interoperability Standards Organization (SISO) as SISO-STD-001-2025.

The standard consists of two main parts and two annexes:

- SISO-STD-001-2025 Standard for Guidance, Rationale, and Interoperability Modalities for the Real-time Platform Reference Federation Object Model (“GRIM”), which provides guidance for use of the RPR FOM.
- SISO-STD-001.1-2025 Real-time Platform Reference Federation Object Model, which provides the object model in XML format for use in HLA Federations.
- SISO-STD-001.1-2025 Annex A Files Normative.zip
- SISO-STD-001.1-2025 Annex B Files Informative.zip

== History and versions ==
When the High Level Architecture was introduced by the US Department of Defense in 1996 the RPR FOM effort was initiated to facilitate the migration from DIS to HLA.

=== RPR FOM version 1.0 ===
This first RPR FOM version was released in 1998. It supports the capabilities of DIS version IEEE 1278.1-1995 (DIS 5). The standard provides a FOM supporting HLA version 1.3.

=== RPR FOM version 2.0 ===
This updated version was released in 2015 as SISO-STD-001. RPR FOM 2.0 supports the capabilities of DIS version IEEE 1278.1a-1998 (DIS 6). The development of RPR FOM 2.0 started in 2000, but came to a halt in 2007, resulting in a widely used draft version 17. The work was restarted in 2012 and finalized with a published standard in 2015. The standard provides FOMs supporting the following HLA versions: 1.3, IEEE 1516-2000 and IEEE 1516-2010 (“HLA Evolved”) in both modular and monolithic formats.

=== RPR FOM version 3.0 ===
RPR FOM version 3.0 was approved in November 2025. This version adds support for expanded IFF (Identification Friend or Foe) with Mode 5 and Mode S (with interactive mode), richer appearance and capabilities definitions for platforms, a new module for Information Operations, directed-energy weapons, support for HLA Time Management, and improved mechanisms for initializion. It supports the capabilities of DIS version IEEE 1278.1-2012 (DIS 7).

== Object model ==
The RPR FOM defines the information exchanged at runtime in a number of FOM modules. As an example, the object classes of the Physical Module are illustrated in the figure below.

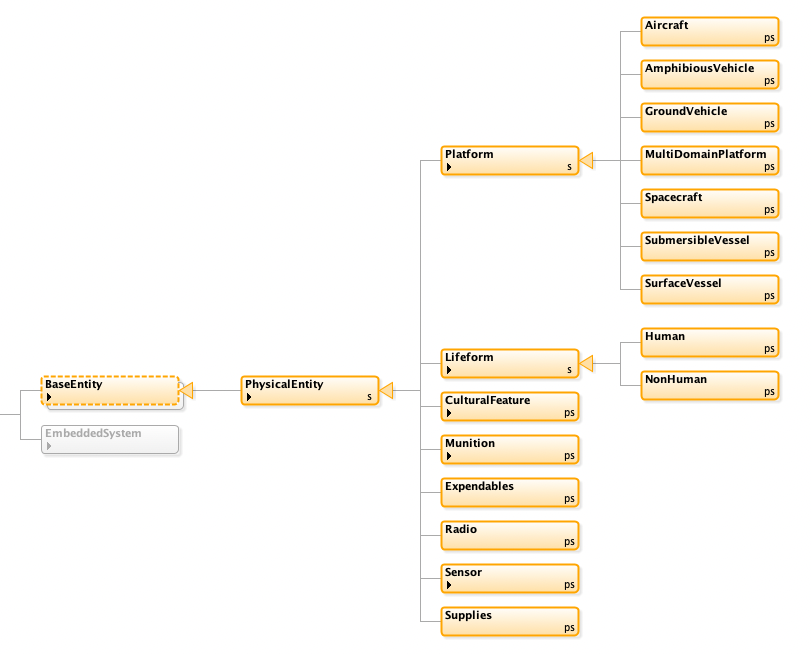
Object classes of the Physical module of the RPR FOM 2.0

The modules are:

1. Physical Module with key object classes Aircraft, Amphibious vehicle, Ground vehicle, Multi-domain platform, Spacecraft, Submersible vessel, Surface vessel, Human, Non-human, Munition, Expendables, Radio, Sensor and Supplies.
2. Aggregate Module with the key object class Aggregate entity.
3. Warfare Module with key interaction classes Weapon fire and Munition detonation.
4. Communication Module with the key object classes Radio transmitter and Radio receiver and several interaction classes for Radio signals.
5. Synthetic Environment Module with the key object classes Gridded data and several Environment objects (Areal object, Linear object and Point object) and a number of interaction classes with transactions for Environment objects.
6. Minefield Module with the key object class Minefield and a number of interaction classes supporting transactions for Minefields.
7. Logistics Module with a number of interaction classes for Repair, Resupply and Service.
8. Underwater Acoustics Module with key object classes Active sonar beam and several types of Underwater acoustics emissions.
9. Distributed Emission Regeneration Module with key object classes Designator, Emitter system, Identification friend or foe (IFF), Radar beam and Jammer beam.
10. Simulation Management Module with key interaction classes Start/Resume, Stop/Freeze, Set data and similar management services.

Additional supporting modules include Foundation Module with a few basic data types, Enumerations Module with enumerations like types of platforms and equipment, Base Module with commonly used data types and generic object classes and Switches Module with runtime switches for the RTI.

== Relationship to other standards ==
The RPR FOM is related to a number of other standards.

- High Level Architecture: The RPR FOM follows the HLA Object Model Template (OMT) standard.
- Distributed Interactive Simulation: The RPR FOM inherits its information exchange model from the DIS standard.
- SISO Enumerations. The RPR FOM includes a module with the SISO standard enumerations (SISO-REF-010). This module can be replaced when new versions of the enumerations are released.
- Link 16: A Base Object Model (BOM), similar to a FOM module, that supports the exchange of Link 16 information is available as SISO-STD-002-2006. This module is compatible with the RPR FOM.
- NATO Education and Training Network FOM (NETN FOM): This standard provides a number of FOM modules that extends the RPR FOM with support for multi-resolution modeling, initialization (based on Military Scenario Definition Language (MSDL), transfer of modeling responsibilities, logistics, CBRN defense, and simulation control. The NETN FOM is included in the NATO Allied Modelling and Simulation Publication (AMSP-04) covered by NATO STANREC 4800.
- Military Scenario Definition Language (MSDL): This standard is supported through NETN FOM above
- Coalition Battle management language (C-BML): This standard is supported through NETN FOM above
