= MAK Technologies, Inc. =

MAK Technologies
- Type: Wholly owned subsidiary
- Industry: Modeling & Simulation
- Headquarters: Cambridge, Massachusetts, United States
- Parent: ST Engineering North America
- Website: www.mak.com

MAK Technologies, formerly doing business as VT MAK, Inc. is a software company based in Cambridge, Massachusetts that provides commercial off-the-shelf (COTS) modeling and simulation software. The company develops and sells software for distributed simulations that system integrators, governments, and research institutions use to build and populate 3D simulated environments. Users include medical, aerospace, defense, and transportation industries. In addition to offering COTS software, MAK provides the following services: simulation content creation, software customization, interoperability, research and development, and training.

== History ==
MAK Technologies was founded in 1990. In 2006 the company was acquired by Vision Technologies Systems, Inc. (VT Systems). In 2009 MAK began doing business as (d.b.a.) VT MAK to reflect the branding of the parent company. In 2019 the parent company was renamed ST Engineering North America. In 2020 MAK dropped the d.b.a. VT MAK and returned to doing business as MAK Technologies, a company of ST Engineering North America. MAK has contributed significantly to SISO interoperability standards including the High-Level Architecture (HLA) RPRFOM and the Web Live Virtual Constructive (WebLVC) simulation initiative.

In 2013, MAK acquired DI-Guy. Formerly a business segment of Boston Dynamics, DI-Guy develops software tools for real-time human visualization, simulation and artificial intelligence.

== Technology ==
MAK Technologies develops COTS software for distributed simulation. MAK works with customers to build and populate 3D simulated environments where modeling and simulation is needed to train, plan, analyze, experiment, prototype, and demonstrate. MAK uses open standards as a base for its product line, which is natively compliant with both High Level Architecture (HLA) and Distributed Interactive Simulation (DIS) IEEE standards. The company has also drafted and submitted the WebLVC protocol for review to the Simulation Interoperability Standards Organization (SISO), in an effort to bring live, virtual, and constructive simulation to web browsers.

MAK Technologies holds several United States software patents including: A computer-implemented method for use in a distributed interactive simulation (DIS) type network protocol for simulating sustained contact of first and second computer-implemented objects on each other in a virtual environment, as well as two patents for high speed eye tracking device and method.

== Customers ==
MAK Technologies’s software is used by governments, system integrators, and research institutions such as Boeing, Raytheon Integrated Defense Systems, General Dynamics, Lockheed Martin, Northrop Grumman, BAE Systems, Meggitt Training Systems, Rheinmetall Canada, Thales Group, RUAG, University of Iowa, Cincinnati Children's Hospital, SAIC, the United States Air Force, the Pakistan Air Force, the Naval Air Warfare Center, The Council for Scientific and Industrial Research in South Africa, George Mason University, NASA Langley, Czech Air Defense Technical Institute, the Federal Aviation Administration, DRDC Toronto, Bell Helicopter, ITT, Embraer, Selex Galileo, and EADS.

== Products ==
MAK's product line includes interoperability tools to help link distributed simulations together; Simulation tools to model vehicles, people and interactions within virtual worlds; Visualization tools which visualize the simulations playing out in those virtual worlds. With the inclusion of DI-Guy in 2013, MAK now has a full line of Human Character Simulation tools.

Product Categories

- Link — Interoperability tools for interconnecting simulators and simulation components within a Distributed Interactive Simulation (DIS) compliant with the High-level architecture.
- Simulate — First person virtual simulation and computer generated forces simulation. Scenario generation and simulation solution for generating and running urban, battlefield, and airspace scenarios.
- Visualize — 3D immersive scenes, 2D map displays, and 3D informational displays showing the simulation activity.
- Humans — AI Human characters for real-time visual simulations. Characters move realistically, respond to simple high-level commands, and travel throughout the environment as directed.
- Terrain — a streaming terrain solution that supplies the physical environment to simulation and visualization tools.
- Web / Mobile — WebLVC based interoperability tools that connect distributed simulation federations to web clients using JSON messages.

== Standards ==
Simulation industry standards and formats contributed to, and used by, MAK Technologies include:

- High Level Architecture (HLA)
- Distributed Interactive Simulation (DIS)
- Open Source Geospatial Foundation Web Mapping Service (OSGeo)
- Tile Map Service (TMS)
- Simulation Interoperability Standards Organization (SISO)
