= UK resilience abbreviations =

This reference source has been created to collate UK resilience abbreviations into a single location. UK resilience is the equivalent of the EU civil protection and other countries' emergency management programmes.

| Abbreviation | Meaning | Explanation |
|---|---|---|
| CCA2004 | Civil Contingencies Act 2004 | The underpinning legislation of the UK Resilience programme |
| CCS | Civil Contingencies Secretariat | Created in July 2001, this is the department of the British Cabinet Office responsible for emergency planning in the UK |
| CNI | Critical National Infrastructure | Elements of critical infrastructure which have been identified by Government as being of strategic national importance to essential service delivery |
| COBR | Cabinet Office Briefing Room | UK Government's dedicated crisis management facilities, which are activated in the event of an emergency requiring support and co-ordination at the national strategic level |
| COMAH | Control of Major Accident Hazards | Regulations, current version 2015, that are in place for the emergency planning arrangements in regards to large scale hazardous materials storage and use in the UK |
| COP | Common Operational Picture | A single identical display of relevant (operational) information. |
| DECC | Department of Energy and Climate Change | Lead UK Govt. Dept. for Oil, Power Generation, Coal, Gas and Electricity Industry emergencies |
| DEFRA | Department of Environment, Food and Rural Affairs | Lead UK Govt. Dept. for flooding and environmental protection |
| EA | Environment Agency | Agency within DEFRA with lead responsibility for environmental protection and flooding |
| EPC | Emergency Planning College | UK Govt. Centre of Learning for UK Resilience programme. |
| FRS | Fire & Rescue Service | Common organisational title used for services delivering first response activities relating to fires, HAZMAT and rescues. |
| JESIP | Joint Emergency Services Interoperability Programme | Established in 2012 to address the recommendations and findings from a number of major incident reports. |
| LRF | Local Resilience Forum | Local resilience forums (LRFs) are multi-agency partnerships made up of representatives from local public services, including the emergency services, local authorities, the NHS, the Environment Agency and others. These agencies are known as Category 1 Responders, as defined by the Civil Contingencies Act. |
| LSGE | Local Supply Gas Emergency | Emergency resulting from a threatened or actual loss of supply in the gas distribution network at local level |
| MAPP | Major Accident Prevention Procedures | Document setting accident prevention procedures in place at low level COMAH sites |
| MATTE | Major Accidents to the Environment | DETR COMAH Regs CDOIF Guidelines setting out different severity and durations of incidents impacting on the environment comprising four MATTE levels. |
| NCEC | National Chemical Emergency Centre | NCEC delivers the 24-hour emergency response service for the UK Chemical Industry |
| NSGE | Network Supply Gas Emergency | Emergency resulting from a threatened or actual loss of supply in the UK Gas network |
| SCG | Strategic Command Group | Multi-agency command group at the strategic level within the hierarchical command structure for emergencies. |
| TCG | Tactical Co-ordination Group | A multi-agency group of tactical commanders that meets to determine, co-ordinate and deliver the tactical response to an emergency |
| TRANSEC | Transport Security and Contingencies | Department for Transport's Transport Security and Contingencies Directorate |
