= CCTB =

CCTB may stand for:

- Chicago Convention and Tourism Bureau, an organization which promotes conventions and tourism in Chicago
- Canada Child Tax Benefit, a tax-free payment available to some Canadian families
- Common Consolidated Tax Base, one of several Next_Generation_EU#Additional_sources_of_revenue
- Central Compilation and Translation Bureau, a now defunct party formed to research and translate Marxist works.
- Close Combat Testbed, one of the former names for the historical U.S. Army training program known as Mounted Warfare TestBed
