= Middleware =

Computer software that provides services to software applications

Middleware is a type of computer software program that provides services to software applications beyond those available from the operating system. It can be described as "software glue".

Middleware makes it easier for software developers to implement communication and input/output, so they can focus on the specific purpose of their application. It gained popularity in the 1980s as a solution to the problem of how to link newer applications to older legacy systems, although the term had been in use since 1968.

== In distributed applications ==
Software architecture: Middleware

The term is most commonly used for software that enables communication and management of data in distributed applications. An IETF workshop in 2000 defined middleware as "those services found above the transport (i.e. over TCP/IP) layer set of services but below the application environment" (i.e. below application-level APIs). In this more specific sense middleware can be described as the hyphen ("-") in client-server, or the -to- in peer-to-peer. Middleware includes web servers, application servers, content management systems, and similar tools that support application development and delivery.

ObjectWeb defines middleware as: "The software layer that lies between the operating system and applications on each side of a distributed computing system in a network." Services that can be regarded as middleware include enterprise application integration, data integration, message oriented middleware (MOM), object request brokers (ORBs), and the enterprise service bus (ESB).

Database access services are often characterised as middleware. Some of them are language specific implementations and support heterogeneous features and other related communication features. Examples of database-oriented middleware include ODBC, JDBC, and transaction processing monitors.

Distributed computing system middleware can loosely be divided into two categories—those that provide human-time services (such as web request servicing) and those that perform in machine-time. This latter middleware is somewhat standardized through the Service Availability Forum and is commonly used in complex, embedded systems within the telecom, defence, and aerospace industries.

== Usage of middleware ==
Many categories of middleware have been defined, based on the field in which it is used or the application module it serves. A recent bibliography identified the main categories of middleware as follows:

- Transactional: Processing of multiple synchronous/asynchronous transactions, serving as a cluster of associated requests from distributed systems such as bank transactions or credit card payments.
- Message-oriented: Message queue and message passing architectures that support synchronous/asynchronous communication.
- Procedural: Remote and local architectures to connect, pass, and retrieve software responses of asynchronous systems communications such as a call operation.
- Object-oriented: Similar to procedural middleware, but incorporates object-oriented programming design principles. Analytically, its software component encompasses object references, exceptions, and inheritance of properties via distributed object requests.

== Other examples ==
The term middleware is used in other contexts as well. Middleware is sometimes used in a similar sense to a software driver, an abstraction layer that hides detail about hardware devices or other software from an application.

- The Android operating system uses the Linux kernel at its core, and provides an application framework that developers incorporate into their applications. In addition, Android provides a middleware layer including libraries that provide services such as data storage, screen display, multimedia, and web browsing. Because the middleware libraries are compiled to machine language, services execute quickly. Middleware libraries also implement device-specific functions, so applications and the application framework need not concern themselves with variations between Android devices. Android's middleware layer also contains the ART virtual machine and its core Java application libraries.
- Middleware also refers to the software that separates two or more APIs and provides services such as rate-limiting, authentication, and logging.
- In web application frameworks, middleware refers to reusable components that participate in processing HTTP requests and responses. Components may inspect or modify requests, delegate processing to another component or application handler, modify outgoing responses, or produce a response without further delegation. Common uses include authentication, session handling, logging and response compression. Depending on the framework, middleware is implemented as functions or objects wrapping application handlers, or as stages in a processing chain.
- Game engine software such as Gamebryo and RenderWare are sometimes described as middleware because they provide services to simplify game development.
- In simulation technology, middleware is generally used in the context of the high level architecture (HLA) that applies to many distributed simulations. It is a layer of software that lies between the application code and the run-time infrastructure. Middleware generally consists of a library of functions, and enables a number of applications—simulations or federates in HLA terminology—to page these functions from the common library rather than recreate them for each application.
- In x86 computers, UEFI/BIOS is a middleware between the operating system and the hardware.
- Wireless networking developers can use middleware to meet the challenges associated with a wireless sensor network (WSN). Implementing a middleware application allows WSN developers to integrate operating systems and hardware with the wide variety of currently available applications.
- The QNX operating system offers middleware for providing multimedia services for use in automobiles, aircraft, and other environments.
- Radio-frequency identification (RFID) software toolkits provide middleware to filter noisy and redundant raw data.

== See also ==
- Language-agnostic
- Third-party software component
