= DSEEP =

Distributed Simulation Engineering and Execution Process

Distributed Simulation Engineering and Execution Process (DSEEP) is a standardized process for building federations of computer simulations. DSEEP is maintained by SISO and the standard is published as IEEE Std 1730-2022. DSEEP is a recommended systems engineering process in the NATO Modelling and Simulation Standards Profile AMSP-01, which also uses DSEEP as a framework for describing when other standards are to be used throughout a project process.

DSEEP can be used together with several interoperability standards, such as HLA, DIS and TENA. DSEEP was previously called FEDEP (Federation Development and Execution Process).

== DSEEP steps ==
DSEEP specifies the core process steps. The standard is complemented by overlays for additional aspects.

DSEEP consists of seven steps that can be carried out in a linear fashion, or iterated using a spiral approach. The steps are:

1. Define Simulation Environment Objectives
2. Perform Conceptual Analysis
3. Design Simulation Environment
4. Develop Simulation Environment
5. Integrate and Test Simulation Environment
6. Execute Simulation
7. Analyse Data and Evaluate Results

== DSEEP terminology ==
DSEEP uses a generic terminology that maps to different standards and frameworks as shown in this table.

Mapping
DSEEP	HLA	DIS	TENA
Simulation environment	Federation	Simulation exercise	Logical range
Member application	Federate	Simulation application	Range resource application
Simulation data exchange model	Federation Object Model (FOM)	(implicit in DIS PDUs)	Logical range object model (LROM)
