= Simulation Interoperability Standards Organization =

The Simulation Interoperability Standards Organization (SISO) is an organization dedicated to the promotion of modeling and simulation interoperability and reuse for the benefit of diverse modeling and simulation communities, including developers, procurers, and users, worldwide.

== History ==
The Simulation Interoperability Standards Organization (SISO) originated with a small conference held April 26 and 27, 1989, called, "Interactive Networked Simulation for Training". The original conference attracted approximately 60 people. The group was concerned that there was activity occurring in networked simulation, but that it was occurring in isolation. The group believed that if there were a means to exchange information between companies and groups that the technology would advance more rapidly.

The group also believed that once the technology begins to stabilize then there would also be a need for standardization. The technology and the consensus of the community would be captured in the standards as networking or simulation technology matured. The pre-history of SISO starts with SIMNET, a DARPA program from 1983 through 1991 that demonstrated the feasibility of networking substantial numbers of (relatively) low-cost simulators on a "virtual battlefield."

Based on the success of this program, the US Army initiated a large-scale program called Combined Arms Tactical Training. In order to ensure that multiple teams of contractors would be able to bid on various components of this program, the Army Program Manager for Training Devices (PM TRADE), soon to be renamed as the Army Simulation Training and Instrumentation Command (STRICOM - now PEO STRI), in conjunction with DARPA and the newly established Defense Modeling and Simulation Office (DMSO now Modeling and Simulation Coordination Office (MSCO)), initiated a series of workshops at which user agencies and interested contractors could work together to develop standards based on the SIMNET protocols.

The "First Conference on Standards for the Interoperability of Defense Simulations" was held on 22–23 August 1989 in Orlando, Florida. DIS Workshops were held semi-annually from 1989 through 1996. The first Simulation Interoperability Workshop (SIW) held under the SISO banner was the 1997 Spring SIW in Orlando. SIWs have continued semi-annually since 1997. In 2001, SISO also began holding annual Euro-SIWs at various locations in Europe. In 2003, the IEEE Computer Society Standards Activities Board (SAB) granted the SISO Standards Activities Committee (SAC) status as a recognized IEEE Sponsor Committee. SISO is also recognized as a Standards Development Organization (SDO) by NATO. In addition, SISO is a Category C Liaison Organization with ISO/IEC JTC 1 for the development of standards for the representation and interchange of data regarding Synthetic Environment Data Representation and Interchange Specification (SEDRIS).

SISO was an original sponsor of SimSummit.

== Contributions ==
SISO originated, maintained, or contributed standards:

- IEEE 1278 Distributed Interactive Simulation (DIS)
- IEEE 1516 High Level Architecture (HLA) for Modeling and Simulation
- IEEE 1730 DSEEP Distributed Simulation Engineering and Execution Process
- ISO/IEC 18023-1, SEDRIS—Part 1: Functional specification
- ISO/IEC 18023-2, SEDRIS—Part 2: Abstract transmittal format
- ISO/IEC 18023-3, SEDRIS—Part 3: Transmittal format binary encoding
- ISO/IEC 18024-4, SEDRIS language bindings—Part 4: C
- ISO/IEC 18025, Environmental Data Coding Specification (EDCS)
- ISO/IEC 18041-4, EDCS language bindings—Part 4: C
- ISO/IEC 18026, Spatial Reference Model (SRM)
- ISO/IEC 18042-4, SRM language bindings—Part 4: C
- SISO-STD-001-2015: Guidance, Rationale, & Interoperability Modalities for the RPR FOM (GRIM 2.0)
- SISO-STD-001.1-2015: Real-time Platform Reference Federation Object Model (RPR FOM 2.0)
- SISO-STD-002-2006: Standard for: Link16 Simulations
- SISO-STD-003-2006; Base Object Model (BOM) Template Specification
- SISO-STD-003.1-2006; Guide for BOM Use and Implementation
- SISO-STD-004-2004: Dynamic Link Compatible HLA API Standard for the HLA Interface Specification
- SISO-STD-004.1-2004: Dynamic Link Compatible HLA API Standard for the HLA Interface Specification
- SISO-STD-005-200X: Link 11 A/B
- SISO-STD-006-200X: Commercial Off-the-Shelf (COTS) Simulation Package Interoperability (CSPI)
- SISO-STD-007-2008: Military Scenario Definition Language (MSDL)
- SISO-STD-008-200X: Coalition-Battle Management Language (C-BML)

== See also ==
- Distributed Interactive Simulation (DIS)
- High-level architecture (simulation) (HLA)
- Interservice/Industry Training, Simulation and Education Conference (I/ITSEC)
- Modeling and simulation (M&S)
- Military Operations Research Society (MORS)
- Operations research
- Sedris (originally "Synthetic Environment Data Representation and Interchange Specification")
