= Run-time infrastructure (simulation) =

Middleware for high level architecture

In simulation, run-time infrastructure (RTI) is a middleware that is required when implementing the High Level Architecture (HLA). RTI is the fundamental component of HLA. It provides a set of software services that are necessary to support federates to coordinate their operations and data exchange during a runtime execution. In other sense, it is the implementation of the HLA interface specification but is not itself part of specification. Modern RTI implementations conform to the IEEE 1516 and/or HLA 1.3 API specifications. These specifications do not include a network protocol for RTI. It is up to the implementors of an RTI to create a specification. Due to this, interoperability between RTI products and often, RTI versions, should not be assumed unless the vendor specifies interoperability with other products or versions.
