= Mounted Warfare TestBed =

U.S. Army military site at Fort Knox, Kentucky

Mounted Warfare TestBed (MWTB) at Fort Knox, Kentucky, was the premier site for distributed simulation experiments in the US Army for over 20 years. It used simulation systems, including fully manned virtual simulators and computer-generated forces, to perform experiments that examined current and future weapon systems, concepts, and tactics.

"In name only, Cyberspace had its origins in science fiction: its historical beginnings and technological innovations are clearly military (from NASA's primitive flight simulators of the 1940s to the ultra-modern SIMNET-D facilities in Fort Knox, Kentucky)..." - James der Derian, Antidiplomacy

== History ==
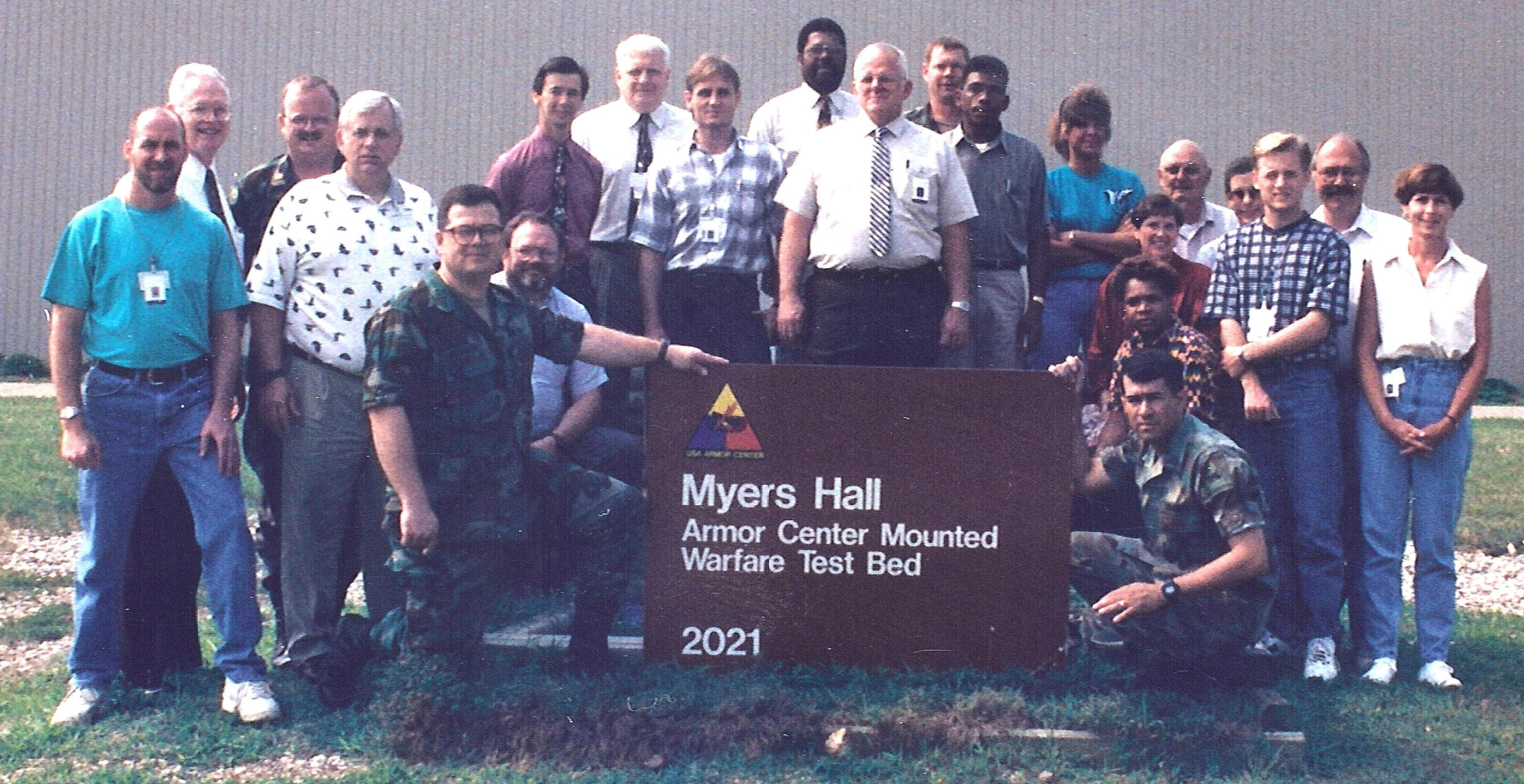
1996 Staff of the Mounted Warfare TestBed

The MWTB started as the initial site of the SIMNET-D program in 1986. SIMNET-D was a spinoff of the SIMNET program, which was the first successful program to use low-cost computers to construct virtual simulators whose resources were distributed rather than centralized. These M1 Abrams and M2 Bradley simulators, along with the Semi-Automated Forces simulation and the Management Command and Control (MCC) system, allowed the creation of a realistic battlefield where participants could actively fight an enemy using current systems in real time.

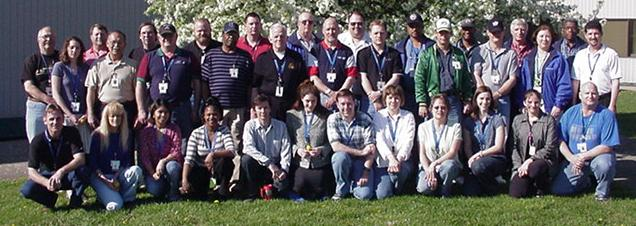
~2006 Staff of the Mounted Warfare TestBed

The first MWTB site manager, Dick Garvey, established a strong focus on measurement of battlefield effects from Human-in-the-Loop (HITL) simulation. This was in marked contrast with the then-prevalent approach of using highly scripted, closed-form simulations, where the outcome was defined by the scenario designer. HITL provided an opportunity to evaluate new systems and concepts whose application was not yet fully understood.

With an enthusiastic embrace of technical innovation and a lean management style, the site carried Garvey's initial philosophy to establish many of the concepts and techniques for experimentation using distributed simulation.

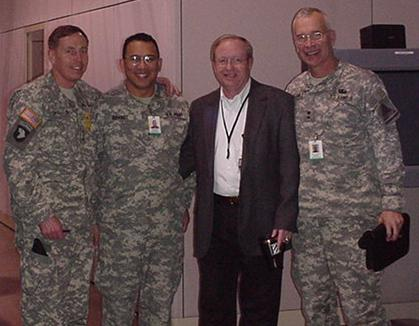
Visit by Gen Petraeus

== Significant Exercises ==
=== 1988: Forward Area Air Defense (FAADS) ===
The first use of SIMNET for Developmental Tests occurred in March and April 1988 at Ft. Knox and Ft. Rucker. These tests were feasibility studies to determine whether SIMNET could be used for Force Development Test and Evaluation (FDT&E) and Initial Operational Test and Evaluation (IOT&E). A total of 164 soldiers and pilots from Ft. Bliss, Ft. Knox, Ft. Rucker, and the Army and Air National Guard participated.

=== 1989-1994: CVCC ===
The most important early user of the MWTB was the Combat Vehicle Command and Control (CVCC) series of experiments by Army Research Institute that examined various aspects of the proposed upgrades to the M1A1 tank, including computerized navigation and digital command-and-control. They were instrumental in developing the training plans for the M1A2. The experiments used a company of SIMNET M1 simulators, augmented by a battalion of BLUFOR from the Semi-Automated Forces system.

=== 1990-1992: Line-of-Sight Anti-Tank (LOSAT) ===
The LOSAT system, which used a hypervelocity kinetic-energy missile and a sophisticated fire control system, was evaluated for human-interface and system performance.

=== 1995: Anti- Armor Advanced Technology Demonstration (A2ATD) ===
The A2ATD program used a series of six experiments, along with extensive improvements to simulation technology, to demonstrate the utility of man-in-the-loop distributed simulation to perform credible experiments to support acquisition decisions. By demonstrating a verified, validated and accredited DIS capability, A2ATD established the foundation for subsequent activities at the MWTB and at all of the other Battle Labs.

=== 1995: Focused Dispatch ===
The Focused Dispatch Experiment was one of the first instances of live-virtual-constructive (LVC) simulation. Conducted at Fort Knox and the Western Kentucky Training Area via satellite linkage, its primary purpose was to examine how digital connections might enhance an armored formation's fire support, intelligence, logistics, and battle command, to determine whether enhancements in lethality, survivability, and tempo would result. Real vehicles from Company B of Task Force 2-33 were fitted with Vehicular Data Communications and Positional Awareness Demonstration devices, which transmitted the vehicles' location every 10 seconds into the simulated environment back at Knox. In the simulators at the MWTB, the soldiers from the remaining two companies saw the real vehicles exactly as they would see simulated vehicles.

=== 1997-2000: Battle Command Reengineering ===
Battle Command Reengineering was a series of experiments that looked at how digital command-and-control systems should be incorporated into brigade-and-below units. It also focused on what attributes these systems should have, their impact on other systems in the Army, and on the use of related future systems, like remote sensors and precision fires. It helped pave the way for the Future Combat Systems program. It fostered numerous innovations, like the development of automated mechanisms for evaluating the performance of the command staff, examination of how situational awareness uncertainty affects decision making, information request, and staff dynamics, development of training programs for digital forces along with redesigned command staff processes for optimally efficient use of digital C2 systems, and aggressive employments of image generation and HLA networking.

=== 2000: BCIS ===
The Battlefield Combat Identification System (BCIS) was evaluated in a series of experiments that looked at user-interface and battlefield performance. The system was effective in reducing fratricide in night battles. However, in day battles, more fratricides occurred than did at night. This phenomenon was believed to be the result of troops using BCIS at night when visibility is poor, but trusted their own vision in the day more than they trust BCIS responses.

=== 2002-2003: C4ISR ===
The C4ISR experiment provided input to the FCS Analysis of Alternatives and the Operational and Objective (O&O) analysis to support the FCS Milestone B decision. The experiment was conducted in a human-in-the-loop, simulation supported, secure environment. The experiment focused on the issues of battle command and how it affected measures of force effectiveness.

=== 2004-2007: Omni-Fusion ===
The Omni-Fusion experiments built on the concepts of Battle Command Re-Engineering and C4ISR to refine designs and concepts for the Future Combat Systems Program. The application of widely distributed simulation to classified experimentation was highly developed during these exercises.

=== 2006: Urban Resolve 2015 ===
The Urban Resolve 2015 was designed to examine Joint Urban Operations (JUO), Military Support for Stabilization, Security, Transition and Reconstruction Operations (SSTRO), and Major Combat Operations (MCO).

=== 2006: RDECOM Experiment FY06 (RUX06) ===
The RUX06 was a true LVC event, combining manned simulators, a force wraparound generated in constructive simulation with actual vehicles fitted with emulators of future C2 technologies on the ranges at Ft. Knox in real-time; this experiment examined workload and stress of crews of future manned vehicles under varied threat conditions.

=== 2008: COIN ===
The Counter Insurgency Experiment was a large, multi-site exercise that included most members of the BLCSE. It simulated downtown Baghdad, Iraq, with US and Iraqi soldiers, Iraqi police, armed and unarmed civilians from several groups, like Shia and Sunni, and armed insurgents. It examined how Future Combat Systems technologies work in a dense, urban environment.

=== 2009: Complex Web Defense ===
The Complex Web Defense Experiment examined the effectiveness of systems and tactics of a force composed of a Combined Arms Bn (CAB), one Stryker Infantry Battalion, Force Design Update (FDU) Reconnaissance Squadron, supported by appropriate joint and army enablers against a predominantly dismounted enemy that was embedded in a semi-urban environment. It was one of the first large distributed exercises using OneSAF with classified performance data.

== Innovations in Simulation Technology ==
=== ACRT ===
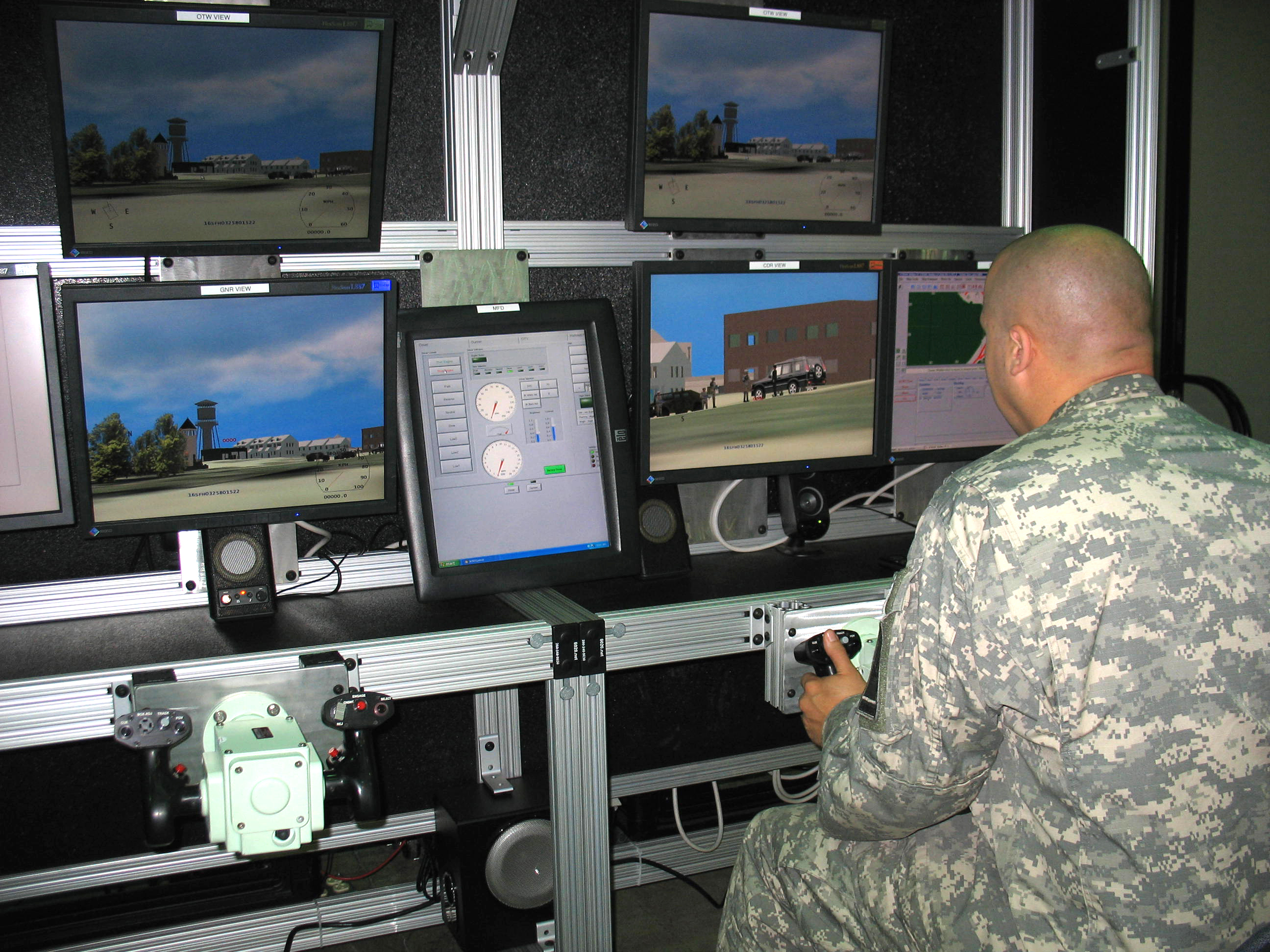
Desktop ACRT

The Advanced Reconfigurable Research Tool was a virtual simulator developed using OneSAF TestBed as a software base. It was very modular to allow rapid changes to vehicle characteristics, and it could model many vehicle types, like the M1 Abrams, M2 Bradley, Stryker, HMMWV, along with various variants from the Future Combat Systems program. It incorporated an innovative mobility model for the OneSAF TestBed (OTB) simulation that used SIMNET and CCTT soil codes in the digital terrain database to provide fine-grained soils with appropriate mobility response for computer-generated entities.

=== SA Server ===
The Situational Awareness (SA) Server was an interface between the simulation and tactical networks. It provided Level 1 Sensor Fusion using a Kalman filter. The tactical network it supported used experimental DIS PDUs for the blue and red Common Operating Picture (COP). It also supported an early version of the NetFires system for semi-automated fire support. Multiple SA Servers could be configured in a multi-cell arrangement to use communications effects as defined by a comms model like ALCES or QualNet.

=== Tech Control ===
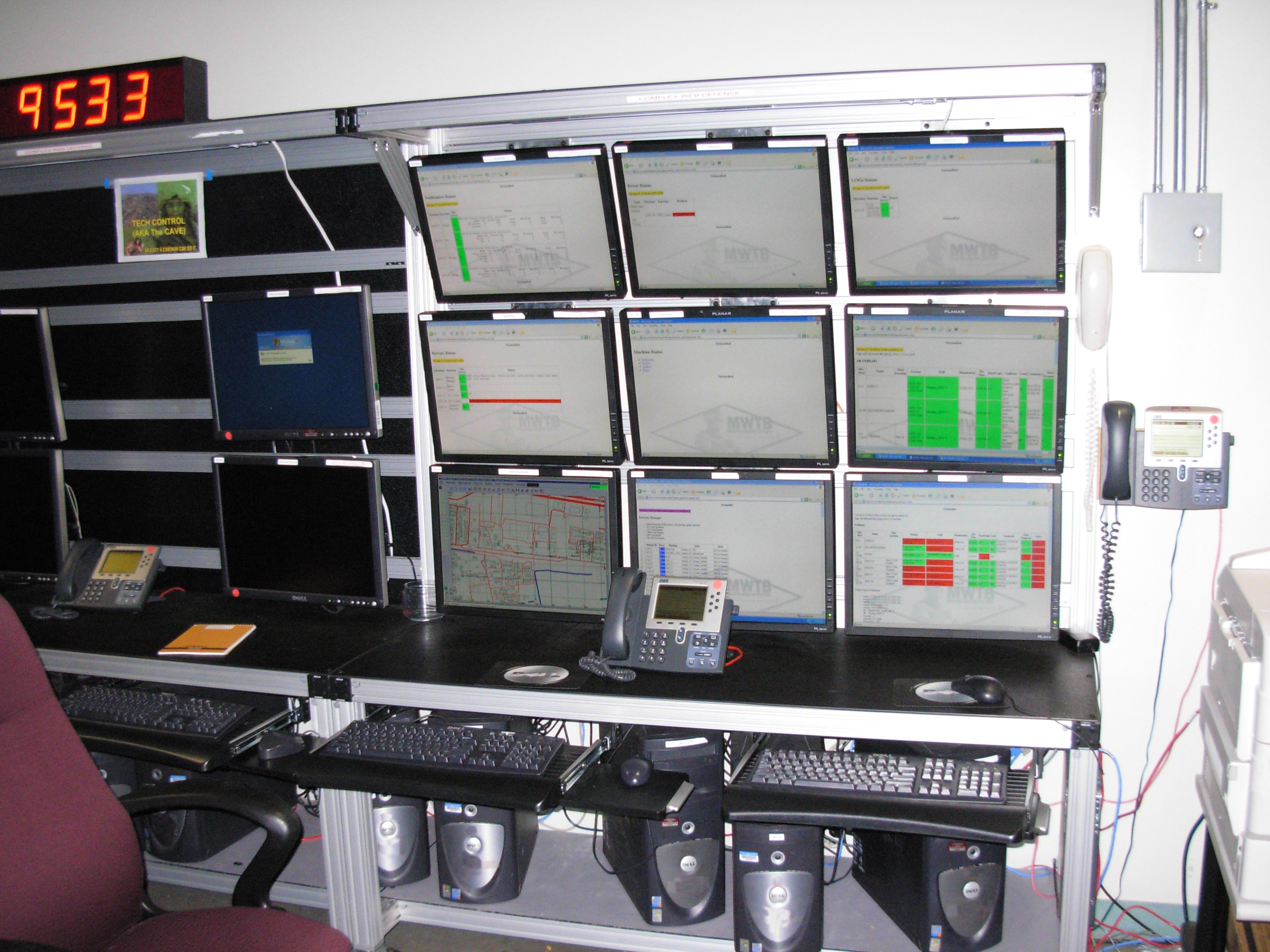
Tech Control

The Tech Control was a collection of tools that monitored a widely distributed simulation to ensure that configuration management and network performance standards were met. The tools, like the Reporter, the Exercise Manager, and the NetRouter, allowed Tech Control personnel to manage large exercises like COIN with high simulation availability.

=== Data Collection and Analysis ===
Data Collection and Analysis was primarily based on the collection and correlation of network simulation traffic (DIS PDUs). The data were written to flat files or directly to a Relational Database where they were further processed and analyzed to produce charts, graphs, tables, spreadsheets and presentations for the use of Army Operations Research / Systems Analysts (ORSAs).

=== Virtusphere ===
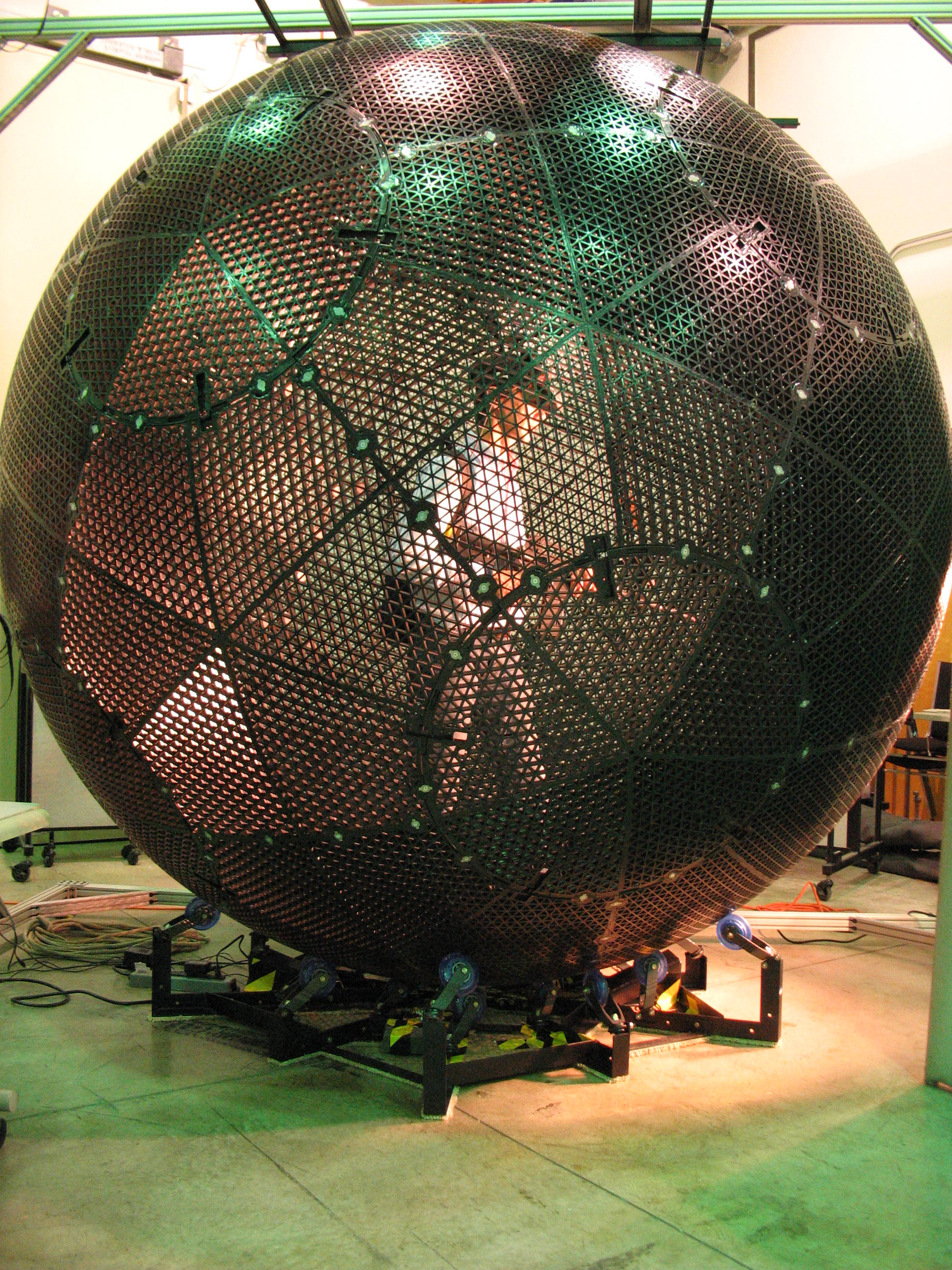
VirtuSphere simulator

The VirtuSphere was a single-soldier manned simulator that incorporates a large sphere that allows a human to walk around the simulated battlefield (like a hamster in a ball). It was based on the ACRT technology, and was used at the MWTB for experiments that examine future weapon systems and tactics and for evaluating soldier behavior.

The simulator was frequently seen at trade shows and science festivals, like the USA Science Festival, the San Diego Science Festival and the Jackson IT Day. It was typically one of the most popular exhibits.

== Names ==
- 1988: Created as SIMNET-D Mounted Warfare TestBed
- 1990: Renamed Close Combat TestBed (CCTB)
- 1994: Renamed Mounted Maneuver TestBed (MMBL)
- 2004: Renamed Unit of Action Battle Lab (UAMBL)
- 2008: Renamed Maneuver Battle Lab, Constructive and Virtual Simulation Division, Knox (MBL/CVSD-K)

== Contractors ==
The MWTB was always a government-owned, contractor-operated (GOCO) facility. The contractors were:

- 1988-1991: Bolt, Beranek and Newman (BBN)
- 1991-1996: Loral Corporation
- 1996-2010: Lockheed Martin

== Key Personnel ==
=== Contracting Officer's Technical Representative (COTR) ===
- 1990-1994: Maj Mark Chaney
- 1994-1996: Maj Jeff Wilkinson
- 1996-1998: Maj Mike Landers
- 1998-2005: Maj Joe Burns
- 2005-2008: Jim Cook
- 2008-2010: Steve Burzlaff

=== Site Manager ===
- 1988-1992: Dick Garvey
- 1992-1996: Thomas Radgowski
- 1996-1996: John Hughes
- 1996-2004: Don Appler
- 2004-2005: Eberhard Kieslich
- 2005-2010: Ray Bernhagen

=== Staff Photos ===
- 1996: Rob Smith, Ken Hunt, Cpt Joe Burns, Jim Lamb, Cpt ??, Jim Cook, Paul Monday, Don Appler, Eb Kieslich, Charles West, Don Debord, Maj Salisbury, Henry Hollingsworth, Berverly Burba, Sgt Vallera, Francis Alves, Carolyn Bow, Bud Maxson, Dan Shultz, Ron Fackler, Tom VanLaere, Linda Wulf
- 2002 Front Row: Eb Kieslich, Cindy Kobbins, Norbilyn Bernardo, Shawana Fax, Paul Monday, Caroline Johnson, Drew Bost, Becky FitzPatrick, Rita Hilton, Angela Scott, Renee Rhodes, John Weiss
- 2002 Back Row: Tom VanLaere, Ranetta Ballard, Mark Underwood, Phil Fraser, Dwight Mohler, Jack Smith, Maj Joe Burns, Charles West, Jon Embry, Don DeBord, Bob Gooden, Rob Smith, Tim Voss, Ron Fackler, Tony Ford, Dan Schultz, Don King, Steve Henry, Hans Hess, Lisa Hoffman, Henry Hollingsworth, Ray Bernhagen

== Logos ==
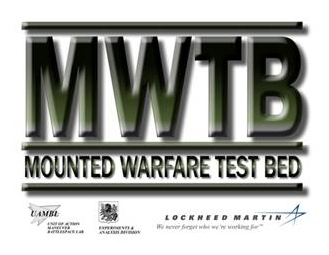
2005

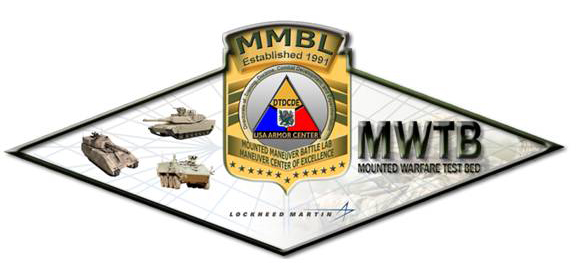
2006

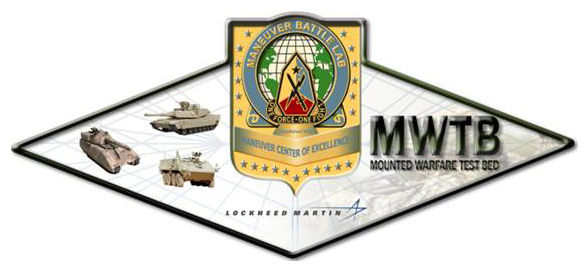
2007

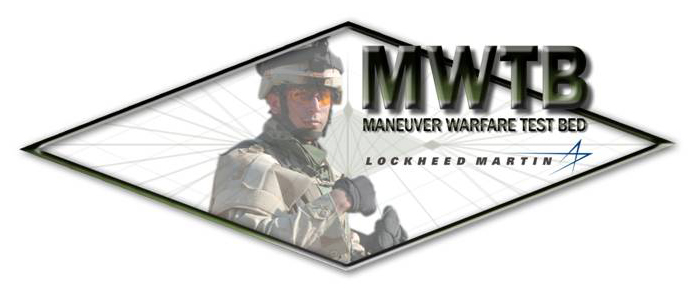
2009
