= Battle management language =

A Battle Management Language (BML) is the unambiguous language used to command and control forces and equipment conducting military operations and to provide situational awareness and a shared, common operational picture.

It can be seen as a standard digitized representation of a commander's intent to be used for real troops, simulated troops, and future robotic forces. BML is particularly relevant in a network centric environment for enabling mutual understanding.

The need for common BML was identified by the U.S. Army's Simulation to C4I Interoperability Overarching Integrated Product Team (SIMCI OIPT) and was originally defined in a paper titled Standardizing Battle Management Language - A Vital Move Towards the Army Transformation published by the Simulation Interoperability Standards Organization in 2001 . The same issues that have driven the Army to embark on this program also confront the other Services C4ISR and simulation systems, and future military operations. Acknowledging the significant need for training in joint environments to support future operations, SISO and other BML development efforts have expanded to encompass Joint BML (J-BML) for all military branches and ultimately to more recent work on establishing a Coalition BML (C-BML) for all Services and multinational coalition members promoting interoperability among their C4ISR systems and simulations, and also among systems employed in real-world operations.

== Coalition Battle Management Language ==
Coalition Battle Management Language (C-BML, CBML) is an unambiguous language to describe a commander's intent, to be understood by both live forces and automated systems, for multi-national simulated and real world operations. Following a meeting of subject matter experts at the Spring 2004 SIW, the Simulation Interoperability Standards Organization determined that a detailed evaluation of BML efforts at a coalition level was necessary and formally established a Coalition BML (C-BML) Study Group with Terms of Reference (TOR) identifying the following tasks:

• The Study Group shall conduct a Survey comprising as many international contributions applicable to the Coalition BML effort as possible.

• The Study Group shall develop a plan for how these various efforts can contribute to a common Coalition BML specification within a methodological framework.

• The Study Group shall formulate a set of Recommendations for a Coalition BML Product Development Group (PDG).

The Study Group meetings involved a membership of over 100 persons from 11 different countries and their recommendations were presented at the 2006 Spring SIW conference Spring SIW 2006 where the decision was made to establish a formal C-BML Product Development Group C-BML Product Development Group to develop an international simulation interoperability standard applicable to simulation systems, operational command and control systems, and also robotic systems.

== See also ==
- Glossary of military abbreviations
- List of established military terms
- Simulation Interoperability Standards Organization
- Intent (Military)
