= Local operational picture =

Military concept for an understanding of the local environment

Within military operations, a local operational picture (LOP) is a single identical display of relevant (operational) information of the battlespace (e.g. position of own troops and enemy troops, position and status of important infrastructure such as bridges, roads, etc.) constructed for local use.

A LOP is an emerging military concept. Although, there are literary examples that suggests that a LOP is for the use of a platoon commander and its coverage range is 250 meter radius. A LOP assists a platoon commander to achieve situational awareness.

== Relationship to the COP ==
Various LOPs may be shared electronically and fused into common operational picture (COP). Generally, sharing the LOP to form a COP implies that the LOP is replaced by the COP and hence has limited duration.

== Construction ==
A LOP is constructed with the aid of platform mounted/dismounted sensors that determine geo position and signatures.

== See also ==
- Battlespace
- Sensor fusion
- Almirante Clemente class destroyer#Sensors Signatures
- U.S. Military M274 Truck, Platform, Utility 1/2 Ton, 4X4
