= SIMNET =

SIMNET was a wide area network with vehicle simulators and displays for real-time distributed combat simulation: tanks, helicopters and airplanes in a virtual battlefield. SIMNET was developed for and used by the United States military. SIMNET development began in the mid-1980s, was fielded starting in 1987, and was used for training until successor programs came online well into the 1990s.

SIMNET was perhaps the world's first fully operational virtual reality system and was the first real time, networked simulator. It was not unlike the massive multiplayer games of today. It supported a variety of air and ground vehicles, some human-directed and others autonomous.

== Origins and purpose ==
Jack Thorpe of the Defense Advanced Research Projects Agency (DARPA) saw the need for networked multi-user simulation. Interactive simulation equipment was very expensive, and reproducing training facilities was likewise expensive and time consuming. In the early 1980s, DARPA decided to create a prototype research system to investigate the feasibility of creating a real-time distributed simulator for combat simulation. SIMNET, the resulting application, was to prove both the feasibility and effectiveness of such a project.

Training using actual equipment was extremely expensive and dangerous. Being able to simulate certain combat scenarios, and to have participants remotely located rather than all in one place, hugely reduced the cost of training and the risk of personal injury. Long-haul networking for SIMNET was run originally across multiple 56 kbit/s dial-up lines, using parallel processors to compress packets over the data links. This traffic contained not only the vehicle data but also compressed voice.

== Developers ==
SIMNET was developed by three companies: Delta Graphics, Inc.; Perceptronics, Inc.; and Bolt, Beranek and Newman (BBN), Inc. There was no prime contractor on SIMNET; independent contracts were made directly with each of these three companies. BBN developed the vehicle simulation and network software, as well as other software such as artillery, resupply, and semi-automated forces often used for opposing forces. Delta Graphics, based in Bellevue, Washington, developed the graphics system and terrain databases. Delta Graphics was eventually bought by BBN. Perceptronics, based in Los Angeles, was responsible for the actual SIMNET simulators; the company's engineers, human factors personnel and manufacturing team designed, developed and built over 300 full-crew simulators, integrating the controls, sound systems and visual systems into the special simulator shells; they also installed the simulators in a number of facilities in the US and Germany, trained the operators and supported the system for several years. BBN was responsible for developing the dynamic simulation software for each of the simulators, as well as the distributed networking communication software that kept each simulator informed of the position (and other state information) of other simulators that were within potential line-of-sight within the shared virtual environment. Each simulator maintained its own copy of this virtual environment, and broadcast its own state information to the other simulators.

== Network advancements ==
Since this was a networked simulation, each simulation station needed its own display of the shared virtual environment. The display stations themselves were mock-ups of certain tank and aircraft control simulators, and they were configured to simulate conditions within the actual combat vehicle. The tank simulators, for example, could accommodate a full four-person crew complement to enhance the effectiveness of the training. The network was designed to support up to several hundred users at once. The fidelity of the simulation was such that it could be used to train for mission scenarios and tactical rehearsals for operations performed during the U.S. actions in Desert Storm in 1992.

SIMNET used the concept of “dead reckoning” to correlate the positions of the objects and actors within the simulated environment. Duncan (Duke) Miller, the BBN SIMNET program manager, first used this term, which harks back to the earliest days of ship navigation, to explain how simulators were able to communicate state change information to each other while minimizing network traffic. Essentially, the approach involves calculating the current position of an object from its previous position and velocity (which is composed of vector and speed elements). The SIMNET protocols provided that whenever the true state of a simulator deviated by more than a certain threshold from its state as computed by dead reckoning, the simulator was obligated to send out a new state update message.

The use of SIMNET protocols and SIMNET-based training systems in the First Gulf War demonstrates the success of the SIMNET, and its legacy was viewed as proof that realtime interactive networked cooperative virtual simulation is possible for a large user population. Later, the Terrestrial Wideband Network (a high speed descendant of the ARPANET that ran at T1 speeds) was used to carry traffic. This network remained under DARPA after the rest of ARPANET was merged with NSFNet and the ARPANET was decommissioned.

== Graphics advancements ==
In addition to the network, the second fundamental challenge at the time SIMNET was conceived was the inability of graphics systems to handle large numbers of moving models. For example, most contemporary flight simulators used binary space partitioning which is computationally effective for fixed environments since polygon display order (i.e., their depth coherence) can be pre-computed. While suitable for flight simulators, which largely have a point of view above the Earth's fixed surface, this technique is ineffective near the ground, where the order in which polygons overlay each other changes with the location of the point of view. It is also ineffective with a large number of moving models, since moving a model changes its depth coherence relative to the polygons representing the ground.

In contrast, Z-buffer techniques do not depend on pre-computed depth coherence and were therefore a key enabling technology for SIMNET's on-ground point of view and large numbers of moving vehicles. Z-buffering is memory intensive relative to Binary Space Partitioning but was made possible in part because the cost of RAM at the time had dropped significantly in price.

Z-buffering puts overlapping textured polygons in an order to be rendered, farthest from the viewer to closest. Depth Complexity is created when rendering overlapping textures and if to great can cause RAM overloads. This is still true in today's real-time engines. The 3D Modelers who worked on the project had to take many new concepts into consideration when creating the environments and models. At that time, to transfer environment and vehicle model textures to the simulator the artist would burn the texture files to a prom device and install that piece of hardware into each simulator, on-site. All of the 2D and 3D creation tools were written by the BBN programmers, in-house. They also created the simulator engine and networking software. SIMNET poster SIMNET video

SIMNET used Z-buffer displays developed by Delta Graphics. Delta Graphics was founded by Drew Johnston (SW development), Mike Cyrus (President), both from the Boeing Aerospace Company/Graphics Lab, and Jay Beck (CTO and VP), a 3D graphics consultant of Softtool Consulting. The graphics processor, the GDP, custom developed for SIMNET by Gary Wilson (Sr HW Engineer), won out over existing Silicon Graphics HW because of its low cost and because its architecture. It was the first simulator display processor to use a frame buffer and Z-buffer algorithms on a per display channel basis to show the simulated view.

== Use for Army training ==
SIMNET was actively used by the U.S. Army for training primarily at Fort Benning, Fort Rucker, and Fort Knox. Additional temporary and permanent locations were in Fort Leavenworth and Grafenwoehr, Germany. It was also used to test vehicles still in development.

== Follow-on programs ==
The follow-on protocols to SIMNET were called Distributed Interactive Simulation; the primary U.S. Army follow-on program was the Close Combat Tactical Trainer (CCTT).

The SIMNET-D (Developmental) program used simulation systems developed in the SIMNET program to perform experiments in weapon systems, concepts, and tactics. It became the Advanced Simulation Technology Demonstration (ADST) program. It fostered the creation of the Battle Labs across the US Army, including the Mounted Warfare TestBed at Ft Knox, KY, the Soldier Battle Lab at Ft Benning, GA, the Air Maneuver Battle Lab at Ft Rucker, AL, the Fires Battle Lab at Ft Sill, OK.

Additional research programs after the end of SIMNET included work in weather and real-time terrain modifications.

== Companies and technologies founded based on SIMNET experience ==
- RTIME, Inc (Rolland Waters), Rolland Waters has been responsible for significant networking advances as well as the integration of speech recognition into several platforms. His first startup, RTIME, was acquired by Sony to form the core of the PlayStation Network.
- MVRsimulation Inc. (W. Garth Smith), MVRsimulation is a privately held small virtual business that develops software and 3D content for building and rendering 3D simulated environments.
- MaK Technologies (John Morrison and Warren Katz), which continues to provide simulation software
- Reality by Design, Inc (Joanne West Metzger and Paul Metzger), simulation and training software and systems
- Zipper Interactive (Brian Soderberg), which developed the SOCOM PS2 game series and was also purchased by SCEA
- Wiz!Bang (Drew Johnston), another game developer. Drew Johnston currently is the Product Unit Manager (PUM) for the Windows Gaming Platform team at Microsoft.
