= Integrated product team =

Multidisciplinary group delivering a product or process

An integrated product team (IPT) is a multidisciplinary group of people who are collectively responsible for delivering a defined product or process.

IPTs are used in complex development programs/projects for review and decision making. The emphasis of the IPT is on involvement of all stakeholders (users, customers, management, developers, contractors) in a collaborative forum. IPTs may be addressed at the program level, but there may also be Oversight IPTs (OIPTs), or Working-level IPTs (WIPTs). IPTs are created most often as part of structured systems engineering methodologies, focusing attention on understanding the needs and desires of each stakeholder.

IPTs were introduced to the U.S. Department of Defense in 1995 as part of "a fundamental change in the way the Department acquires goods and services".
