= USAFE Warrior Preparation Center =

USAFE-AFAFRICA Warfare Center

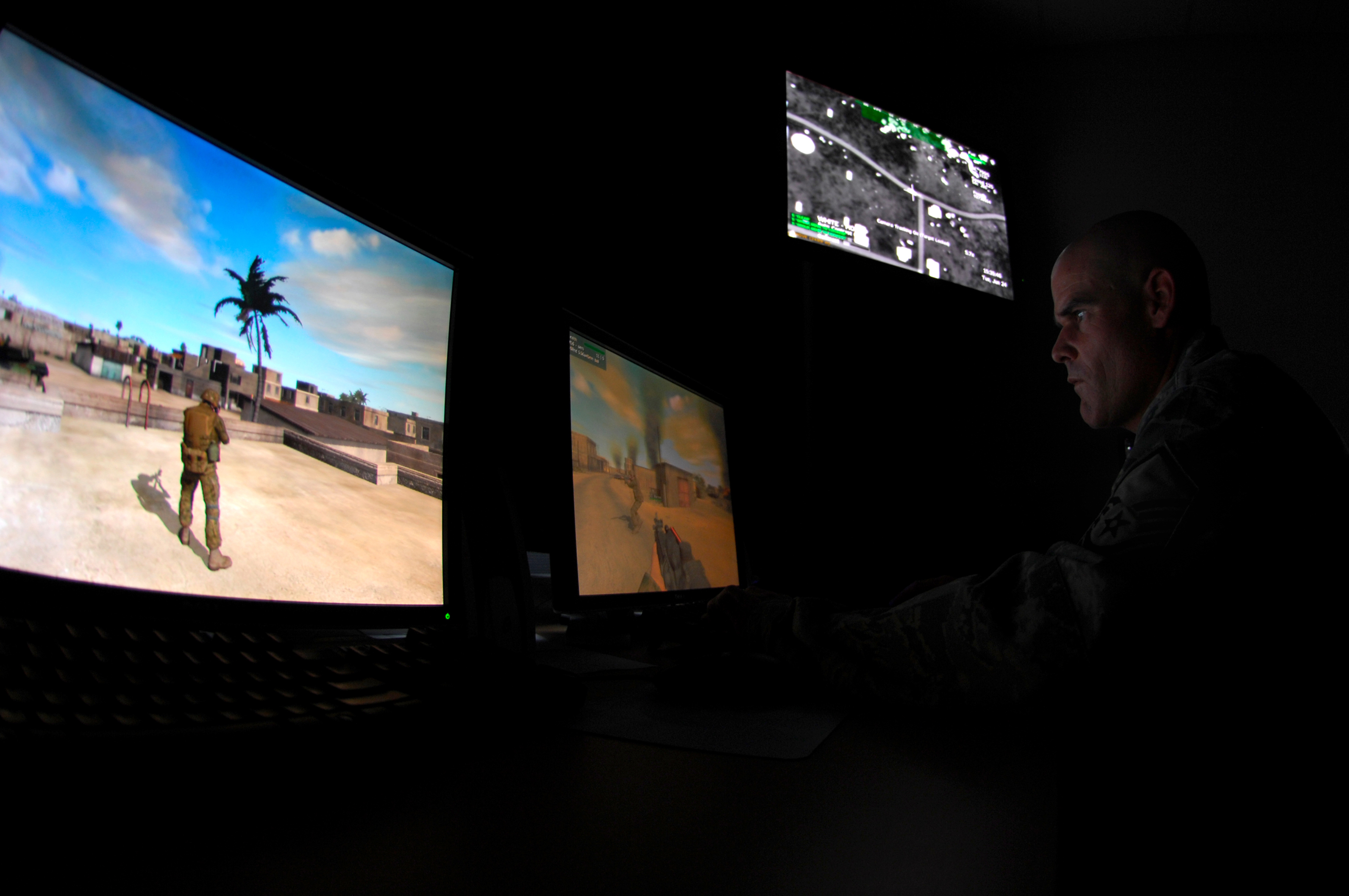
- Combat training using the Rover III Operations System at Einsiedlerhof Air Station, Germany.
- Active: 1983–present
- Country: United States
- Branch: United States Air Force
- Role: Combat Training
- Part of: 86th Mission Support Group, 86th Airlift Wing
- Garrison/HQ: Einsiedlerhof Air Station
- Motto: Prepare to Win

Insignia
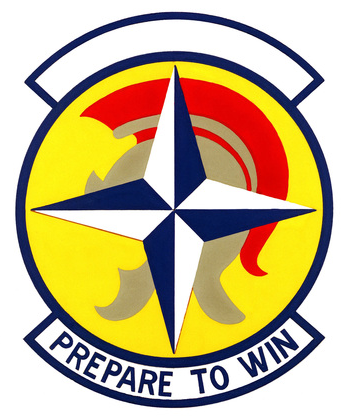
- USAFE Warrior Preparation Center emblem (approved 1984)

The United States Air Forces in Europe and Air Forces Africa (USAFE-AFAFRICA) Warfare Center is located at Einsiedlerhof Air Station, Germany (near Ramstein Air Base). It provides combat readiness training for USAFE forces with advanced simulation software.

The center's mission is to provide combat readiness training for United States Air Forces Europe (USAFE) forces. The center supports Tier 1 through Tier 4 training (Strategic through Tactical) via the Distributed Training Center connecting with other bases throughout the world. These missions are accomplished with advanced simulation software.

== History ==
The USAFE Warrior Preparation Center was founded in 1983 by Colonel "Moody" Suter, who also developed the Air Force's Red Flag exercises, at Einsiedlerhof Air Station, Germany. Originally designed to train USAFE forces, in 2009 it expanded to include training for Air Forces Africa.

In November 2017, the center added the Joint Terminal Attack Controller (JTAC) domed simulator to its systems. The simulator is designed to support training for JTACs in the performance of terminal control, terminal guidance, close air support, and joint fires operations training. The simulator uses multiple 4K projectors to display a 270 degree field of view for the JTACs. They use emulated binoculars, night vision devices, and M4 carbine during their training. The center plans to use the simulator in future large scale exercises including Spartan Eagle Exercises that include airmen stationed stateside.

In September 2016, the other units of the 86th Mission Support Group included the 86th Communications Squadron, 700th Contracting Squadron, 86th Security Forces Squadron, 569th U.S. Forces Police Squadron, the 86th and 786th Force Support Squadrons, the Deployment Transition Center, the 2nd Air Postal Squadron and the Airman Leadership School.

== Lineage ==
- Constituted as the United States Air Forces in Europe Warrior Preparation Center on 12 August 1983

Activated on 18 August 1983

=== Stations ===
- Einsiedlerhof Air Station, 18 August 1983 – present

=== Assignments ===
- 86th Combat Support Group, 18 August 1983
- 377th Combat Support Wing, 14 June 1985
- 86th Support Group (later 86th Mission Support Group), 1 May 1991
- 435th Air Base Wing, 15 January 2004
- 86th Mission Support Group, 16 July 2009 – present
