= Common operational picture =

Military technology

A common operational picture (COP) is a single identical display of relevant (operational) information (e.g. position of own troops and enemy troops, position and status of important infrastructure such as bridges, roads, etc.) shared by more than one Command. A COP facilitates collaborative planning and combined execution and assists all echelons to achieve situational awareness.

A commander's headquarters is typically responsible for ensuring that the appropriate information is presented to the commander, so that he can make the best command decisions. Traditionally, headquarters prepares maps with various symbols to show the locations of friendly and enemy troops and other relevant information. In the modern military, the COP is prepared electronically by a command and control battle command system (e.g. Army Battle Command System).

Beyond planning, a COP enables effective, dynamic execution. The term "Common" means it applies to all involved, from highest commander to the lowest soldier to the attached airman. "Operational" refers to actual, preferably in real-time, status and developments (which rarely fit the plan generated days/hours/moments ago) and it also refers to being at the operational planning level which is a summation and summary of many tactical scales and not of the broader, strategic level. "Picture" refers to a single, combined, graphics, visual representation of the environment, forces, and actions. Taken together, a COP enables tactical units at the lowest echelon to the highest commander to independently and immediately sense and act in a collaborative fashion to achieve the predefined mission and commander's intent. An example of such a tool is ATAK or Windows Tactical Awareness Kit(WINTAK).

== See also ==
- Battlespace
- Local operational picture
