= Operational Test and Evaluation Force =

U.S. Navy organization for operational testing and evaluation

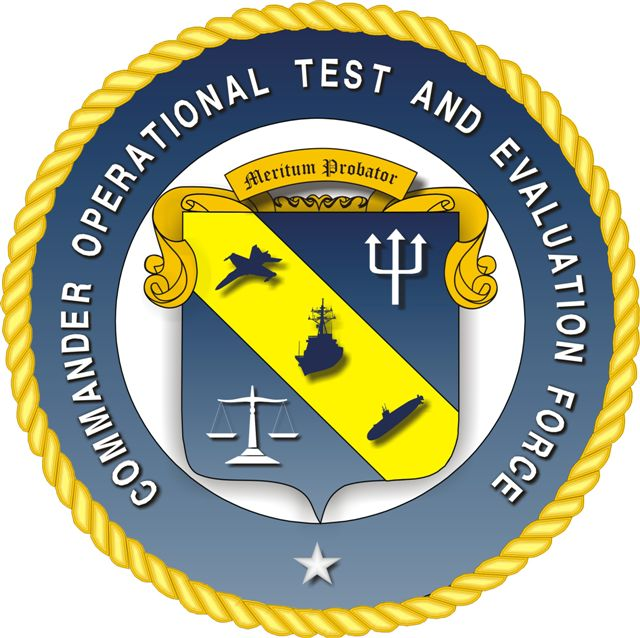
- Operational Test and Evaluation Force (OPTEVFOR) seal
- Active: December, 1947 – Present
- Country: United States of America
- Branch: United States Navy
- Type: Systems Operational Testing and Evaluation (OT&E)
- Part of: Office of the Chief of Naval Operations (OPNAV) - N091
- Garrison/HQ: Norfolk Naval Base, Virginia

Commanders
- Commander: Rear Admiral Stephen R. Tedford, USN
- Chief of Staff: Captain Rolando Ramirez
- Command Master Chief: Master Chief Michael Wentzel

The Operational Test and Evaluation Force (OPTEVFOR) is an independent and objective agency within the United States Navy for the operational testing and evaluation (OT&E) of naval aviation, surface warfare, submarine warfare, C4I, cryptologic, and space systems in support Navy and Department of Defense acquisition programs.

== History ==
OPTEVFOR traces its origins to the final months of World War II when the need arose for an effective means to combat Japanese kamikaze attacks. On 2 July 1945, the Composite Task Force, U.S. Atlantic Fleet, was formed to develop tactics and evaluate equipment to counter the Kamikazes. This force was commanded by Vice Admiral Willis A. Lee, USN, and consisted of miscellaneous types of combatant ships and drone aircraft.

Following the end of World War II, the Composite Task Force was consolidated with other fleet units doing development work and in December 1947, was re-designated as the Operational Development Force (OPDEVFOR), with the force commander flying his flag on the USS Adirondack (AGC 15), as an operational command reporting to Commander-in-Chief of the U.S. Atlantic Fleet. In 1949, the command moved ashore to the Norfolk Naval Base. With its expanding OT&E responsibilities, a subordinate liaison command, located the San Diego Naval Base, created to serve as a liaison with the U.S. Pacific Fleet.

VX-6 was one of six air development squadrons formed by the United States Navy beginning in 1946 to develop and evaluate aircraft tactics and techniques. These squadrons were initially directed by the Operational Development Force, which was redesignated in May 1959 as the Operational Test and Evaluation Force (OPTEVFOR). These six squadrons were initially designated as VX-1 (tail code XA), VX-2 (tail code XB), VX-3 (tail code XC), VX-4 (tail code XF), VX-5 (tail code XE) and VX-6 (tail code XD). On 1 January 1969, the surviving Air Development Squadrons (VX-1, VX-4, VX-5 and VX-6) became Air Test and Evaluation Squadrons. Their designations were changed to VXE-1, VXE-4, VXE-5 and VXE-6. Their tail codes of these squadrons were changed to JA, JF, JE and JD, respectively.

In May 1959, the command was renamed Operational Test and Evaluation Force (OPTEVFOR) to reflect more accurately its increased responsibilities regarding weapon systems and tactics testing and evaluation (T&E). In 1960, the OPTEVFOR headquarters moved to its present location, located off Terminal Boulevard near the U.S. Atlantic Fleet headquarters.

Due to Congressional and DOD initiatives to improve the defense acquisition process, in 1971, OPTEVFOR was designated the Navy's sole (OT&E) agency, with greater involvement in the research and development (R&D) process and production decision-making process. In keeping with these expanded responsibilities, the Force Commander (COMOPTEVFOR) began reporting directly to the Chief of Naval Operations (CNO).

In 2013, the COMOPTEVFOR was the lead operational test agency who, along with Joint Staff, J6 Joint Deployable Analysis Team (JDAT), coordinated the 11th Bold Quest coalition demonstration. Warfighters, technology teams and testers under the flags of 10 nations and each of the U.S. military services came together at Marine Corps Air Station Cherry Point, N.C. to stress test the IFF integrated suite and Aegis ballistic missile defense system Mode 5 in partnership with COMOPTEVFOR under 13 separate initiatives. JDAT assisted the COMOPTEVFOR with Identification Friend or Foe (IFF) Mode 5 Level 1 Joint Operational Test Approach analysis to validate the interoperability of fielded combat systems and served as COMOPTEVFOR's lead analysis organization, responsible for all reconstruction and coordination of issues with Service program offices, and producing a detail report of results for submission to DOT&E.

== Mission ==
=== Scope of Responsibilities ===
OPTEVFOR provides OT&E policy direction, technical and procedural guidance, and financial support for the independent and objective testing and evaluation of the systems and tactics at the direction of the Chief of Naval Operations (CNO). In terms of its relationship to operational fleet units, OPTEVFOR is supported by the Commander, U.S. Fleet Forces Command (COMUSFF); the Commander, U.S. Pacific Fleet (COMPACFLT); and the Commander, U.S. Naval Forces Europe (COMUSNAVEUR). It also closely follows all R&D programs within the Navy and its laboratories (including the Office of Naval Research), with the CNO authorizing direct liaison between OPTEVFOR and the heads of development agencies involving all technical matters for Navy research, development, testing, and evaluation. Evaluation of systems are done by personnel with technical experience with the equipment being tested and evaluated. Finally, OPTEVFOR coordinates operational test and evaluation (OT&E) activities with the operational test agencies of the other U.S. military services as well as the DOD Director of Operational Test and Evaluation, who establishes operational test policy for the U.S. Defense Department.

=== Fleet RDT&E Support Process ===
The Fleet Research, Development, Test & Evaluation (RDT&E) Support Process conforms to the most current version of SECNAVINST 5000.2 pertaining to Navy or multi-service testing and evaluation (T&E) activities. It recommends that T&E requests for fleet commander support be made in writing, via CNO-OPNAV (N091/N912), nine (9) month prior to the actual testing activity. The Fleet RDT&E Support Process defines the appropriate formats for request for T&E activities. Fleet RDT&E Support Process defines the levels of fleet commander support as follows:

- Dedicated support, which precludes employment of the supporting unit(s) in other missions.
- Concurrent support, which permits employment of the supporting unit(s) in activities other than RDT&E support, but could have an operational impact upon unit employment.
- Not-to-interfere-basis (NIB) support, which permits RDT&E operational employment of the supporting unit(s) without significant interference with primary mission accomplishment.

The Fleet RDT&E Support Process also mandates that all T&E requests be submitted and updated on a quarterly basis beginning nine (9) months prior to the quarter that the T&R activity in order to provide adequate scheduling for the fleet command, and mandates that CNO-OPNAV (N091/N912) be promptly notified of any cancellations. The Fleet RDT&E Support Process defines prioritization of fleet commander support for T&E activities as follows:

- Priority One - Fleet commander support of a T&E activity takes precedence over normal fleet operations.
- Priority Two - Fleet commander support of a T&E activity takes precedence within normal fleet operations.
- Priority Three - Normal fleet operations take precedence over fleet commander support of a T&E activity.

Finally, the Fleet RDT&E Support Process also defines unscheduled RDT&E support requirements, including the appropriate format for Emergency Fleet Support Requests. The Commander, Operational Test and Evaluation Force (COMOPTEVFOR) is designated as the RDT&E fleet-support scheduling agent for CNO (N091), including all at-sea operational test and evaluation (OT&E) activities.

== Organization ==
=== Command Staff ===
- Commander Operational Test and Evaluation Force (COMOPTEVFOR) is designated by Chief of Naval Operations to be the sole OT&E authority for the United States Navy, with responsibility for establishing OT&E policy while serving as liaison with senior and subordinate commands throughout the DOD regarding the U.S. Navy's OT&E issues.
- Chief of Staff handles the day-to-day operations of the COMOPTEVFOR and its Flag Staff.

=== Divisions ===
==== Administration ====
- COMOPTEVFOR Command Administration Section - This section, under the Assistant Chief of Staff for Administration, who is double hatted as the Commanding Officer, Staff, oversees pay, personnel records, medical, dental, mailroom operations, central files, and other administrative functions, and is the primary liaison between the command and the Personnel Support Detachment.

==== Aviation Warfare ====
The Aviation Warfare Division is responsible for the planning and execution of operational testing and evaluation (OT&E) activities pertaining to the Navy and Marine Corps' aviation acquisition programs. Testing of these programs are done at the following field activities:

- VX-1 - Naval Air Station Patuxent River at Patuxent River, Maryland
- VX-9 - Naval Air Weapons Station China Lake at China Lake, California
- VX-9 Detachment Edwards - Edwards Air Force Base near Lancaster, California
- VMX-1 - Marine Corps Air Station New River near Jacksonville, North Carolina, and Marine Corps Air Station Yuma near Yuma, Arizona
- HMX-1 - Marine Corps Air Facility Quantico near Triangle, Virginia.

These programs include strike/fighter, assault weapon, airborne electronic warfare, air-based anti-submarine warfare, aviation maintenance, and trainer systems.

- Air C4I & Trainer Systems - This section is responsible for E-2C airborne early warning systems and related trainer programs, including:
  - C-2A(r) Greyhound Block Upgrade/Service Life Extension Program (SLEP)
  - E-2C Combined Engagement Capability (CEC)
  - E-2C Mission Computer Upgrade (MCU) Program
  - Joint Primary Aircraft Training System (JPATS)
- Air Electronic Warfare Programs - This section is responsible for Navy and Marine Corps aviation airborne early warning (AEW) programs, including:
  - EA-6B Block 89A Aircraft Upgrade
  - EA-6B Improved Capability III (ICAP III)
- Air Weapons Systems – This section is responsible for air-to-ground missile, air-to-air missiles, and mission planning programs, including:
  - AGM-88 High Speed Anti-Radiation Missile (HARM)
  - AGM-158 Joint Air-to-Surface Standoff Missile (JASSM)
  - Joint Standoff Weapon (JSOW B/C)
  - AIM-9X Evolved Sidewinder
  - AIM-120 Advanced Medium-Range Air-to-Air Missile (AMRAAM)
  - Joint Direct Attack Munitions (JDAM)
  - Standoff Land Attack Missile Expanded Response (SLAM-ER)
- Avionics and Support Systems - This section is responsible for all aviation maintenance programs, including:
  - Active Electronically Scanned Array (AESA)
  - Advanced Tactical Airborne Reconnaissance System (ATARS)
  - Traffic Alert and Collision Avoidance System (TCAS)
- Carrier and Amphibious Support - This section is responsible for all assault support helicopters, combat support helicopters, and fixed-wing and rotary-wing ASW aircraft, combat search and rescue (CSAR) aircraft, airborne mine warfare programs, and the V-22 Osprey.
- Carrier Strike - This section is responsible for all F/A-18 Hornet, F/A-18E/F Super Hornet, and related programs.
- Future Programs – This section works closely with requirements officers, program offices, and contractors on future projects and systems, including:
  - CVN-21
  - Joint Strike Fighter (JSF)
- Modeling, Simulation and Analysis - This section provides analytical support and technical advice on modeling and simulation issues for operational testing throughout the Aviation Warfare Division.

==== C4I & Space ====
The C4I & Space Division responsible for the planning and execution of operational test and evaluation (OT&E) activities pertaining to the Navy's ashore and afloat command, control, communications, computer and intelligence (C4I) systems.

- Automated Information Operations - This section performs operational test and evaluation for ashore and afloat automated information systems.
- Command, Control, (C2) and Intelligence - This section performs operational testing and evaluation for ashore and afloat command and control systems, intelligence and imagery systems, tactical information management, decision support, and meteorological and oceanographic (METOC) systems.
- COTF Pacific (San Diego SPAWAR Detachment) - The OPTEVFOR Pacific Detachment (SPAWAR Liaison Office - San Diego) provides on-site OT&E expertise to assist system developers and program managers in the southern California.
- Information Warfare - This section performs operational testing and evaluation for ashore and afloat information warfare systems, including all UAV programs.
- Software, Modeling, and Simulation Analysis - The section is responsible to the Operational Test Director (OTD) for all analytical aspects of planning and evaluating the operational testing of C4I systems.
- Tactical Data and Support - This section performs operational testing and evaluation for ashore and afloat tactical data systems, tactical link systems, and tactical training systems.
- Space and Navigation Systems - This section performs operational testing and evaluation for ashore and afloat communication systems, electronic navigation systems, and other space-based systems.
- Terrestrial Communications and Radar Systems - This section performs operational testing and evaluation for ashore and afloat communication systems, Identification Friend or Foe (IFF), and radar systems.

==== Comptroller ====
The Comptroller/Resource Management Division provides the plans, programs, and budgets of OPTEVFOR's fiscal resources.

==== Expeditionary Warfare ====
The Expeditionary Warfare Division is responsible for the planning and execution of operational test and evaluation (OT&E) activities of Joint Chemical/Biological traditional acquisition programs, Anti-Terrorist Force Protection (ATFP) programs, Explosive Ordnance Disposal (EOD), riverine warfare, and diving and salvage programs.

- ATFP Section - This section is responsible for ATFP programs, including detection, delay, deterrence, assessment, and response functions for protecting government assets. Programs include:
  - Access Control and Vehicle Inspections
  - Navy Emergency Response Management System (NERMS)
  - Commander, Navy Region Mid-Atlantic (CNRMA) Information Management Pilot Program (IMPP)
  - Wide Area Alert/Notification (WAAN)
  - Reconnaissance - Unmanned Ground Vehicles, Flight Line Radar, Adaptive Network
  - Virtual Perimeter Monitoring System (VPMS)
  - Joint Modular Intermodal Distribution System (JMIDS)
- Chemical/Biological Acquisition Programs Section - This section is responsible for the planning and executing of operational testing and evaluation of traditional chemical and biological programs, including:
  - Joint Biological Agent Identification and Diagnosis System (JBAIDS)
  - Joint Biological Point Detection System (JBPDS)
  - Joint Biological Standoff Detection System (JBSDS)
  - Joint Chemical Agent Detector (JCAD)
  - Joint Effects Model (JEM)
  - Joint Operational Effects Federation (JOEF)
  - Joint Services Lightweight Standoff Chemical Agent Detector (JSLSCAD)
- EOD/Riverine/Diving & Salvage - This section is responsible for EOD, riverine warfare, and diving and salvage programs, including:
  - Acoustic Firing System (AFS)
  - Advanced Radiographic System Program (ARS)
  - Counter Bomb/Counter Bomber (CB2) Advanced Concept Technology Demonstration/Demonstrator (ACTD)
  - Joint Explosive Ordnance Disposal (JEOD)
  - Magneto-Inductive Signaling Device System (MISDS)
  - Main Charge Disrupter (MCD)
  - Medium Disposal Explosive Tool (MDET)
  - Next Generation Underwater Breathing Apparatus (NUBA)
  - Non-Lethal Weapons Technology (NLWT)
  - Remote Activation Munitions System XM-152 (RAMS)
  - Sea Eagle Advanced Concept Technology Demonstration/Demonstrator (ACTD)
  - Special Warfare Demolition Firing Device (EX-51)
  - Submarine Rescue Diving and Recompression System (SRDRS)
  - Swimmer Detection Sonar (SDS) System
  - Sympathetic Detonation (SYDET)

==== Information Resources (IR) ====
The Information Resources Division assists the staff with current and planned automated information systems (AIS), technology and office automation, and telecommunications, including hardware and software support, configuration control and management, requirements analysis and system analysis, design recommendations, and user training.

==== Security ====
The Security Division oversees and coordinates OPTEVFOR security policy and programs.

==== Surface Warfare ====
The Surface Warfare Division is responsible for the planning and execution of operational test and evaluation (OT&E) activities of U. S. Navy surface ships and associated engineering, auxiliary, combat systems, and systems, as well as the U. S. Coast Guard's Deepwater acquisition program.

- Area Air Defense Section - This section is responsible for planning and executing operational testing and evaluation of U.S. Navy medium-range and long-range air defense systems, including:
  - Aegis Ballistic Missile Defense (ABMD)
  - AN/SPY-1 Aegis radar system
  - Arleigh Burke-class (DDG 51) guide-missile destroyers
  - RIM-66 Standard Missile-2 Block IIIB (SM-2 BLK IIIB)
  - RIM-162 Evolved Sea Sparrow Missile (ESSM)
- Modeling & Analysis - This section provides analytical support for all surface warfare projects.
- Naval Surface Strike/DD(X) - This section is responsible for the planning and execution of the operational testing and evaluation of cruise missiles, associated fire control systems, and the DD(X) program, including:
  - BGM-109 Tomahawk Missile System
  - BGM-109 Advanced Tomahawk Weapon Control System (ATWCS)
  - RGM-84 Harpoon Block 1CR Weapon System
  - Naval Surface Fire Support (NSFS)
  - Land Attack Destroyer (DD(X))
- Point Defense Systems - This section is responsible for planning and executing the operational testing and evaluation of U. S. Navy short-range air and surface defense systems, including:
  - AN/SPQ-9B Radar
  - AN/SSQ-129A Shipboard Protection System
  - AN/SPS-74 Radar
  - AN/SPY-3 Multi-Function Radar (MFR)
  - Close-In Weapon System (CIWS)
  - RIM-116 Rolling Airframe Missile (RAM)
  - Ship Self Defense System (SSDS)
  - Volume Search Radar (VSR)
- Total Ship Amphibibious - This section is responsible for planning and executing the operational testing and evaluation of amphibious warfare ships, including:
  - San Antonio-class (LPD-17 class) amphibious transport dock
  - Amphibious Assault Ship Replacement (LHA(R))
- Total Ship Combatant/CLF - This section is responsible for planning and executing of the operational testing and evaluation of surface combatants, combat logistics force (CLF) ships and strategic sealift ships, including:
  - Auxiliary Cargo and Ammunition Ship (T-AKE)
  - Improved Naval Lighterage System (INLS)
  - Littoral Combat Ship (LCS)
  - Strategic Sealift Program (SSP)
- U. S. Coast Guard Deepwater System - This section is responsible for planning and executing the operational testing and evaluation of U.S. Coast Guard's next-generation surface, aviation, command and control, and logistics assets developed as part of its Integrated Deepwater System Program, included:
  - 110-123’ WPB Conversion
  - C-130J Long Range Search (LRS)
  - Fast Response Cutter (FRC)
  - Long Range Interceptor (LRI)
  - Medium Range Search Maritime Patrol Aircraft (MRS MPA)
  - Multi-Mission Cutter Helicopter (MCH)
  - Offshore Patrol Cutter (OPC)
  - National Security Cutter (NSC)
  - Short Range Prosecutor (SRP)
  - Vertical-takeoff-and-landing (VTOL) Unmanned Aerial Vehicle (VUAV)

==== Training ====
The Training Division provides general military and acquisition-specific training as well as that which is acquisition specific.

==== Undersea Warfare ====
Tests and evaluates all undersea warfare systems, including submarine, surface and aviation anti-submarine warfare and mine warfare systems.

- Administrative Support - This section provides administrative and personnel support services to the division.
- C4I and Wires - This section isis responsible for operationally testing submarine C4I systems, including such programs as:
  - Photonics mast (AN/BVS-1)
  - Submarine local area network (SubLAN)
- Mine Warfare - This section is responsible for the operationally testing and evaluation of all mine warfare systems.
  - Remote mine-hunting system (RMS)
  - Surface mine counter measure unmanned undersea vehicles (SMCM UUV)
- Platforms System - This section is responsible for operationally testing for all anti-submarine warfare and related systems, including such programs as:
  - Advanced SEAL delivery system (ASDS)
  - SSGN conversion
  - Virginia-class (SSN-774 class) submarines
- Submarine ASW - This section is responsible for the operational testing and evaluation of all submarine-based anti-submarine warfare systems, including such programs as:
  - Mark 48 advanced capability (ADCAP) torpedo
  - Mark 54 lightweight hybrid torpedo (LHT)
- Surface/Air ASW - This section is responsible for operationally testing and evaluation of all surface and aerial anti-submarine warfare systems, including such programs as:
  - AN/UQQ-2 Surveillance Towed Array Sensor System (SURTASS) upgrades
  - Littoral combat ship (LCS) ASW mission packages

=== OPTEVFOR Facilities ===
OPTEVFOR exercises operational control over four aircraft squadrons that conduct operational test and evaluation (OT&E) programs:

- Air Test and Evaluation Squadron One (VX-1) at Naval Air Station Patuxent River
- Air Test and Evaluation Squadron Nine (VX-9) at the Naval Air Weapons Station China Lake
- U.S Marine Helicopter Test and Evaluation Squadron One (HMX-1) at the U.S. Marine Corps Air Facility Quantico
- U.S. Marine Tiltrotor Operational Test and Evaluation Squadron Twenty-Two (VMX-22) at the U.S. Marine Corps Air Station New River

OPTEVFOR also maintains a detachment at the SPAWAR Systems Center Liaison Office at the San Diego Naval Base, California.

=== Task Force 142 ===
The Operational Test and Evaluation Force (COMOPTEVFOR) is listed as Task Force 142 under the United States Fleet Forces Command. However OPTEVFOR is a direct report agency to the Chief of Naval Operations.

== See also ==
- Director, Operational Test and Evaluation (DOT&E)
- Joint Interoperability Test Command (JITC)
- Office of Naval Research (ONR)
- U.S. Air Force Operational Test and Evaluation Center (AFOTEC)
- U.S. Army Test and Evaluation Command (ATEC)
- U.S Marine Corps Operational Test and Evaluation Activity (MCOTEA)
- U.S. Naval Research Laboratory (NRL)

== Selected bibliography ==
- Fleet RDT&E Support Process - OPTEVFOR
- SECNAVINST 5000.2C Implementation and Operation of the Defense Acquisition System and the Joint Capabilities Integration and Development System dated 19 November 2004 - Secretary of the Navy - U.S. Department of the Navy
- SECNAVINST 5000.2B Implementation and Operation of the Defense Acquisition System and the Joint Capabilities Integration and Development System dated 6 December 1996 - Secretary of the Navy = U.S. Department of the Navy
