= Lockheed Martin F-35 Lightning II development =

Development program of American aircraft

F-35 Lightning II
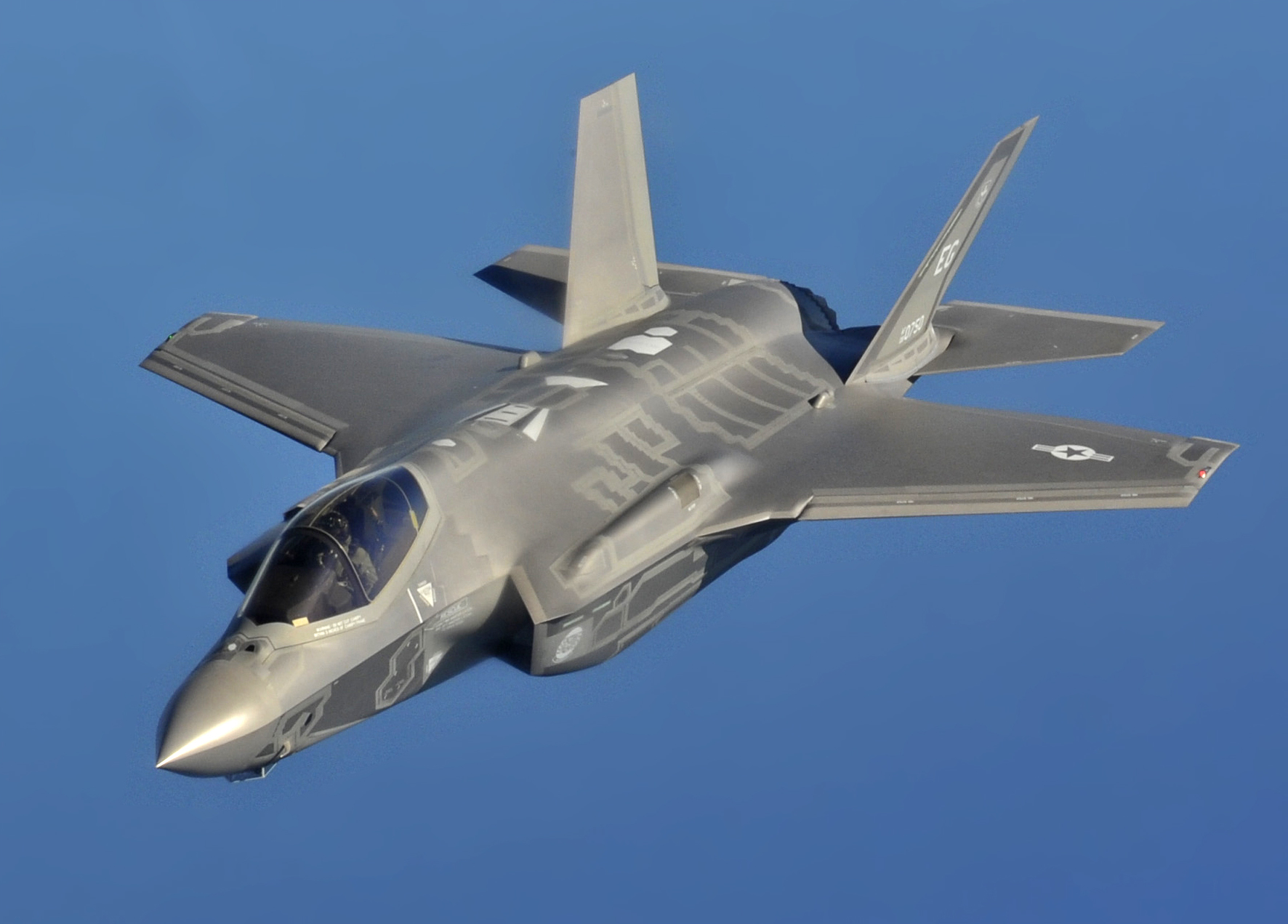
- F-35A Lightning II

General information
- Type: Stealth multirole fighter
- National origin: United States
- Manufacturer: Lockheed Martin Aeronautics
- Status: In service

History
- Introduction date: F-35B: 31 July 2015 (USMC); F-35A: 2 August 2016 (USAF); F-35C: 28 February 2019 (USN)
- First flight: 15 December 2006 (F-35A)
- Developed from: Lockheed Martin X-35

The development of the Lockheed Martin F-35 Lightning II ran from 1995 with the origins of the Joint Strike Fighter program to the completion of operational testing and start of full-rate production in 2021. The X-35 first flew on 24 October 2000 and the F-35A on 15 December 2006.

Intended to replace most US fighter jets, the F-35 was designed with three variants: F-35A (conventional take off and landing, CTOL), F-35B (short-take off and vertical-landing, STOVL), and F-35C (carrier-based catapult assisted take-off (CATOBAR), CV). The variants were intended to share most of their parts and thereby reduce costs and improve maintenance logistics, but by 2017 shared just 20% of their parts.

It was developed with and for foreign partners, unlike the Lockheed Martin F-22 Raptor.

The program received considerable criticism for cost overruns during development and for the total projected cost of the program over the lifetime of the jets. By 2017, the program was expected over its lifetime (until 2070) to cost $406.5 billion for acquisition of the jets and $1.1 trillion for operations and maintenance. A number of design deficiencies were alleged, such as carrying a small internal payload; inferior performance to the aircraft being replaced, particularly the General Dynamics F-16 Fighting Falcon; and the lack of safety in relying on a single engine. Laws included vulnerability of the fuel tank to fire and the propensity for transonic roll-off (TRO or "wing drop"). The possible obsolescence of stealth technology was also criticized.

== JSF program requirements and selection ==
The Joint Strike Fighter program was intended to replace the United States military General Dynamics F-16 Fighting Falcon, Fairchild Republic A-10 Thunderbolt II, McDonnell Douglas F/A-18 Hornet (excluding newer E/F "Super Hornet" variants) and McDonnell Douglas AV-8B Harrier II tactical fighter and attack aircraft. It was also intended to meet requirements through 2035. To do this, Pentagon leaders decided to build a single jet in three variants: F-35A, conventional take off and landing (CTOL); F-35B, short-take off and vertical-landing (STOVL); and F-35C, carrier-based CATOBAR (CV) variant. The approach was meant to reduce development, production, and operating costs. But by April 2017, the variants were sharing just 20% of their parts.

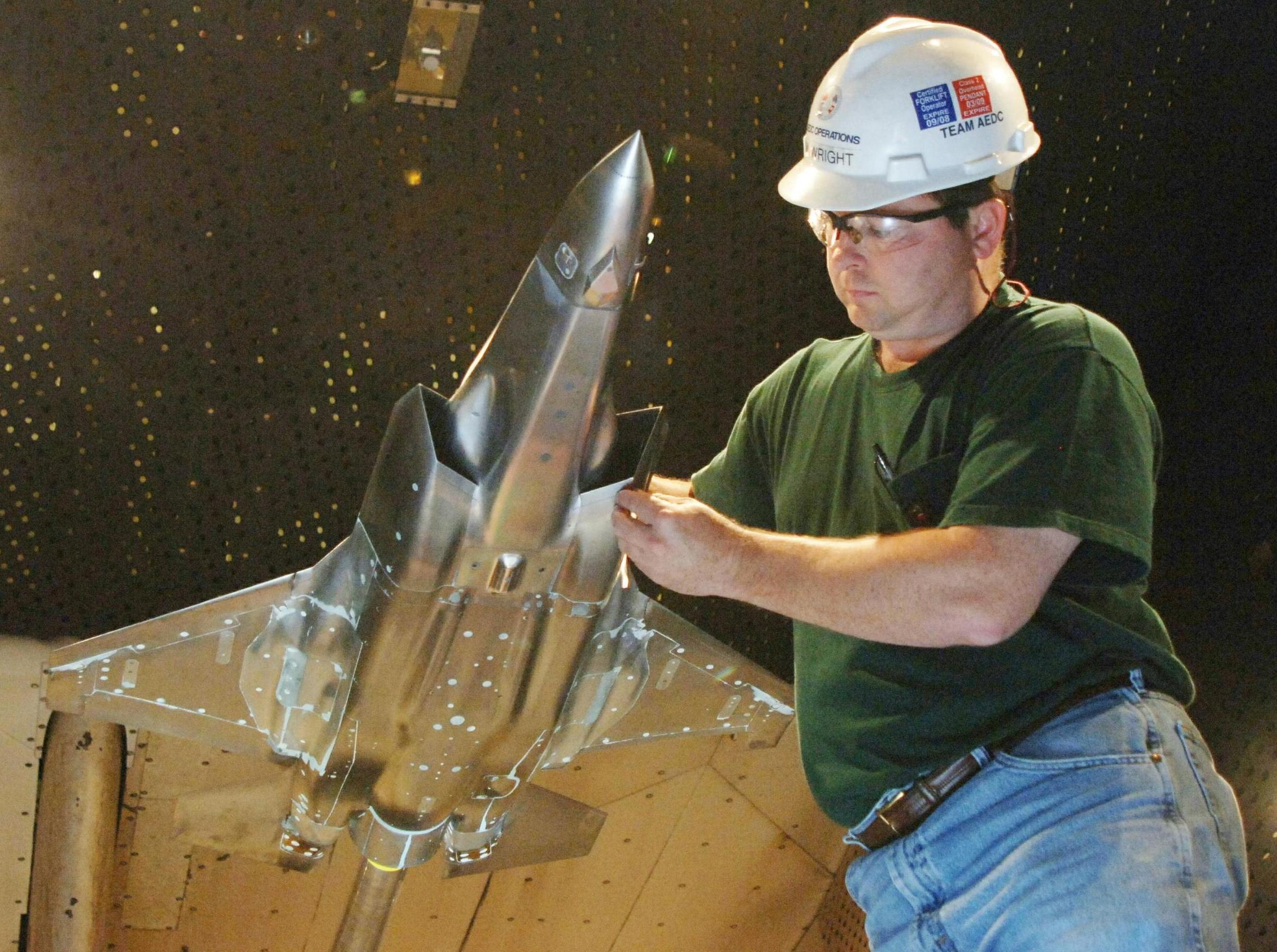
An F-35 wind tunnel testing model in the Arnold Engineering Development Center's 16-foot transonic wind tunnel

The design goals call for the F-35 to be the premier strike aircraft through 2040 and to be second only to the F-22 Raptor in air supremacy. George Standridge, Vice President of Strategy and Business Development for Lockheed Martin Aeronautics, predicted in 2006 that the F-35 would be four times more effective than existing fighters in air-to-air combat, eight times more effective in air-to-ground combat, and three times more effective in reconnaissance and Suppression of Enemy Air Defenses – while having better range and requiring less logistics support and having around the same procurement costs (if development costs are ignored) as legacy fighters.

The JSF development contract was signed on 16 November 1996, and the contract for System Development and Demonstration (SDD) was awarded by the Department of Defense (DoD) on 26 October 2001 to Lockheed Martin, whose X-35 beat the Boeing X-32. Although both aircraft met or exceeded requirements, the X-35 design was considered to have less risk and more growth potential. The designation of the new fighter as "F-35" is out-of-sequence with standard DoD aircraft numbering, by which it should have been "F-24". It came as a surprise even to the company, which had been referring to the aircraft in-house by this expected designation.

The development of the F-35 is unusual for a fighter aircraft in that no two-seat trainer versions have been built for any of the variants; advanced flight simulators mean that no trainer versions were deemed necessary. Instead F-16s have been used as bridge trainers between the T-38 and the F-35. The T-X was intended to be used to train future F-35 pilots, but this might succumb to budget pressures in the USAF.

== Design phase ==
Based on wind tunnel testing, Lockheed Martin slightly enlarged its X-35 design into the F-35. The forward fuselage is 5 inches (130 mm) longer to make room for avionics. Correspondingly, the horizontal stabilators were moved 2 inches (51 mm) rearward to retain balance and control. The top surface of the fuselage was raised by 1 inch (25 mm) along the center line. Also, it was decided to increase the size of the F-35B STOVL variant's weapons bay to be common with the other two variants. Manufacturing of parts for the first F-35 prototype airframe began in November 2003. Because the X-35 did not have weapons bays, their addition in the F-35 would cause design changes which would lead to later weight problems.

The F-35B STOVL variant was in danger of missing performance requirements in 2004 because it weighed too much; reportedly, by 2,200 lb (1,000 kg) or 8%. In response, Lockheed Martin added engine thrust and thinned airframe members, reduced the size of the common weapons bay and vertical stabilizers, rerouted some thrust from the roll-post outlets to the main nozzle, and redesigned the wing-mate joint, portions of the electrical system, and the portion of the aircraft immediately behind the cockpit. Many of the changes were applied to all three variants to maintain high levels of commonality. By September 2004, the weight reduction effort had reduced the aircraft's design weight by 2,700 pounds (1,200 kg), but the redesign cost $6.2 billion and delayed the project by 18 months.

On 7 July 2006, the U.S. Air Force, the lead service for the aircraft, officially announced the name of the F-35: Lightning II, in honor of Lockheed's World War II-era twin-propeller Lockheed P-38 Lightning for the United States Army Air Forces and the Cold War-era jet, the English Electric Lightning for the Royal Air Force. (Note: Quote: "The F-35 Lightning II will carry on the legacy of two of the greatest and most capable fighter aircraft of all time. Just as the P-38 and the British Lightning were at the top of their class during their day, the F-35 will redefine multi-role fighter capability in the 21st century". Ralph D. Heath, president of Lockheed Martin Aeronautics Co.)

Lockheed Martin Aeronautics is the prime contractor and performs aircraft final assembly, overall system integration, mission system, and provides forward fuselage, wings and aircraft flight control system. Northrop Grumman provides active electronically scanned array (AESA) radar, electro-optical AN/AAQ-37 Distributed Aperture System (DAS), Communications, Navigation, Identification (CNI), center fuselage, weapons bay, and arrestor gear. BAE Systems provides the Flight Control Software (FCS1), the electronic warfare systems, crew life support and escape systems, aft fuselage, empennages as well as the horizontal and vertical tails. Alenia will perform final assembly for Italy and, according to an Alenia executive, assembly of all European aircraft with the exception of Turkey and the United Kingdom. The F-35 program has seen a great deal of investment in automated production facilities. For example, Handling Specialty produced the wing assembly platforms for Lockheed Martin.

On 19 December 2008, Lockheed Martin rolled out the first weight-optimized F-35A, designated AF-1. It was the first F-35 built at full production speed, and is structurally identical to the production F-35As that were delivered starting in 2010. On 5 January 2009, six F-35s had been built, including AF-1; another 13 pre-production test aircraft and four production aircraft were being manufactured. On 6 April 2009, U.S. Secretary of Defense Robert Gates proposed speeding up production for the U.S. to buy 2,443 F-35s.

== Program cost overruns and delays ==
=== 2006–2011 ===
The F-35 program has experienced a number of cost overruns and developmental delays. The program's delays have come under fire from the U.S. Congress and some U.S. Department of Defense officials. The program has undergone a number of reassessments and changes since 2006. The Government Accountability Office (GAO) warned in March 2006 that excessive concurrency ("an overlap of flight testing and initial production") might result in expensive refits for several hundred F-35 aircraft that are planned for production before design testing is completed. In 2010, acquisition chief Ashton Carter issued an Acquisition Decision Memorandum restructuring the F-35 program. In November 2010, the GAO found that "Managing an extensive, still-maturing global network of suppliers adds another layer of complexity to producing aircraft efficiently and on-time" and that "due to the extensive amount of testing still to be completed, the program could be required to make alterations to its production processes, changes to its supplier base, and costly retrofits to produced and fielded aircraft, if problems are discovered". USAF budget data in 2010, along with other sources, projected the F-35 to have a flyaway cost from US$89 million to US$200 million over the planned production run. In February 2011, the Pentagon put a price of $207.6 million on each of the 32 aircraft to be acquired in FY2012, rising to $304.16 million (a total acquisition cost of $9.7 billion for 32 aircraft) if its share of research, development, test and evaluation (RDT&E) spending is included.

On 21 April 2009, media reports, citing Pentagon sources, said that during 2007 and 2008, spies downloaded several terabytes of data related to the F-35's design and electronics systems, potentially compromising the aircraft and aiding the development of defense systems against it. Lockheed Martin rejected suggestions that the project was compromised, stating it "does not believe any classified information had been stolen". Other sources suggested that the incident caused both hardware and software redesigns to be more resistant to cyber attack. In March 2012, BAE Systems was reported to be the target of cyber espionage. BAE Systems refused to comment on the report, although they did state, "[Our] own cyber security capability can detect, prevent and rectify such attacks". On 9 November 2009, Ashton Carter, undersecretary of defense for acquisition, technology and logistics, acknowledged that the Pentagon "joint estimate team" (JET) had found possible future cost and schedule overruns in the project and that he would be holding meetings to attempt to avoid these. On 1 February 2010, Gates removed the JSF Program Manager, U.S. Marine Corps Major General David Heinz, and withheld $614 million in payments to Lockheed Martin because of program costs and delays.

On 11 March 2010, a report from the Government Accountability Office to United States Senate Committee on Armed Services projected the overall unit cost of an F-35A to be $113 million in "today's money". In 2010, Pentagon officials disclosed that the F-35 program had exceeded its original cost estimates by more than 50 percent. An internal Pentagon report critical of the JSF project stated that "affordability is no longer embraced as a core pillar". In 2010, Lockheed Martin expected they would be able to reduce costs projected by government estimators by 20 percent. On 24 March 2010, Robert Gates, Secretary of Defense, in testimony before Congress, declared the cost overruns and delays "unacceptable", characterizing previous cost and schedule estimates as "overly rosy". Gates insisted the F-35 would become "the backbone of U.S. air combat for the next generation" and informed Congress that he had extended the development period by an additional 13 months and budgeted $3 billion more for the testing program, while slowing down production. In August 2010, Lockheed Martin announced delays in resolving a "wing-at-mate overlap" production problem, which would slow initial production. In November 2010, as part of a cost-cutting measure, the co-chairs of the National Commission on Fiscal Responsibility and Reform suggested cancelling the F-35B and halving orders for F-35As and F-35Cs. Air Force Magazine reported that "Pentagon officials" were considering canceling the F-35B because its short range meant that the forward bases or amphibious ships from which it would operate would be in range of hostile tactical ballistic missiles. Lockheed Martin consultant Loren B. Thompson said that this ″rumor″ was a result of the usual tensions between the U.S. Navy and Marine Corps, and there was no alternative other than the F-35B as a replacement for AV-8B Harrier II. He also confirmed that there were further delays and cost increases due to technical problems with the aircraft and software, blaming most of the delays and extra costs on redundant flight tests. In November 2010, the Center for Defense Information expected that the F-35 program would be restructured, resulting in an additional year of delay and increasing the cost by another $5 billion. On 5 November 2010, the Block 1 software flew for the first time on BF-4. As of the end of 2010, it was said that only 15% of the software remained to be written, but this was reported to include the most difficult sections such as data fusion. In 2011, it was revealed that actually, only 50% of the estimated eight million lines of code needed had been written and that, according to the newest schedule, it would take another six years to complete the software. By 2012, the total estimated lines of code for the entire program (onboard and offboard) had grown from the previous year's estimate of 8 million lines to 24 million lines.

In 2011, the program head and Commander of the Naval Air Systems Command, Vice Admiral David Venlet, confirmed that the concurrency (testing and production at the same time) built into the program "was a miscalculation". This was said during a contract dispute, in which the Pentagon insisted that Lockheed Martin help cover the costs of applying fixes found during testing of aircraft already produced. Lockheed Martin objected that the cost sharing posed an uninsurable, unbounded risk that the company could not cover, and later responded that the "concurrency costs for F-35 continue to reduce". The Senate Armed Services Committee strongly backed the Pentagon position. However, in December 2011, Lockheed Martin accepted a cost sharing agreement. The Aerospace Industries Association warned that such changes would force them to anticipate cost overruns in the future when bidding on contracts. As of 2012, problems found during flight testing were expected to continue to lead to higher levels of engineering changes through 2019. The total additional cost for concurrency in the program is around $1.3 billion. By the next year the cost had grown to $1.7 billion. In January 2011, Defense Secretary Robert Gates expressed the Pentagon's frustration with the rising costs of the F-35 program when he said, "The culture of endless money that has taken hold must be replaced by a culture of restraint". Focusing his attention on the troubled F-35B, Gates ordered "a two-year probation", saying it "should be canceled" if corrections are unsuccessful. Gates had previously stated his support for the program. Some private analysts had said that the F-35 program was becoming a money pit. Gates' successor, Leon Panetta, ended the F-35B's probation on 20 January 2012, stating "The STOVL variant has made—I believe and all of us believe—sufficient progress". In February 2011, former Pentagon manager Paul G. Kaminski said that the lack of a complete test plan would add five years to the JSF program. Initial operating capability (IOC) will be determined by software development rather than by hardware production or pilot training. As of May 2013, the USMC plans to have Initial Operating Capability by "mid-2015" for the F-35B, using Block 2B software, which gives basic air-to-air and air-to-ground capability. It is reported that the USAF plans to push ahead, expecting to have Initial Operating Capability with the F-35A in mid-2016, using Block 3I software, rather than waiting for the full-capability Block 3F software, which is expected to be available by mid-2017. The F-35C will not enter service with the USN until mid-2018. The $56.4 billion development project for the aircraft should be completed in 2018 when the Block 5 configuration is expected to be delivered, several years late and considerably over budget.

=== 2011–present ===
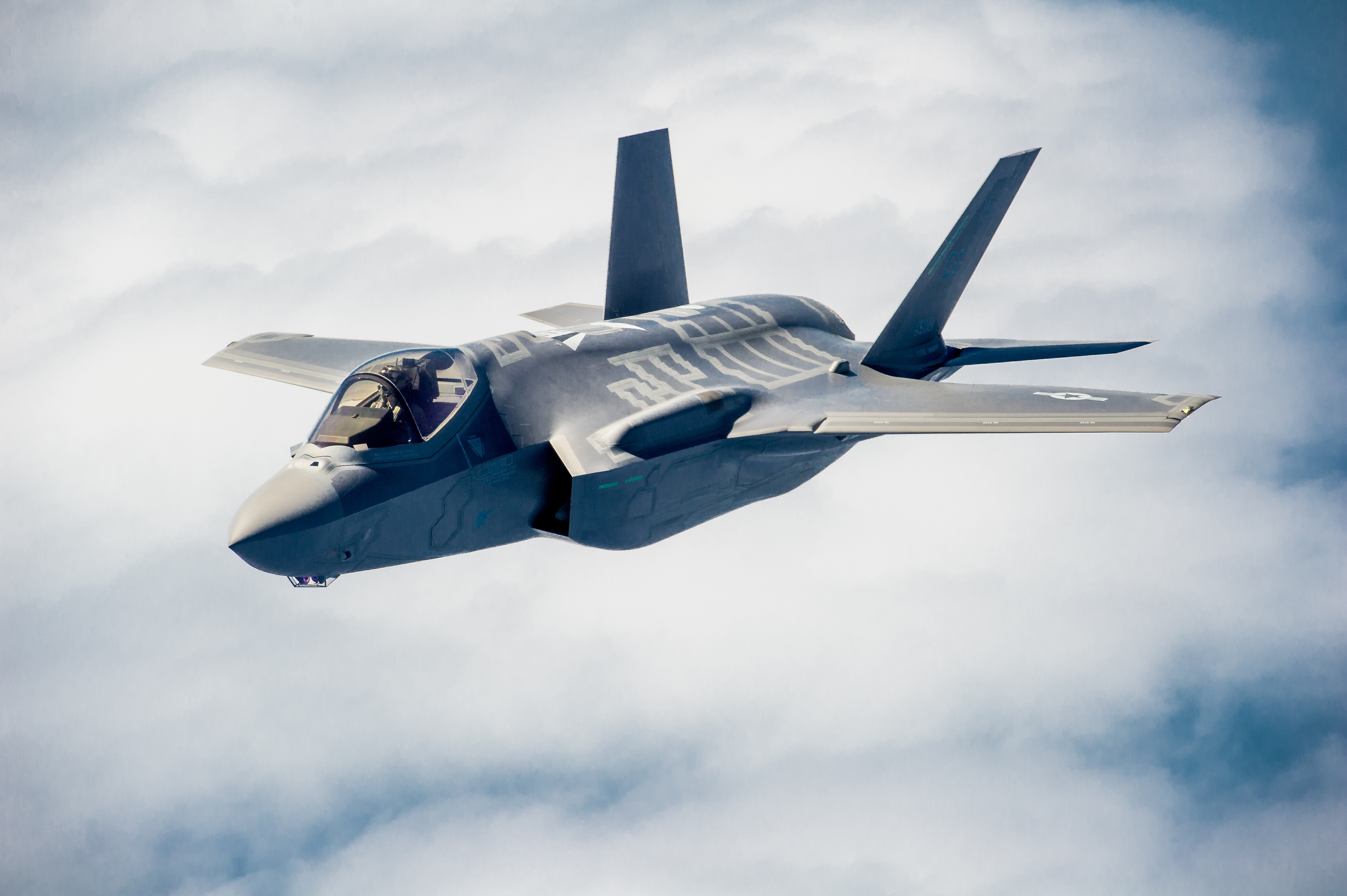
F-35A moving into position to refuel

Delays in the F-35 program may lead to a "fighter gap" with the United States and other countries lacking sufficient fighter aircraft to meet their requirements. Israel may seek to buy second-hand F-15Es, while Australia has considered buying additional F/A-18 Super Hornets in the face of F-35 delays. In May 2011, the Pentagon's top weapons buyer, Ashton Carter, said that the latest price estimate of $133 million per aircraft was not affordable. In 2011, The Economist warned that the F-35 was in danger of slipping into a "death spiral", where increasing per-aircraft costs would lead to cuts in number of aircraft ordered, leading to further cost increases and further cuts in orders. Later that year, four aircraft were cut from the fifth "Low Rate Initial Production (LRIP)" order because of cost overruns. In 2012, a further two aircraft were cut. Lockheed Martin acknowledged that the slowing of purchases would increase costs. David Van Buren, U.S. Air Force acquisition chief, said that Lockheed Martin needed to reduce manufacturing capacity to match the reduced market for their aircraft. However, the company said that the slowdown in American orders would free up capacity, which could be diverted to meet urgent, short-term needs of foreign partners for replacement fighters. Air Force Secretary Michael Donley said that no more money was available and that future price increases would be met with cuts in the number of aircraft ordered. Later that month, the Pentagon reported that costs had risen another 4.3 percent, in part because of production delays. In 2012, the purchase of six out of 31 aircraft was conditioned on progress of development and testing. In 2013, Bogdan repeated that no more money was available, but that he hoped to avoid the death spiral. In 2014 it was reported that another eight aircraft would be cut from the following year's order.

Japan warned that it may halt its purchase of the F-35 if the cost per aircraft increases and Canada has indicated it has not yet committed to purchase the aircraft. The United States is now projected to spend an estimated $323 billion for development and procurement of the F-35, making it the most expensive defense program ever. Testifying before a Canadian parliamentary committee in 2011, Rear Admiral Arne Røksund of Norway estimated that his country's 52 F-35 fighter jets will cost $769 million each over their operational lifetime. In 2012, the total life-cycle cost for the entire U.S. fleet was estimated at US$1.51 trillion over a 50-year life, or $618 million per plane. In hopes of reducing this high lifetime cost, the USAF is considering reducing Lockheed Martin's role in contractor logistics support. The company has responded that the Pentagon's lifetime cost estimate includes future costs beyond its control, such as USAF reorganizations and yet-to-be-specified upgrades. Delays have also negatively affected the program's worldwide supply chain and partner organizations as well.

In 2012, General Norton A. Schwartz decried the "foolishness" of reliance on computer models to arrive at the final design of aircraft before flight testing has found the problems that require changes in design. In 2013, JSF project team leader, USAF Lieutenant General Chris Bogdan, said that "A large amount of concurrency, that is, beginning production long before your design is stable and long before you've found problems in test, creates downstream issues where now you have to go back and retrofit airplanes and make sure the production line has those fixes in them. And that drives complexity and cost". Bogdan remarked on the improvement in the program ever since Lockheed Martin was forced to assume some of the financial risks. In 2012, in order to avoid further delays that would result from design changes, the U.S. DoD accepted a reduced combat radius for the F-35A and a longer takeoff run for the F-35B. As a result, the F-35B's estimated combat radius was reduced by 15 percent. In a meeting in Sydney, Australia in March 2012, the United States pledged to eight partner nations that there would be no more program delays. In May 2012, Lockheed Martin Chief Executive Bob Stevens complained that the Defense Department's requirements for cost data were themselves driving up program costs. Stevens also said that a strike by union employees might result in failure to meet that year's production target of 29 F-35s. Striking workers questioned the quality of work done by temporary replacements, noting that even their own work had been cited for "inattention to production quality", resulting in a 16% rework rate. The workers went on strike to protect pensions, the cost of which had been the subject of negotiations with the Department of Defense over orders for the next batch of aircraft. These same pension costs were cited by Fitch in their downgrade of the outlook for Lockheed Martin's stock price. Stevens said that while he hoped to bring down program costs, the industrial base was not capable of meeting the government's cost expectations, given the current number of aircraft on order.

According to a June 2012 Government Accountability Office report, the F-35's unit cost had almost doubled, with an increase of 93% over the program's original, 2001 baseline cost estimates. In 2012, Lockheed Martin reportedly feared that the tighter policies of the Obama administration regarding award fees would reduce their profits by $500 million over the coming five years. This in fact occurred in 2012, when the Pentagon withheld the maximum $47 million allowed, for the company's failure to certify its program for tracking project costs and schedules. The GAO also faulted the USAF and USN for not fully planning for the costs of extending legacy F-16 and F-18 fleets to cover the delay in acquiring the F-35. Because of cost-cutting measures, the U.S. Government asserts that the "flyaway" cost (including engines) has been dropping. The U.S. Government estimates that in 2020 an "F-35 will cost some $85m each, or less than half of the cost of the initial units delivered in 2009. Adjusted to today’s dollars, the 2020 price would be $75m each".

In 2013, Lockheed Martin began to lay off workers at the Fort Worth, Texas plant where the F-35s were being assembled. They said that revised estimates indicated that the costs of refitting the 187 aircraft built by the time testing concludes in 2016 would be lower than feared. The GAO's Michael Sullivan said that the company had failed to get an early start on systems engineering and had not understood the requirements or the technologies involved at the program's start. The Pentagon vowed to continue funding the program during budget sequestration if possible. It was feared that the U.S. budget sequestration in 2013 could slow development of critical software and the Congress ordered another study to be made on the software development delays. As of 2014, software development remained the "number one technical challenge" for the F-35. In June 2013, Frank Kendall, Pentagon acquisition, technology and logistics chief, declared "major advances" had been made in the F-35 program over the last three years and that he intended to approve production-rate increases in September. Air Force Lt. Gen. Christopher Bogdan, program executive officer, reported far better communications between government and vendor managers, and that negotiations over Lot 6 and 7 talks were moving fast. It was also stated that operating costs had been better understood since training started. He predicted "we can make a substantial dent in projections" of operating costs. In July 2013, further doubt was cast on the latest production schedule, with further software delays and continuing sensor, display and wing buffet problems. In August it was revealed that the Pentagon was weighing cancellation of the program as one possible response to the budget sequestration and the United States Senate Appropriations Subcommittee on Defense voted to cut advance procurement for the fighter.

On August 21, 2013, C-Span reported that Congressional Quarterly and the Government Accountability Office were indicating the "total estimated program cost now is $400 billion, nearly twice the initial cost". The current investment was documented as approximately $50 billion. The projected $316 billion cost in development and procurement was estimated through 2037 at an average of $12.6 billion per year. These were confirmed by Steve O'Bryan, Vice President of Lockheed Martin, on the same date. In 2013, a RAND study found that during development, the three different versions had drifted so far apart from each other, that having a single base design might have come to be more expensive than if the three services had simply built entirely different aircraft, each tailored to their own requirements. On 10 April 2017 Bloomberg Businessweek reported that the total expenditures for the F-35 program would approach $1 trillion.

In 2014, the airframe cost went below $100 million for the first time, and the Air Force expected unit costs to fall. A 2014 Center for International Policy study cast doubt on the number of indirect jobs created by the program, which has been a key selling point for the F-35 to Congress. Lockheed stood by their job numbers and said that their accounting was in line with industry norms. A January 2014 report by J. Michael Gilmore said that new software delays could delay Block 2B release by 13 months. This estimate was reduced to 4 months in the DOTE report from November 2014. The F-35 program office considered software to be the top technical risk to the program. The USMC was maintaining their expectation of an Initial Operational Capability by July 2015. In 2014, U.S. Senator John McCain blamed cost increases in the program on "cronyism". In 2014, the GAO found that the F-35 fleet would have operating costs 79% higher than the aircraft it was to replace. In 2014, the FY2015 Selected Acquisition Report stated that the program cost had increased 43% from 2001, with Program Acquisition Unit Cost up 68% and Unit Recurring Flyaway up 41%. The F-35A's cost per flying hour in BY2012 dollars is $32,500 while the F-16C/D is $25,500, but each F-35A is expected to fly only 250 hours a year, compared to the F-16's 316 hours a year, resulting in the same yearly operating cost. In July 2014, Lockheed Martin, Northrop Grumman, and BAE Systems announced they would invest a combined $170 million in the program, which was anticipated to result in savings of over $10 million per aircraft. This initiative was said to have set the project on track for an $80M (including engine) price tag per aircraft (F-35A) by 2018, when full production is scheduled to begin. The December 2014 Selected Acquisition Report listed a cost decrease of $7.5 billion against a program cost of $391.1 billion ($320 billion in 2012 dollars). Lockheed Martin also stated that there would be an estimated decrease of nearly $60 billion to the operations and support costs.

In December 2015, the FY2017 Selected Acquisition Report had revised the F-35A's cost per flying hour in BY2012 dollars to $29,806, in comparison with the F-16C/D's antecedent of $25,541, also in BY2012 dollars. This was a result of a decrease in the assumed cost per gallon of JP-8 fuel, a decrease in the fuel burn rate for the F-35A variant and a revised cost estimating relationship for hardware modifications. The 2015 DoD annual report stated that the current schedule to complete System Development and Demonstration (SDD) and enter Initial Operational Testing and Evaluation (IOT&E) by August 2017 was unrealistic, instead the program would likely not finish Block 3F development and flight testing prior to January 2018. Based on those projected completion dates for Block 3F developmental testing, IOT&E would not start earlier than August 2018.

The Block 3I software was intended to be a revision of the Block 2B software to run on the updated Integrated Core Processor. Unfortunately, it resulted in a timing misalignment that reduced stability, requiring reboots in flight. By May 2016 the software had been improved to the point where it only crashed every 15 hours. Reboots were required over a third of the time for ground cold starts. The following month saw 88 successful sorties untroubled by the stability bug.

== Concerns over performance and safety ==
A Lockheed Martin press release points to USAF simulations regarding the F-35's air-to-air performance against adversaries described as "4th generation" fighters, in which it states the F-35 is "400 percent" more effective. Major General Charles R. Davis, USAF, the F-35 program executive officer, has stated that the "F-35 enjoys a significant Combat Loss Exchange Ratio advantage over the current and future air-to-air threats, to include Sukhois".

In September 2008, in reference to the original plan to fit the F-35 with only two air-to-air missiles (internally), Major Richard Koch, chief of USAF Air Combat Command's advanced air dominance branch is reported to have said that "I wake up in a cold sweat at the thought of the F-35 going in with only two air-dominance weapons". The Norwegians have been briefed on a plan to equip the F-35 with six AIM-120D missiles by 2019. Former RAND author John Stillion has written of the F-35A's air-to-air combat performance that it "can't turn, can't climb, can't run"; Lockheed Martin test pilot Jon Beesley has stated that in an air-to-air configuration the F-35 has almost as much thrust as weight and a flight control system that allows it to be fully maneuverable even at a 50-degree angle of attack. Consultant to Lockheed Martin Loren B. Thompson has said that the "electronic edge F-35 enjoys over every other tactical aircraft in the world may prove to be more important in future missions than maneuverability".

A senior U.S. defense official was quoted as saying that the F-35 will be "the most stealthy, sophisticated and lethal tactical fighter in the sky", and added "Quite simply, the F-15 will be no match for the F-35". After piloting the aircraft, RAF Squadron Leader Steve Long said that, over its existing aircraft, the F-35 will give "the RAF and Navy a quantum leap in airborne capability".

In November 2009, Jon Schreiber, head of F-35 international affairs program for the Pentagon, said that the U.S. will not share the software code for the F-35 with its allies. The US plans to set up a reprogramming facility that will develop JSF software and distribute it to allies. In 2014 in order to deal with capacity issues in the creation of mission data packages at the Air Combat Command reprogramming lab at Eglin Air Force Base, Fla., plans were announced to open additional mission data labs to customize mission data packages with terrain and enemy threat information for different regions and partner nation needs. DARPA is working on the Adaptive Radar Countermeasures (ARC) project to provide protection in real time for previously unknown threat radars.

In 2011, Canadian politicians raised the issue of the safety of the F-35's reliance on a single engine (as opposed to a twin-engine configuration, which provides a backup in case of an engine failure). Canada, and other operators, had previous experience with a high accident rate with the single-engine Lockheed CF-104 Starfighter with many accidents related to engine failures. When asked what would happen if the F-35's single engine fails in the far north, Defence Minister Peter MacKay stated "It won’t".

In November 2011, a Pentagon study team identified 13 areas of concern that remained to be addressed in the F-35.

In May 2012, Michael Auslin of the American Enterprise Institute questioned the capability of the F-35 to engage modern air defenses. In July 2012, the Pentagon awarded Lockheed Martin $450 million to improve the F-35 electronic warfare systems and incorporate Israeli systems.

In a negative assessment of the Joint Strike Fighter, the think tank Air Power Australia declared that the Joint Strike Fighter is not designed to perform air superiority roles and also is not adapted to performing the long-range penetration strike role filled by previous Australian aircraft like the General Dynamics F-111C. Critically, they also stated that the F-35's "intended survivability and lethality are mismatched against the operational environment in which the aircraft is intended to be used".

In June 2012, Australia's Air Vice Marshal Osley responded to Air Power Australia's criticisms by saying "Air Power Australia (Kopp and Goon) claim that the F-35 will not be competitive in 2020 and that Air Power Australia's criticisms mainly center around F-35's aerodynamic performance and stealth capabilities". Osley continued, "these are inconsistent with years of detailed analysis that has been undertaken by Defence, the JSF program office, Lockheed Martin, the U.S. services and the eight other partner nations. While aircraft developments, such as the Sukhoi Su-57 or the Chengdu J-20, as argued by Airpower Australia, show that threats we could potentially face are becoming increasingly sophisticated, there is nothing new regarding development of these aircraft to change Defence's assessment". He then said that he thinks that the Air Power Australia's "analysis is basically flawed through incorrect assumptions and a lack of knowledge of the classified F-35 performance information".

A report released in 2013 stated that flaws in the fuel tank and fueldraulic (fuel-based hydraulic) systems have left it considerably more vulnerable to lightning strikes and other fire sources, including enemy fire, than previously revealed, especially at lower altitudes. The restriction on blue skies flights was subsequently removed in 2015. This report updated a separate report from 2010, in which Lockheed Martin spokesman John Kent said that adding fire-suppression systems would offer "very small" improvement to survivability. The same 2010 report also noted performance degradation of the three variants; the sustained turn rates had been reduced to 4.6 g for the F-35A, 4.5 g for the F-35B, and 5.0 g for the F-35C. The acceleration performance of all three variants was also downgraded, with the F-35C taking 43 seconds longer than an F-16 to accelerate from Mach 0.8 to Mach 1.2; this was judged by several fighter pilots to be a lower performance level than expected from a fourth generation fighter. On 30 August 2013, it was reported that the F-35B and F-35C models take several complex maneuvers in order to "accelerate" to their top speed of Mach 1.6, which consumed almost all of the onboard fuel. The F-35 program office is reconsidering addition of previously removed safety equipment. In 2012, Lockheed Martin program manager Tom Burbage said that while the relatively large cross-sectional area of the fighter that was required by the internal weapons bays gave it a disadvantage against fourth generation fighters that were operating in a clean configuration, the F-35 armed with weapons carried internally had the advantage over fighters carrying their weapons outside the aircraft.

In March 2013, USAF test pilots, flying with pre-operational software that did not utilize the all-aspect infrared AAQ-37 DAS sensor, noted a lack of visibility from the F-35 cockpit during evaluation flights, which would get them consistently shot down in combat. Defense spending analyst Winslow Wheeler concluded from flight evaluation reports that the F-35A "is flawed beyond redemption"; in response, program manager Bogdan suggested that pilots worried about being shot down should fly cargo aircraft instead. The same report found (in addition to the usual problems with the aircraft listed above):

- Current aircraft software is inadequate for even basic pilot training.
- Ejection seat may fail, causing pilot fatality.
- Several pilot-vehicle interface issues, including lack of feedback on touchscreen controls.
- The radar performs poorly, or not at all.
- Engine replacement takes an average of 52 hours, instead of the two hours specified.
- Maintenance tools do not work.

The JPO responded that more experienced pilots would be able to safely operate the aircraft and that procedures would improve over time.

Even in the final "3F" software version, the F-35 will lack ROVER, in spite of having close air support as one of its primary missions.

In 2014, David Axe stated design flaws related to its single-engine configuration could vex the F-35 for decades to come, forcing the Pentagon to suspend flying too often for the majority of its fighter fleet.

In November 2014, China unveiled the portable JY-26 Skywatch-U UHF 3-D long-range surveillance radar system, specifically designed to defeat stealth aircraft like the F-35. Responding to a reporter's question about the High-Frequency radar threat General Welsh said "while we may have a new radar developed that allows an acquisition radar to see an airplane, that doesn't mean you can pass the track off to a radar that will then guide a weapon to be able to destroy the airplane. As long as we break the kill chain sometime between when you arrive in the battle space and when the enemy weapon approaches your airplane, you're successful at using stealth".

A 2014 Pentagon report found these issues:

- First two mission data sets available November 2015, after USMC IOC.
- Overall operational suitability relies heavily on contractor support and unacceptable workarounds.
- Aircraft availability reached 51% but short of 60% goal.
- Fuel Tanks don't retain inerting for required 12 hours after landing.
- High dynamic loads on the rudder at lower altitudes in 20–26 AoA preventing testing.
- 82 pounds added to F-35B in last 38 months, 337 pounds below limit.
- Transonic Roll-Off (TRO) and airframe buffet continue to be program concerns.
- 572 deficiencies remain affecting Block 2B capability, 151 of which are critical.
- VSim would likely not support planned Block 2B operational testing in 2015.
- Maintainability hours still an issue.
- ALIS requires many manual workarounds.

A 2015 Pentagon report found these issues:

- The Joint Program Office is re-categorizing or failing to count aircraft failures to try to boost maintainability and reliability statistics;
- Testing is continuing to reveal the need for more tests, but the majority of the fixes and for capability deficiencies being discovered are being deferred to later blocks rather than being resolved;
- The F-35 has a significant risk of fire due to extensive fuel tank vulnerability, lightning vulnerability, and its OBIGGS system's inability to sufficiently reduce fire-sustaining oxygen, despite redesigns;
- Wing drop concerns are still not resolved after six years, and may only be mitigated or solved at the expense of combat maneuverability and stealth;
- The June engine problems are seriously impeding or preventing the completion of key test points, including ensuring that the F-35B delivered to the Marine Corps for IOC meets critical safety requirements; no redesign, schedule, or cost estimate for a long-term fix has been defined yet, thereby further impeding g testing;
- Even in its third iteration, the F-35's helmet continues to show high false-alarm rates and computer stability concerns, seriously reducing pilots’ situational awareness and endangering their lives in combat;
- The number of Block 2B's already limited combat capabilities being deferred to later blocks means that the Marine Corps’ FY2015 IOC squadron will be even less combat capable than originally planned;
- ALIS software failures continue to impede operation, mission planning, and maintenance of the F-35, forcing the Services to be overly reliant on contractors and "unacceptable workarounds";
- Deficiencies in Block 2B software, and deferring those capabilities to later blocks, is undermining combat suitability for all three variants of the F-35;
- The program's attempts to save money now by reducing test points and deferring crucial combat capabilities will result in costly retrofits and fixes later down the line, creating a future unaffordable bow wave that, based on F-22 experience, will add at least an additional $67 billion in acquisition costs; and
- Low availability and reliability of the F-35 is driven by inherent design problems that are only becoming more obvious and difficult to fix.

Three different types of data "massaging" are identified in the DOT&E report: moving failures from one category to another, less important one; ignoring repetitive failures, thus inflating numbers of failure-free hours; and improper scoring of reliability. Maintenance problems were determined to be so severe that the F-35 is only able to fly twice a week. To address the issue of wing drop and buffet maneuvering, the required control law modifications will reduce the maneuverability of the F-35, "only exacerbating the plane’s performance problems in this area". The F-35C's wing drop problem is "worse than other variants". Testing to investigate the impact of buffet and transonic roll-off (TRO or "wing drop") on the helmet-mounted display and offensive and defensive maneuvering found that "buffet affected display symbology, and would have the greatest impact in scenarios where a pilot was maneuvering to defeat a missile shot". Buffeting also degrades the gyroscopes in the inertial platforms which are essential for flight control, navigation, and weapons aiming. DOT&E explained that this was an ongoing issue: "In heavy buffet conditions, which occur between 20 and 26 degrees angle of attack, faults occurred in the inertial measurement units (IMUs) in the aircraft that degraded the flight control system (two of three flight control channels become disabled), requiring a flight abort".

In early 2015 the AF-2 F-35A, the primary flight sciences loads and flutter evaluation aircraft, was flown by Lockheed Martin F-35 site lead test pilot David "Doc" Nelson in air-to-air combat maneuvers against F-16s for the first time and, based on the results of these and earlier flight-envelope evaluations, said the aircraft can be cleared for greater agility as a growth option. AF-2 was the first F-35 to be flown to 9g+ and −3g, and to roll at design-load factor. Departure/spin resistance was also proven during high angle-of-attack (AOA) testing which eventually went as high as 110 deg. AOA. "When we did the first dogfight in January, they said, ‘you have no limits,’" says Nelson. "It was loads monitoring, so they could tell if we ever broke something. It was a confidence builder for the rest of the fleet because there is no real difference structurally between AF-2 and the rest of the airplanes". "Pilots really like maneuverability, and the fact that the aircraft recovers so well from a departure allows us to say [to the designers of the flight control system laws], ‘you don’t have to clamp down so tight,’" says Nelson.

With the full flight envelope now opened to an altitude of 50,000 ft, speeds of Mach 1.6/700 KCAS and loads of 9 g, test pilots also say improvements to the flight control system have rendered the transonic roll-off (TRO) issue tactically irrelevant. Highlighted as a "program concern" in the Defense Department's Director of Operational Test and Evaluation (DOT&E) 2014 report, initial flight tests showed that all three F-35 variants experienced some form of wing drop in high-speed turns associated with asymmetrical movements of shock waves. However, TRO "has evolved into a non-factor", says Nelson, who likens the effect to a momentary "tug" on one shoulder harness. "You have to pull high-g to even find it". The roll-off phenomena exhibits itself as "less than 10 deg./sec. for a fraction of a second. We have been looking for a task it affects and we can’t find one".

In July 2015, Lockheed Martin confirmed the authenticity of a leaked report showing the F-35 to be less maneuverable than an older F-16D with wing tanks. The pilot who flew the mission reported inferior energy maneuverability, a limited pitch rate and flying qualities that were "not intuitive or favorable" in a major part of the air-combat regime gave the F-16 the tactical advantage. In general the high AoA capabilities of the jet could not be used in an effective way without significantly reducing follow-on maneuvering potential. In an interview with CBC Radio broadcast 2 July 2015, military journalist David Axe claimed to have read the leaked report and stated: "Against a determined foe, the F-35 is in very big trouble". However, the F-35 used was a flight test aircraft with a restricted flight envelope and lacked some features present on the operational aircraft. The Pentagon, JPO, and defense analysts have defended the F-35's utility in spite of the report's assertion that it lacks maneuverability by saying it was designed primarily to disrupt the kill chain of advanced air defenses while the F-22 would handle close-in dogfighting, it has advanced sensor and information fusion capabilities to detect and engage enemy aircraft at long ranges before it can be seen and merged with, and that most air combat in recent decades has focused on sensors and weapons that achieved long-range kills rather than close combat.

The report's conclusions and recommendations noted loads remained below limits, implying there may be more maneuverability available to the airframe. There were five recommendations: increase pitch rate and available Nz (Normal Acceleration g) to provide the pilot with more maneuverability options given the inherent energy deficit; consider increasing alpha onset to also help offset the energy maneuverability deficit; consider increasing the beginning of the high AoA blended region to 30 degrees or greater to make high AoA maneuvering more predictable and intuitive; consider increasing pilot yaw rate to remove the gradual sluggish yaw response; and improve HMD Boresight performance to account for dynamic maneuvers and consider improving rearward visibility by creating more space for helmet motion.

On 14 April 2016 the Government Accountability Office (GAO) released a report on the $16.7 billion Autonomic Logistics Information System (ALIS) expressing concerns that a failure in the logistics system, which serves as the "brains" of the F-35, could ground the entire fleet because it lacked a back-up for processing data. ALIS supports everything from the plane's operations, pilot scheduling, mission planning and supply chain management to maintenance; it is therefore one of the three major components of the jet, along with the airframe and engine. GAO said one of the biggest concerns raised by 120 F-35 pilots, maintenance staff, contractors and program officials interviewed for the report was the lack of a redundant system for processing ALIS data. GAO noted "DOD is aware of risks that could affect ALIS but does not have a plan to prioritize and address them in a holistic manner to ensure that ALIS is fully functional as the F-35 program approaches key milestones – including Air Force and Navy initial operational capability declarations in 2016 and 2018, respectively, and the start of the program’s full-rate production in 2019". A Pentagon-commissioned study from 2013 concluded that any delays or problems with ALIS could add $20 billion to the F-35 program cost. In a 2019 report, the DOT&E found that data provided by ALIS is often incorrect, leading to fighters being erroneously categorized as non-mission capable.

In May 2016, Flightglobal reported that new Block 3i software was finally installed, improving reliability over earlier Block 3 software. With early Block 3 software, it was reported that aircraft had to be shut down and rebooted or a sensor or radar reset "every 4 hours", which was considered an "unacceptable" rate. According to Flightglobal, "F-35 programme director Lt Gen Christopher Bogdan told Congress...that a failure rate of once every 8-10h or greater would be more acceptable, and recent fixes now seem to have achieved that goal".

== Pentagon−Lockheed Martin relation issues ==
In September 2012, the Pentagon criticized, quite publicly, Lockheed Martin's performance on the F-35 program and stated that it would not bail out the program again if problems with the plane's systems, particularly the helmet-mounted display, were not resolved. The deputy F-35 program manager said that the government's relationship with the company was the "worst I've ever seen" in many years of working on complex acquisition programs. Air Force Secretary Michael Donley told reporters the Pentagon had no more money to pour into the program after three costly restructurings in recent years. He said the department was done with major restructuring and that there was no further flexibility or tolerance for that approach. This criticism followed a "very painful" 7 September review that focused on an array of ongoing program challenges. Lockheed Martin responded with a brief statement saying it would continue to work with the F-35 program office to deliver the new fighter.

On 28 September 2012, the Pentagon announced that the F-35 Joint Strike Fighter support program would become an open competition. They invited companies to participate in a two-day forum on 14–15 November for possible opportunities to compete for work managing the supply chain of the aircraft. Their reason is to reduce F-35 life-cycle costs by creating competition within the program and to refine its acquisition strategy and evaluate alternatives that will deliver the best value, long-term F-35 sustainment solution. This could be hazardous to Lockheed Martin, the current prime contractor for sustainment of all three variants, and selection of another company could reduce their revenues.

In 2013, the officer in charge of the program blamed Lockheed Martin and Pratt & Whitney for gouging the government on costs, instead of focusing on the long-term future of the program.

In 2014, Lockheed was reported to be having problems with build quality, including one aircraft with a valve installed backwards and another with gaps in the stealth coating.

== Upgrades ==
In 2012 Lockheed Martin's development roadmap extended until 2021, and included a Block 6 engine improvement in 2019. The aircraft are expected to be upgraded throughout their operational lives.

In September 2013, Northrop Grumman revealed the development of a company-funded Directional Infrared Counter Measures system in anticipation of a requirement to protect the F-35 from heat-seeking missiles. A laser jammer is expected to be part of the F-35 Block 5 upgrade; it must meet low-observability (LO) requirements and fit in the F-35's restricted space. Called the Threat Nullification Defensive Resource (ThNDR), it is to have a small, powerful laser, beam steering and LO window, use liquid cooling, and fit alongside the distributed aperture system (DAS) to provide spherical coverage with minimal changes; the DAS would provide missile warning and cue the jam head.

Combat capabilities of the F-35 are made possible through software increments to advance technical abilities. Block 2A software enhanced simulated weapons, data link capabilities, and early fused sensor integration. Block 2B software enables the F-35 to provide basic close air support with certain JDAMs and the 500 lb GBU-12 Paveway II, as well as fire the AIM-120 AMRAAM. The Air Force is to declare the F-35 initially operational with Block 3i software. Full operational capability will come from Block 3F software; Block 3F enhances its ability to suppress enemy air defenses and enables the Lightning II to deploy the 500 lb JDAM, the GBU-53/B SDB II, and the AIM-9X Sidewinder. Block 4 software will increase the weapons envelope of the F-35 and is made to counter air defenses envisioned to be encountered past the 2040s. Block 4 upgrades will be broken into two increments; Block 4A in 2021 and Block 4B in 2023. This phase will also include usage of weaponry unique to British and other European countries who will operate Lightning II.

Lockheed has offered the potential of "Higher Definition Video, longer range target detection and identification, Video Data Link, and Infrared (IR) Marker and Pointer" for the EOTS in future upgrades.

The contract for follow-on modernization work (after Block 4) is expected to be awarded in late 2018, with a new block upgrade every two years thereafter as threats evolve. These will alternate hardware and software upgrades, with each refreshed once every four years.

In 2016 Robert Weiss, executive vice president of Lockheed Martin Aeronautics, said that buying more F-35s now would make it cheaper to apply planned upgrades to the entire fleet later.
