= United States Army Test and Evaluation Command =

U.S. Army direct reporting unit

U.S. Army Test and Evaluation Command
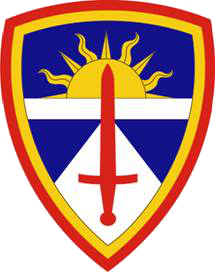
- ATEC shoulder sleeve insignia
- Active: 1 October 1999 – present
- Country: United States
- Branch: United States Army
- Role: Testing and evaluation
- Part of: U.S. Army Transformation and Training Command
- Garrison/HQ: Aberdeen Proving Ground, Maryland
- Motto: Truth in Testing
- Website: atec.army.mil army.mil/atec

Commanders
- Commanding general: MG Patrick L. Gaydon

Insignia
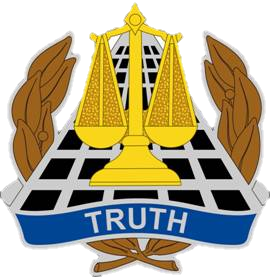
- Distinctive unit insignia

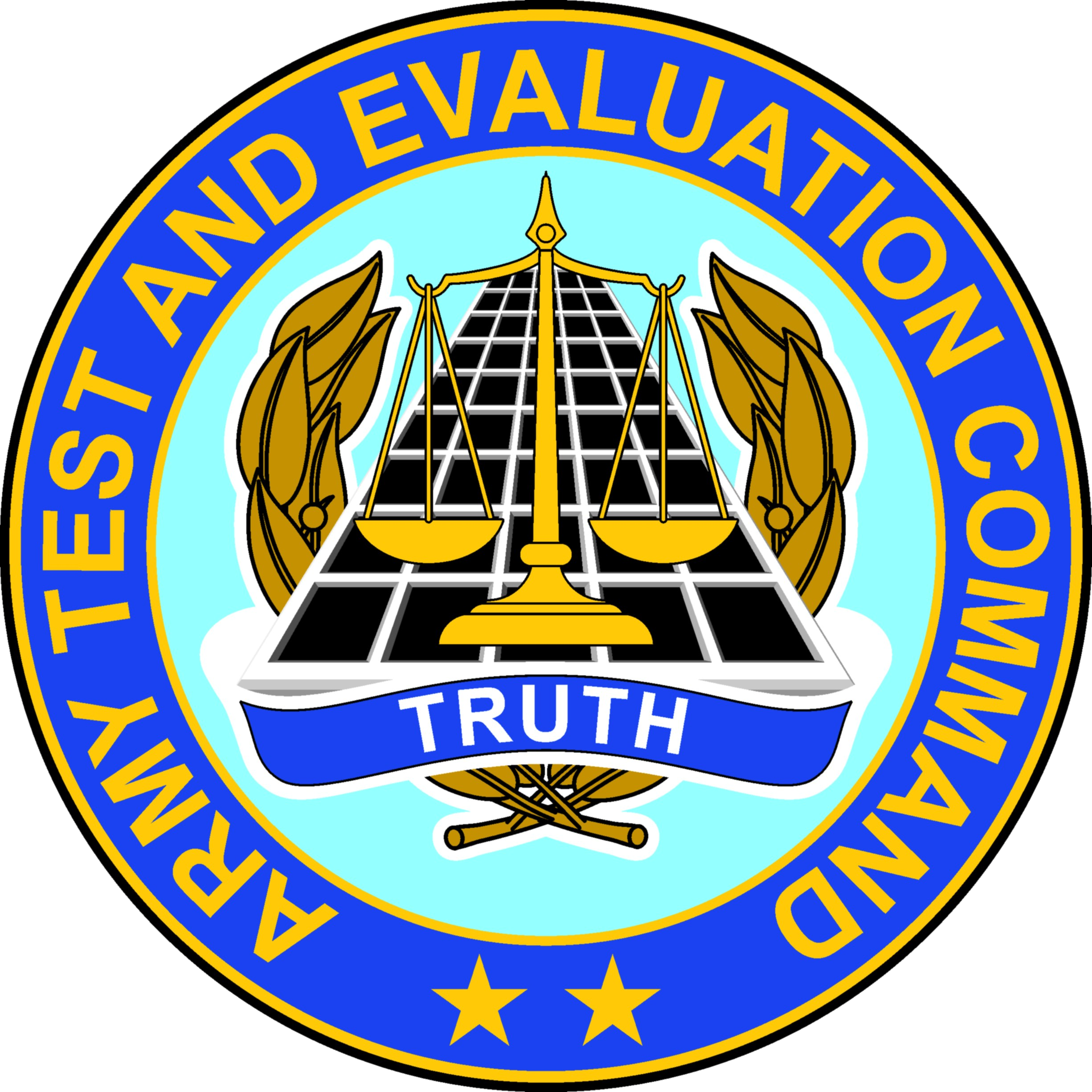
- ATEC seal

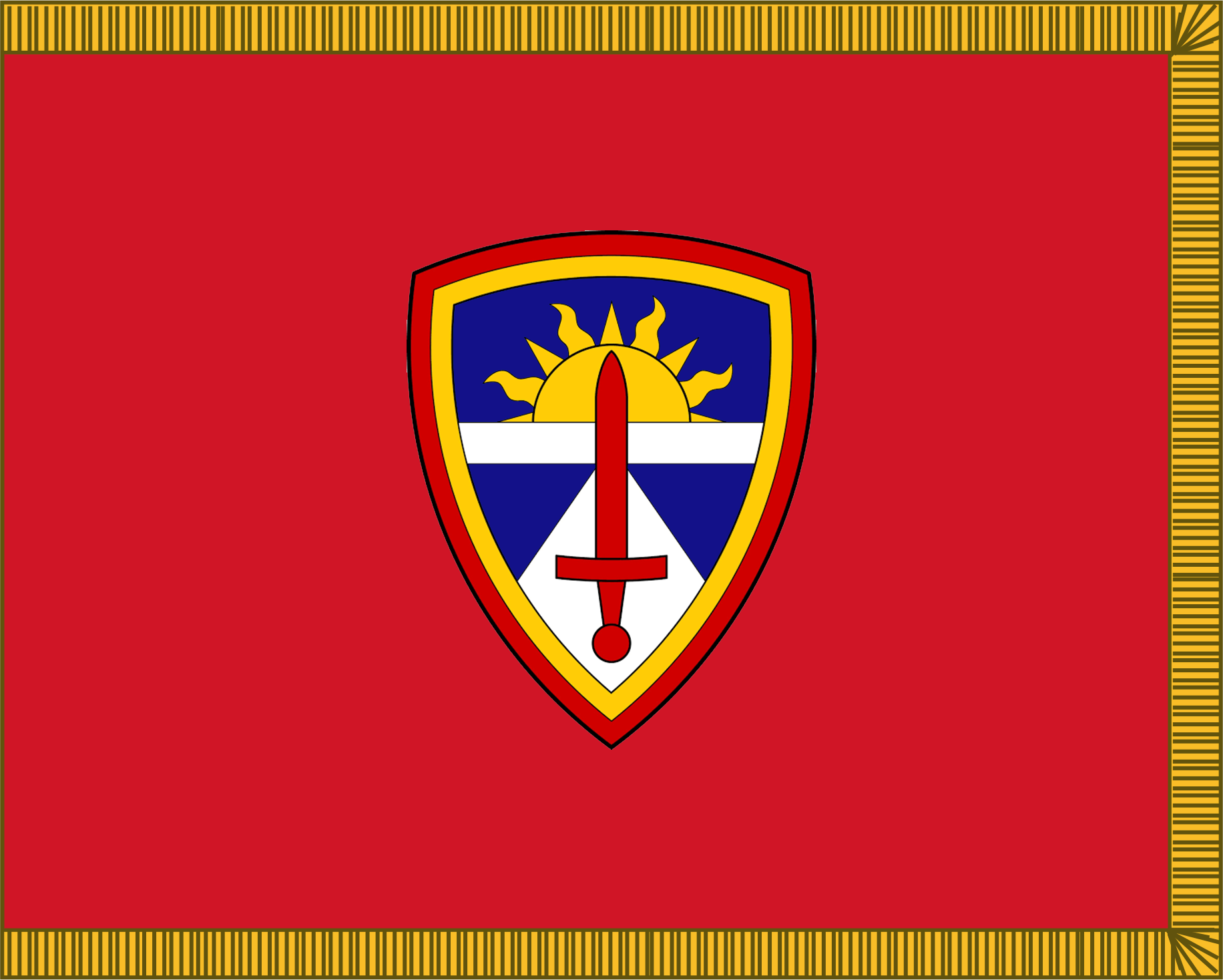
- US Army Test and Evaluation Command Flag

The United States Army Test and Evaluation Command (ATEC) is a unit of the United States Army, responsible for independent tests, evaluations, and experiments on Army equipment.

ATEC informs Army senior leaders on testing and evaluation activities. These activities help Army leadership make acquisition and fielding decisions.

ATEC is a subordinate command of the U.S. Army Transformation and Training Command and is headquartered at Aberdeen Proving Ground, Maryland, with various test and evaluation centers/facilities located across the US and select overseas locations.

== History ==
On 18 November 1998, the consolidation of existing Army (developmental and operational) testing commands was approved by the vice chief of staff of the Army (VCSA).

The Operational Test and Evaluation Command (OPTEC) was redesignated as the Army Test and Evaluation Command (ATEC) on 1 October 1999.

All major subordinate commands of OPTEC were similarly redesignated:

- U.S. Army Test and Evaluation Command (TECOM) became the U.S. Army Developmental Test Command (DTC), Alexandria, Virginia.
- U.S. Army Test and Experimentation Command (TEXCOM) was redesignated U.S. Army Operational Test Command (OTC), at Fort Hood, Texas.
- The Operational Evaluation Command and the Evaluation Analysis Center combined, forming the U.S. Army Evaluation Center (AEC), located at Aberdeen Proving Ground, Maryland.

In November 2011, the U.S. Army Development Test Command was inactivated, and its facilities and people were merged with ATEC headquarters and the U.S. Army Evaluation Center.

== Operations ==
ATEC employs approximately 9,000 military, civilian, and contract employees. These employees consist of test officers, engineers, scientists, technicians, researchers, and evaluators. ATEC is involved in over 2,300 tests annually, encompassing anything from individual weapons to National Missile Defense systems.

The annual budget for the command is in excess of half a billion dollars.

ATEC conducts testing for all branches of the military, and maintains a large customer base that includes the National Security Agency, Joint Chiefs of Staff, allied foreign countries, and Congress.

== Test centers and subordinate units ==
Army Test and Evaluation Command has locations throughout the continental United States and Hawaii. Its headquarters are located at Aberdeen Proving Ground, Maryland.

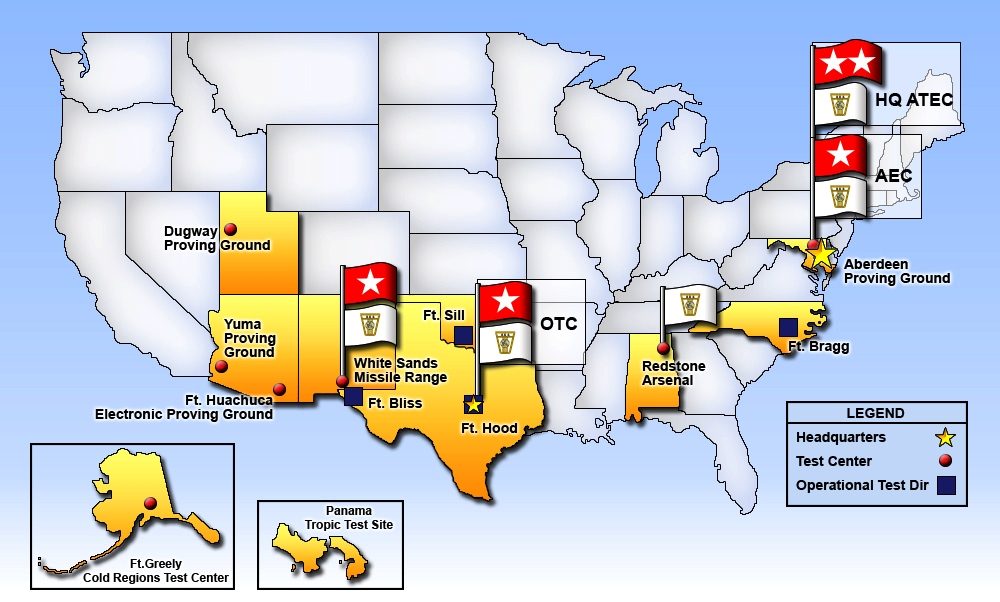
United States-based facilities and locations of the Army Test and Evaluation Command (ATEC)

Related test centers and subordinate units:

- Aberdeen Proving Ground (APG)
  - Aberdeen Test Center (ATC)
  - Joint Test Element (JTE)
- Army Evaluation Center (AEC)
- Dugway Proving Ground (DPG)
  - West Desert Test Center (WDTC)
- Electronic Proving Ground (EPG)
- Operational Test Command (OTC)
- Redstone Test Center (RTC)
- White Sands Missile Range (WSMR)
- Yuma Proving Ground (YPG)
  - Yuma Test Center (YTC)
  - Tropic Regions Test Center (TRTC)
  - Arctic Region Test Center (ARTC)
The Airborne and Special Operations Test Directorate test-drop a LAV-25A2 for suitability as an armor platform for airborne units

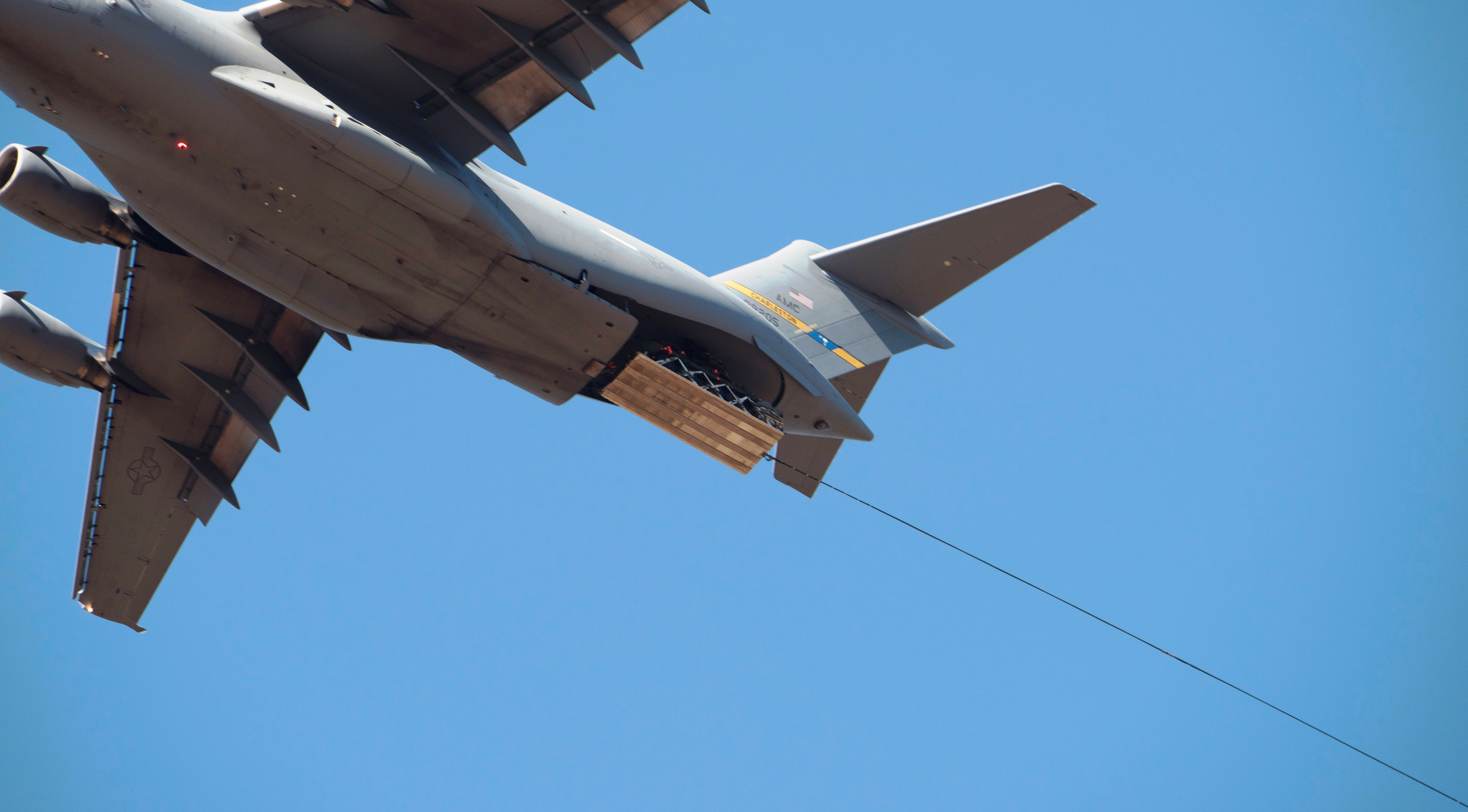
At Fort Bragg, an LAV-25A2 is delivered by
a USAF C-17 at 1,500 ft (457 m)...

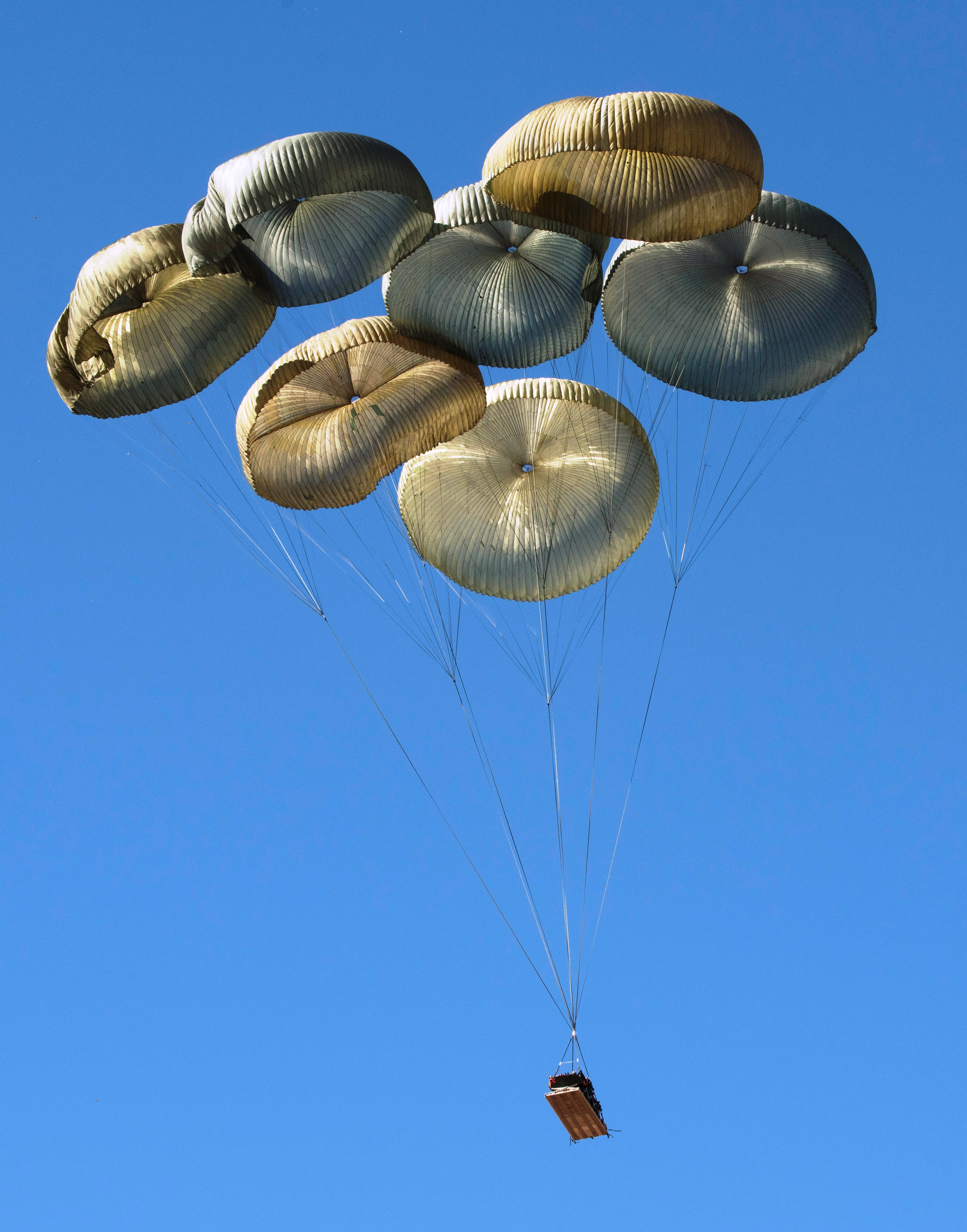
is airdropped onto Sicily Drop Zone...

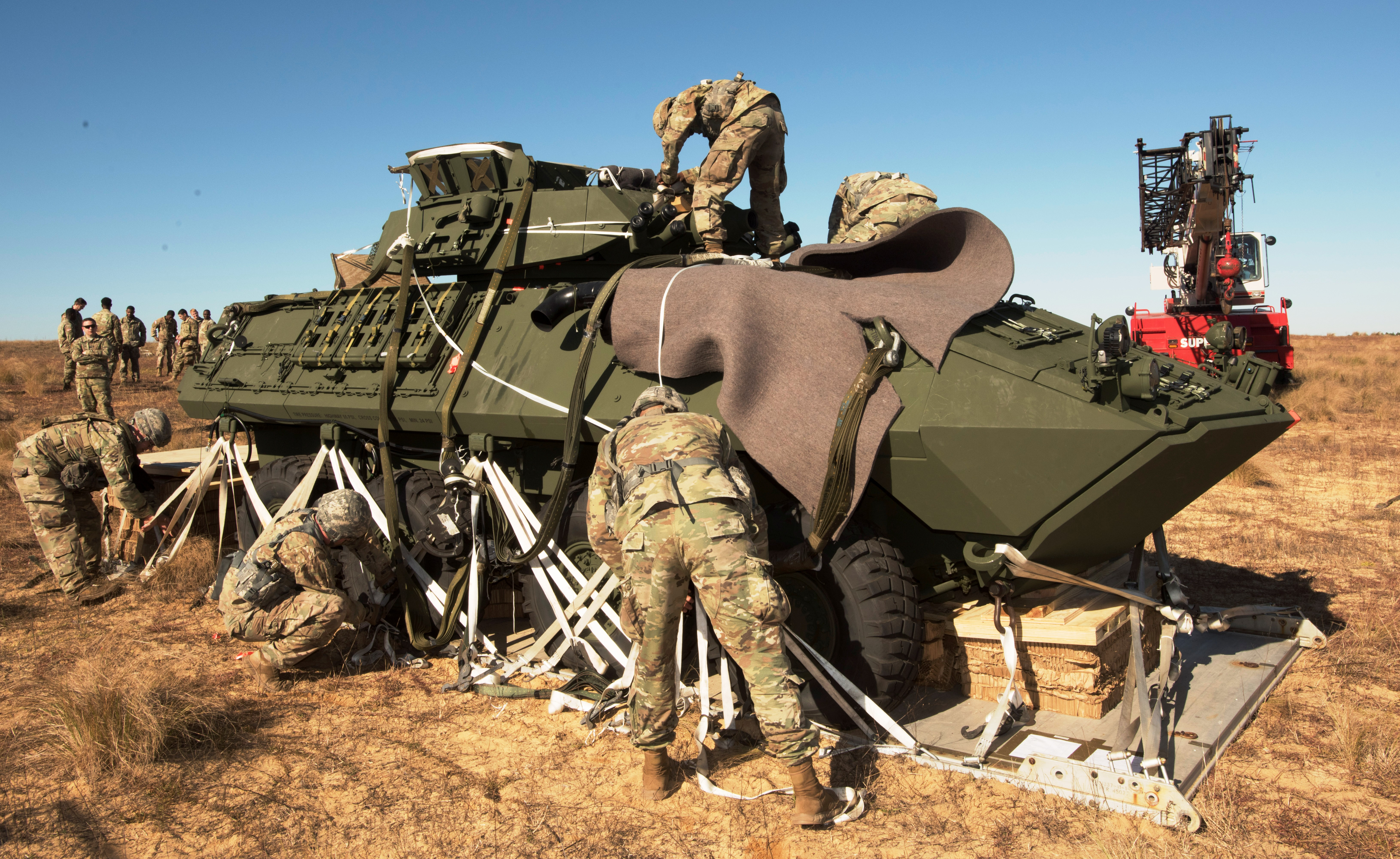
and U.S. Army paratroopers prepare the LAV for action...

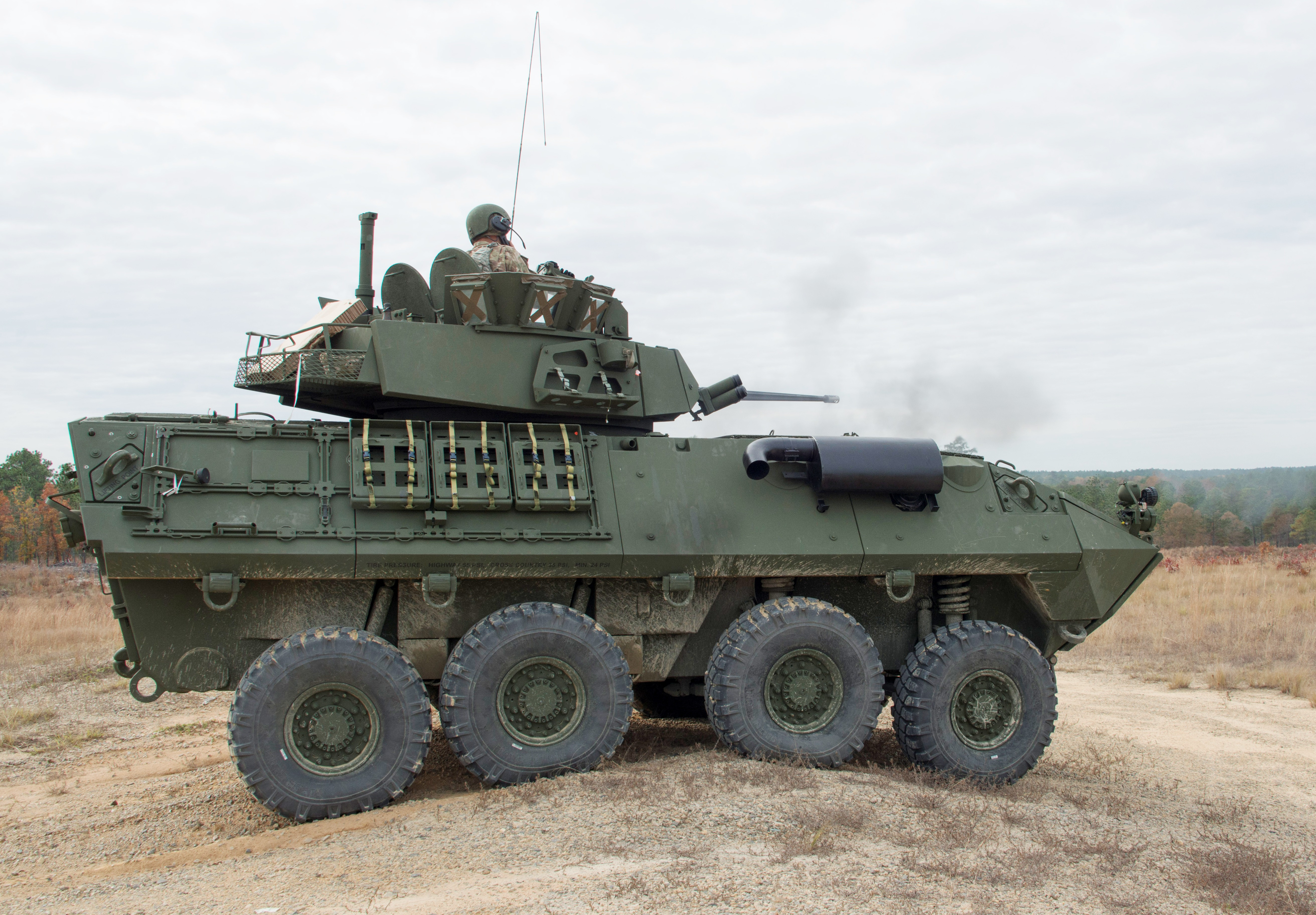
then test-fire its weapons, as part of OTC's airdrop certification.

ATEC subordinate, Operational Test Command (OTC) locations:

- Fort Hood
  - OTC headquarters
  - Aviation Test Directorate (AVTD)
  - Test Technology Directorate (TTD)
  - Maneuver Test Directorate (MTD)
  - Maneuver Support and Sustainment Test Directorate (MS2TD)
  - Mission Command Test Directorate (MCTD)
- Fort Bragg
  - Airborne and Special Operations Test Directorate (ABNSOTD)
- Fort Bliss
  - Air and Missile Defense Test Directorate (AMDTD)
- Fort Sill
  - Fire Support Test Directorate (FSTD)
- Fort Huachuca
  - Intelligence Electronic Warfare Test Directorate (IEWTD)

== See also ==
Similar organizations of the U.S. Navy and Marine Corps

- Marine Corps Test Unit (MCTU), defunct experimentation unit
- Marine Corps Operational Test and Evaluation Activity (MCOTEA), an independent U.S. Navy test organization
- Naval Air Warfare Center, research organization
- Naval Undersea Warfare Center (NUWC), submarine research organization
- Operational Test and Evaluation Force (OPTEVFOR), operational testing and evaluation organization

Similar organizations of the U.S. Air Force

- Air Force Operational Test and Evaluation Center (AFOTEC), an independent U.S. Air Force test organization
- Air Force Test Center (AFTC), research and flight testing organization

Similar organizations of the U.S. Space Force

- Space Training and Readiness Command (STARCOM), responsible for independent U.S. Space Force test and evaluation

Similar DoD organizations and roles

- Director, Operational Test and Evaluation (DOT&E), presidentially-appointed adviser to the U.S. Secretary of Defense on all DoD research
- Joint Interoperability Test Command (JITC), DoD information technology testing organization
