= Marine Corps Operational Test and Evaluation Activity =

Marine Corps Operational Test and Evaluation Activity (MCOTEA) is the independent Operational Test and Evaluation (OT&E) authority for the U.S. Marine Corps. MCOTEA plans, executes, and evaluates testing of material solutions against warfighter capabilities, under prescribed realistic conditions and doctrine, to determine Operational Effectiveness, Operational Suitability, and Operational Survivability (OE/OS/OSur) of all new equipment for the Corps in support of its acquisition process. MCOTEA is based at Marine Corps Base Quantico. Unlike most Marine Corps organizations, MCOTEA has a Director instead of a Commander.

== Organization ==
- Combat Support Systems Division
- Fiscal Section
- Expeditionary Division
- Ground Division
- Marine Air Ground Task Force (MAGTF) Command & Control/Command, Control, Communications, Computers, Intelligence, Surveillance, and Reconnaissance (C2/C4ISR)
- Operations Research Analysis Division
- Mathematical Statistics Division
- Live Fire Division
- Cyber Division
- Office of the Scientific Advisor
- S-1 HR & Administration
- S-2 Science & Technology
- S-3 Operations
- S-4/S-6 Logistics/IT

== See also ==
- Director, Operational Test and Evaluation (DOT&E)
- Joint Interoperability Test Command (JITC)
- Office of Naval Research (ONR)
- U.S. Air Force Operational Test and Evaluation Center (AFOTEC)
- U.S. Army Test and Evaluation Command (ATEC)
- Operational Test and Evaluation Force (OPTEVFOR) - U.S. Navy
- U.S. Naval Research Laboratory (NRL)
