= Director, Operational Test and Evaluation =

Adviser to the US Secretary of Defense

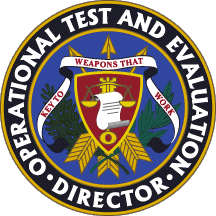
Director, Operational Test & Evaluation Official Seal

The Director, Operational Test and Evaluation (DOT&E) is the principal official and adviser to the US secretary of defense on operational and live fire test and evaluation activities involving U.S. Department of Defense weapons systems.

== Responsibilities ==
The director reports directly to the secretary and deputy secretary of defense, with the following responsibilities:

- Development and dissemination of Department of Defense operational test and evaluation policy and procedures
- Review and analysis of operational test and evaluation results for Department of Defense acquisition programs
- Independent assessments of operational test and evaluation activities as it pertains to budgetary and financial issues for the secretary of defense, the Department of Defense, and the United States Congress
- Oversight to ensure the adequacy of operational test and evaluation for major Department of Defense acquisition programs and to confirm the operational effectiveness and suitability of the defense systems in combat use

== History ==
The director's position was established September 24, 1983, by the Department of Defense Authorization Act of Fiscal Year 1984 (P.L. 98–94), and by Defense Directive 5141.2 of April 2, 1984.

== Organization ==
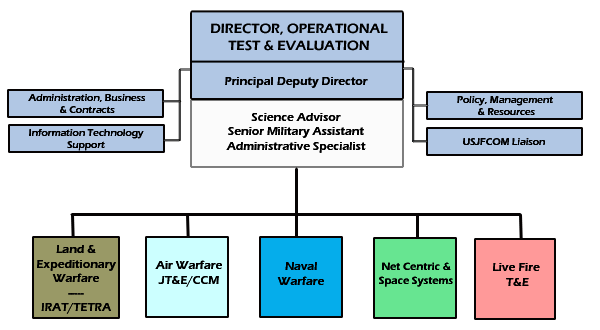

The Operational Test and Evaluation Directorate of the Office of the Secretary of Defense is organized as follows:

- Air Warfare Joint Test and Evaluation
- Land and Expeditionary Warfare / Integrated Resource Analysis Team/Test and Evaluation Threat Resource Activity (IRAT/TETRA)
- Live Fire Test and Evaluation
- Naval Warfare
- Net Centric and Space Systems

The Director of Operational Test and Evaluation also maintains liaison with the Joint Chiefs of Staff J6 Joint Deployable Analysis Team.

== Directors ==
Director, Operational Test and Evaluation
| Name | Tenure | SecDef(s) Served Under | President(s) Served Under |
|---|---|---|---|
| John E. Krings | April 18, 1985 - June 30, 1989 | Caspar W. Weinberger; Frank C. Carlucci III; William H. Taft IV (Acting); Richard B. Cheney | Ronald Reagan; George H. W. Bush |
| Robert C. Duncan | November 22, 1989 - January 20, 1993 | Richard B. Cheney | George H. W. Bush |
| Lee Frame (Acting) | January 21, 1993 - September 30, 1994 | Leslie Aspin, Jr. William J. Perry | William Clinton |
| Philip E. Coyle III | October 3, 1994 - January 19, 2001 | William J. Perry; William S. Cohen | William Clinton |
| Thomas P. Christie | July 17, 2001 - January 31, 2005 | Donald H. Rumsfeld | George W. Bush |
| David W. Duma (Acting) | February 1, 2005 - July 26, 2006 | Donald H. Rumsfeld | George W. Bush |
| Dr. Charles E. McQueary | July 27, 2006 - May 31, 2009 | Donald H. Rumsfeld; Robert M. Gates | George W. Bush; Barack Obama |
| David W. Duma (Acting) | June 1, 2009 - September 22, 2009 | Robert M. Gates | Barack Obama |
| Dr. J. Michael Gilmore | September 23, 2009 - January 19, 2017 | Robert M. Gates; Leon Panetta; Chuck Hagel; Ash Carter | Barack Obama |
| David W. Duma (Acting) | January 20, 2017 - December 10, 2017 | James Mattis | Donald Trump |
| Robert Behler | December 11, 2017 – January 20, 2021 | James Mattis; Patrick Shanahan (Acting); Mark Esper; Christopher C. Miller (Acting) | Donald Trump |
| Dr. Raymond D. O'Toole, Jr. (Acting) | January 20, 2021 – December 20, 2021 | David Norquist (Acting) Lloyd Austin | Joe Biden |
| Nickolas Guertin | December 20, 2021 – December 20, 2023 | Lloyd Austin | Joe Biden |
| Dr. Raymond D. O'Toole, Jr. (Acting) | December 20, 2023 – April 8, 2024 | Lloyd Austin | Joe Biden |
| Dr. Douglas C. Schmidt | April 8, 2024 – January 20, 2025 | Lloyd Austin | Joe Biden |
| Dr. Raymond D. O'Toole, Jr. (Acting) | January 20, 2025 – May 30, 2025 | Pete Hegseth | Donald Trump |
| Carroll P. (Rick) Quade (Acting) | May 30, 2025 – March 23, 2026 | Pete Hegseth | Donald Trump |
| Dr. Amy Henninger | March 23, 2026 – Present | Pete Hegseth | Donald Trump |

== See also ==
- Air Force Operational Test and Evaluation Center
- Joint Deployable Analysis Team
- Joint Interoperability Test Command
- Marine Corps Operational Test and Evaluation Activity
- Office of Naval Research
- Operational Test and Evaluation Force - U.S. Navy
- Test and evaluation master plan
- United States Army Test and Evaluation Command
- United States Naval Research Laboratory
