= Robert Behler =

United States Air Force general

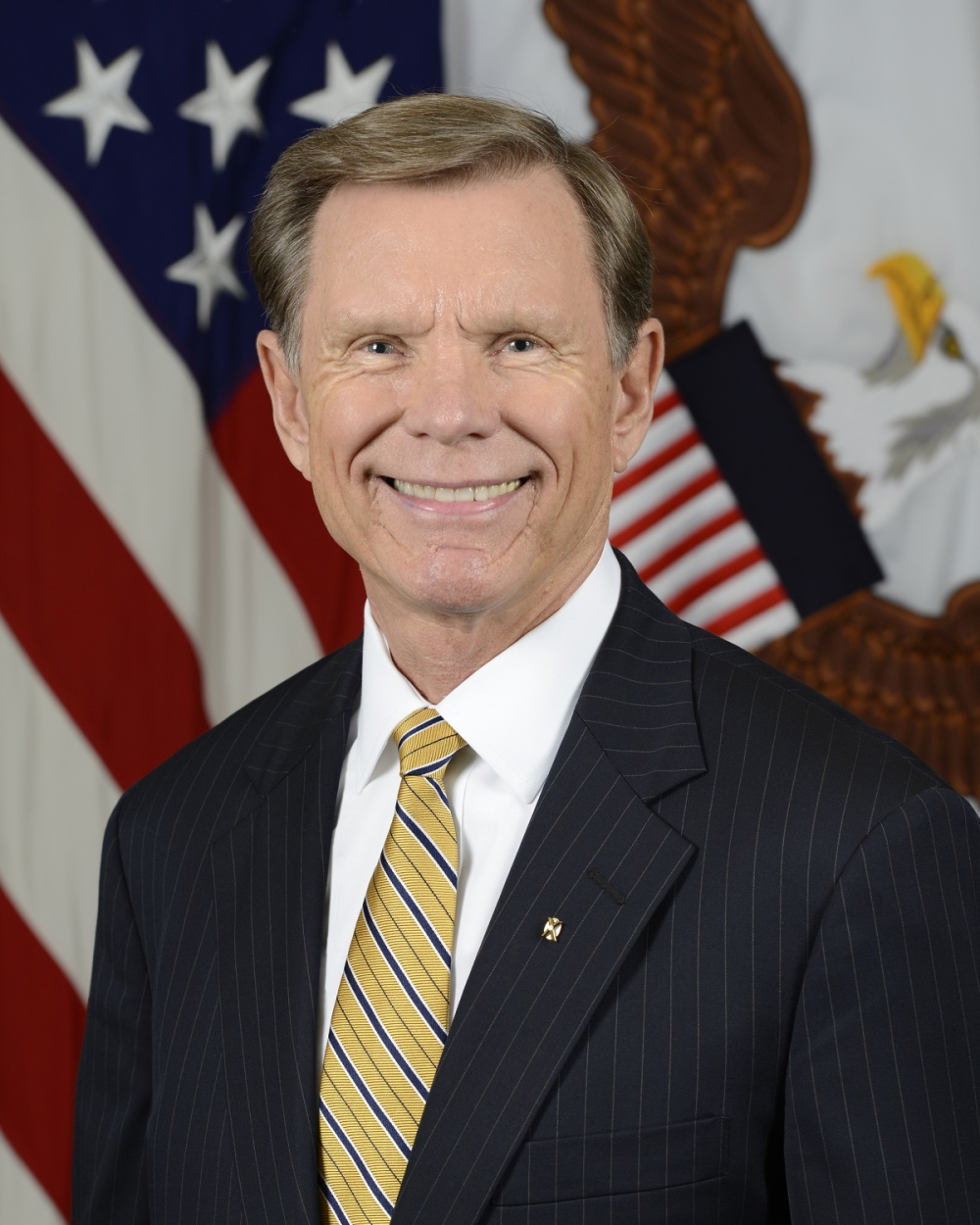

Director, Operational Test and Evaluation at the United States Department of Defense
- In office December 11, 2017 – January 20, 2021
- President: Donald Trump
- Preceded by: J. Michael Gilmore
- Succeeded by: Nickolas Guertin

Personal details
- Education: University of Oklahoma (BS, MS); Marymount University (MBA); U.S. Air Force Test Pilot School

Robert F. Behler is a retired United States Air Force major general and computer security expert who served as the Director, Operational Test and Evaluation at the United States Department of Defense from 2017 to 2021. Behler previously served as the chief operating officer and deputy director for Carnegie Mellon University's Software Engineering Institute. He has also held posts as president and chief operation officer of SRC Inc., as senior vice president and general manager at Mitre Corporation, and as the business area executive of Precision Engagement at the Johns Hopkins Applied Physics Laboratory.

Behler was formerly commanding general at the Air Force Command and Control & Intelligence, Surveillance and Reconnaissance Center as well as the deputy commander at Joint Headquarters North, NATO. An experimental test pilot with the U.S. Air Force, he flew more than 65 aircraft variants during his 31-year military career. Behler is a fellow of the Society of Experimental Test Pilots, an associate fellow of the American Institute of Aeronautics and Astronautics, and a member of the Armed Forces Communications and Electronics Association and Air Force Association. He is the recipient of various Distinguished Service Medals.

== Director of Operational Test and Evaluation ==
On September 5, 2017, Behler was nominated by President Donald Trump to become Director, Operational Test and Evaluation at the United States Department of Defense. His nomination was seen "as a nod to the increasingly critical and complex role software and cybersecurity plays in U.S. defense systems." At his confirmation hearing, Behler said he would seek to speed up Department of Defense acquisition efforts and focus on software development and prototyping new weapons systems. He was confirmed by the U.S. Senate November 16, 2017, and took office on December 11, 2017. Behler's term as DOT&E ended on January 20, 2021.
