= Joint terminal attack controller =

U.S. military term for a forward air controller

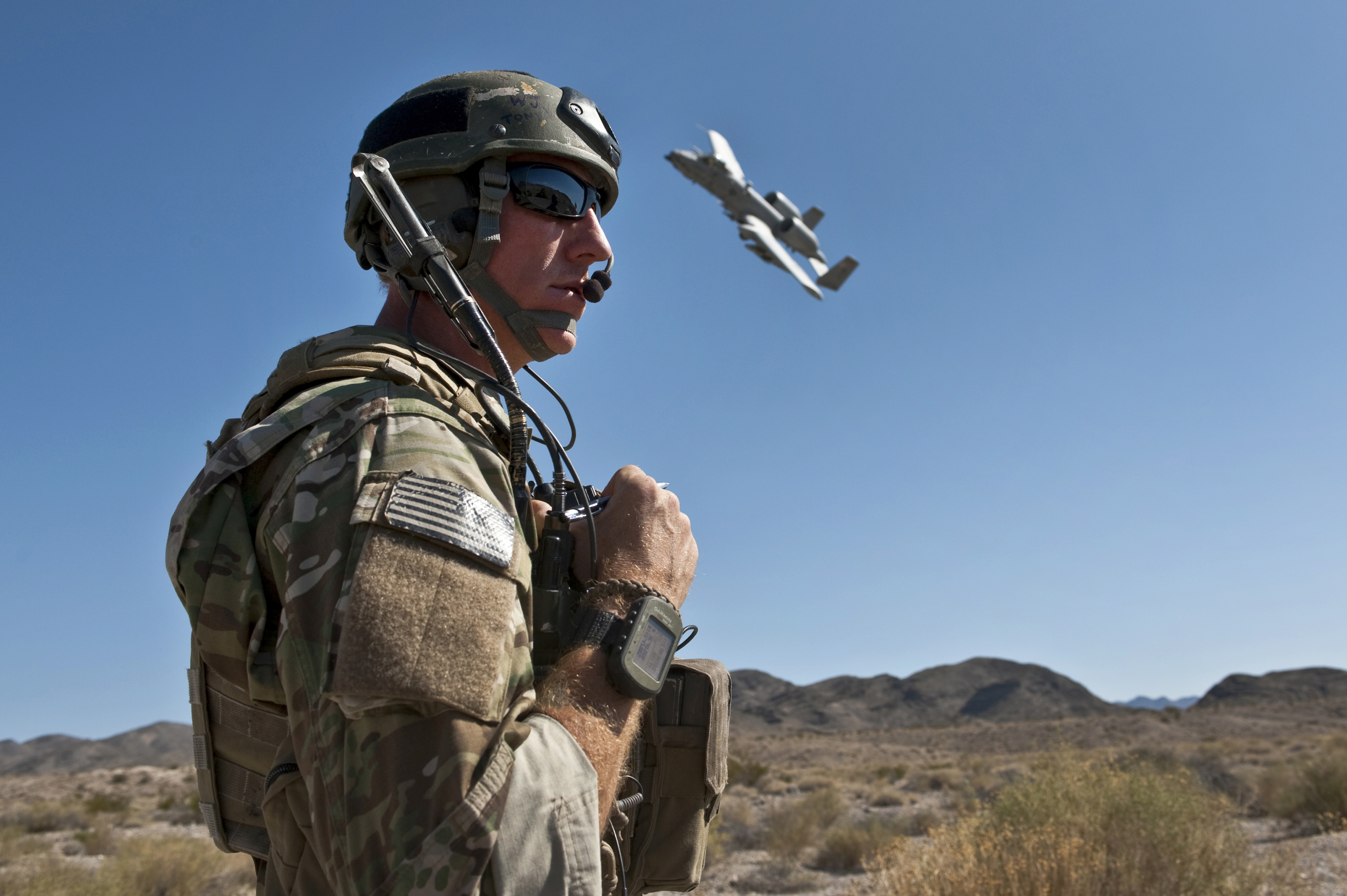
A United States Air Force joint terminal attack controller using a radio to coordinate close air support with an A-10 Thunderbolt II

Joint Terminal Attack Controller (JTAC) is the term used in the United States Armed Forces and some other military forces for a qualified service member who directs the action of military aircraft engaged in close air support and other offensive air operations from a forward position. The term that is used in most other countries, as well as previously in the U.S. and in the relevant NATO standard, is forward air controller. The term became effective in the U.S. on September 3, 2003 with the publishing of Joint Publication (JP) 3-09.3 Close Air Support.

== Australia ==
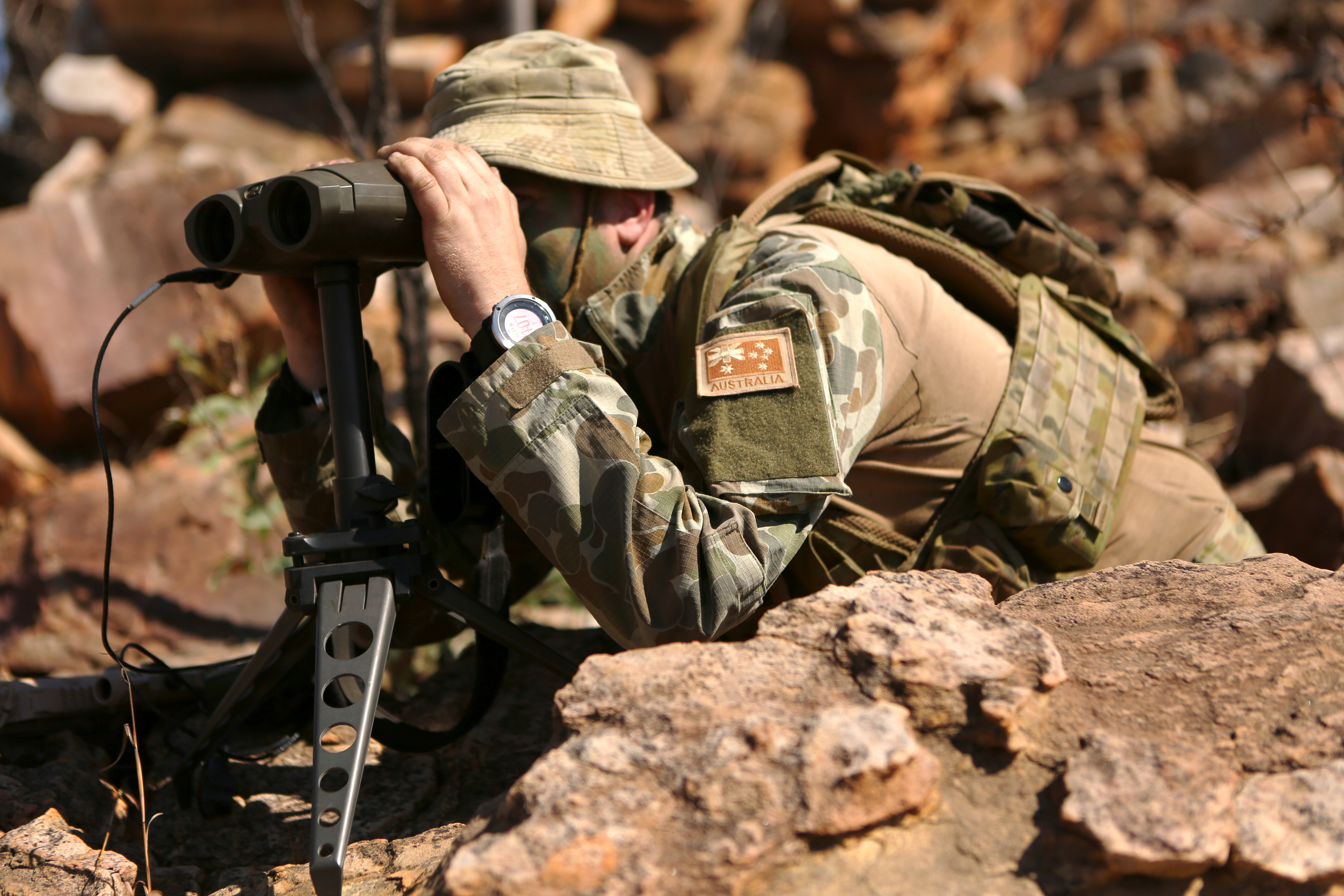
An Australian Army JTAC in 2016

In 2006, the Royal Australian Air Force became the first foreign air force to receive JTAC accreditation from the United States Joint Forces Command (USJFCOM). No. 4 Squadron RAAF runs JTAC training, and provides trained controllers to other units, with its main role being to support the units of the Special Operations Command. JTAC-qualified personnel have served in Afghanistan. The Australian Army's 16 Regiment, Royal Australian Artillery also includes a troop of JTACs.

== Bosnia and Herzegovina ==
The Armed Forces of Bosnia and Herzegovina are (as of December 2021) in the process of making and organizing their JTAC units with training from SOCEUR. U.S. Army SOF Soldiers are assisting and advising AF BiH in the creation of a national JTAC program which will be one of the first specialty-selected, trained, and equipped units in AF BiH.

== Canada ==
Canadian JTACs are currently part of the artillery observation battery. They are employed in the regular Canadian Army and as part of Canadian Special Operations Forces Command (CANSOFCOM). The Royal Canadian Air Force TACP personnel can also be employed in the JTAC role provided they successfully complete the JTAC course. There is current discussion on creating JTAC as a stand alone MOS/trade within the Canadian Armed Forces (CAF). It is currently executed as a secondary duty by mainly artillery Non-Commissioned Members (NCMs).

== Finland ==
The Finnish Army has JTACs as part of the professional SOF units, and some of the reserve officers trained as artillery observers also receive training in directing close air support. Finnish JTACs are trained according to US and NATO standards

== Italy ==
Italy has qualified JTAC operators in its tier 1, 2 and 3 teams. Some of these operators have served in Afghanistan, as part of TF45. During the Afghanistan War, AMX ground attack aircraft from the Italian Air Force TF BLACK CATS conducted Close Air Support with JTAC operators on the ground provided by the Italian Army, the Carabinieri, and the Navy and Air Force. The equipment used by Italian JTAC operators is not well publicized, although the equipment used by 185 RRAO has been briefly reported on. The training areas used by Italian JTACs are also kept secret. It has been reported that Italian JTACs will potentially work with the newest gunship, the MC-27J Praetorian in the future.

== United Kingdom ==
See: Forward air Control.

== United States ==
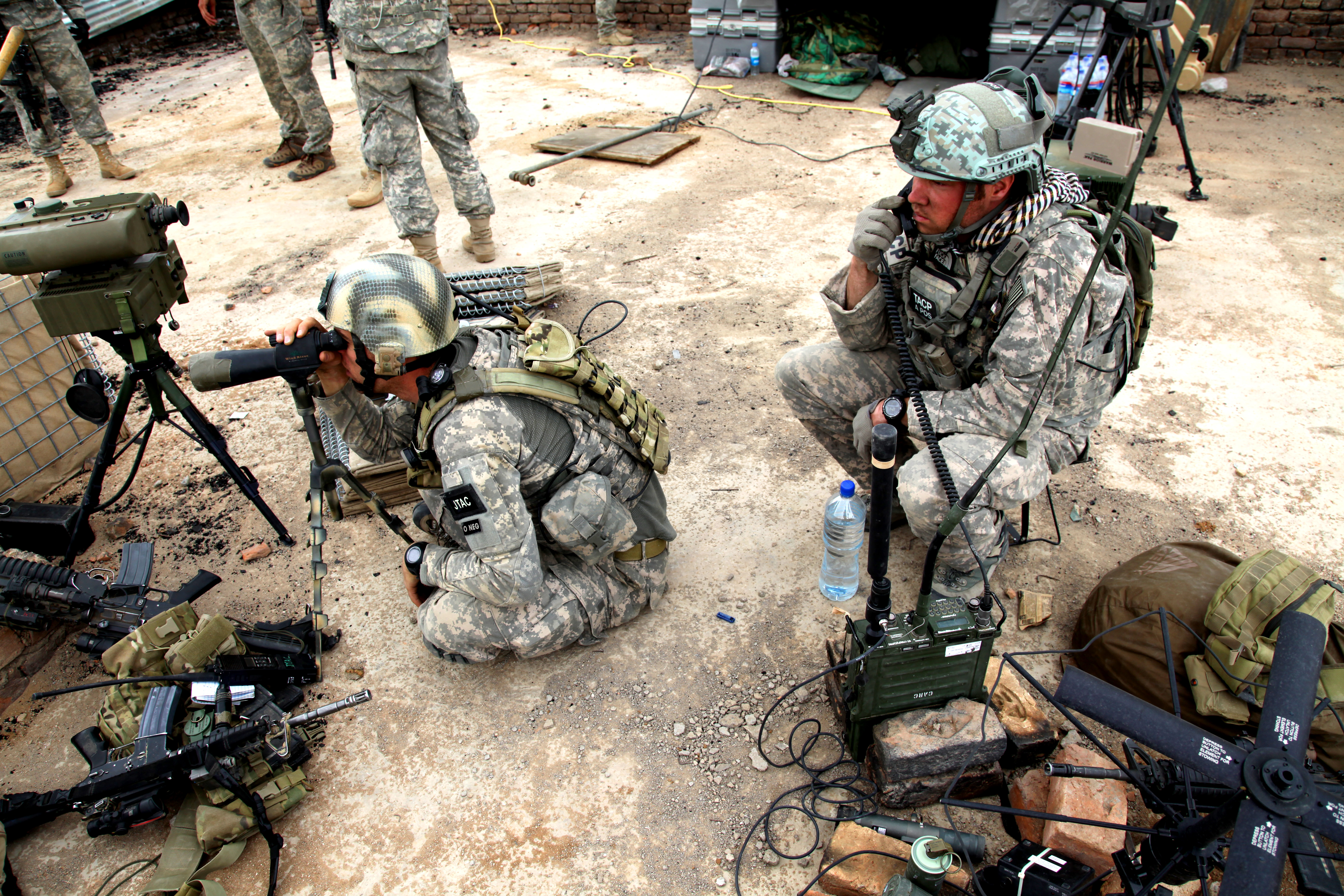
USAF TACP JTACs calling for close air support at Contingency Operating Post Jaghato, Afghanistan, May 1, 2010

A qualified and current JTAC is recognized across the U.S. Department of Defense as being capable and authorized to perform terminal attack control.

=== United States Air Force ===
The Air Force trains JTACs at two locations, Nellis Air Force Base, Nevada and Spangdahlem Air Base, Germany. At Nellis the 6th Combat Training Squadron has two JTAC courses; Joint Terminal Attack Controller Qualification Course, Joint Terminal Attack Controller Instructor Course. The JTAC course at Spangdahlem is through the Joint Firepower Center of Excellence (JFCOE).

Nellis is also home to the graduate-level JTAC Weapons Instructor Course through the U.S. Air Force Weapons School which is open to TACPs/ALOs and Combat Controllers/STOs. The course requires applicants to be qualified JTACs for three years and a JTAC Instructor for one year. The 5.5 month-long course is held twice per year and includes 752 total hours in classrooms and on ranges. The first class graduated in December 2012. They train in conjunction with pilots attending the Weapons School. As of June 24, 2015, 29 airmen have graduated from the JTAC Advanced Instructor Course.

=== United States Marine Corps ===
United States Marine Corps students undertake a rigorous five-week hands on training at the Expeditionary Warfare Training Group, Pacific (EWTGPAC), and Atlantic (EWTGLANT). Candidates for this school are USMC Fire Support Marines (0861), USMC Reconnaissance, or USMC pilots (Officers). United States Air Force students receive their training at Nellis Air Force Base in Nevada, while United States Navy students are trained at the Naval Strike and Air Warfare Center (NSAWC) at Naval Air Station Fallon in Nevada by SEALs assigned to NSAWC. The USMC requires that FACs:

- Must be winged Naval Aviators or NFO with at least 2 years operational flying experience.
- Must have attended and graduated from the Expeditionary Warfare Training Group (EWTG) Tactical Air Control Party (TACP) course.

At the completion of the TACP course Aviators are granted the 7502 FAC MOS and are considered certified and qualified JTACs.

Non-aviator FACs in the United States Marine Corps must meet the following requirements:

- They must be a Noncommissioned Officer or above, and must have a combat arms Military Occupational Specialty with one year of operational experience.
- Must complete JTAC primer course via MarineNet (distance online training).
- Must attend and graduate from either EWTGPAC or EWTGLANT TACP School.

When deployed on operations each USMC infantry company is allocated a FAC or JTAC. It is proposed that standard squad leaders could be trained as Joint Fires Observers.

=== Special Operations Forces ===
Members of special operations units may attend the Special Operations Terminal Attack Control Course (SOTACC) at Yuma Proving Ground, Arizona. SOTACC was established 2003 under the Army's John F. Kennedy Special Warfare Center and was subsequently transferred to the Air Force Special Operations Command's Special Tactics Training Squadron in 2008.

JDAT, formerly JFIIT, provided SMEs for the revision of the NATO Standardization Agreement (STANAG) 3733, the JFIRE Multi-Service Procedures for the Joint Application of Firepower publication, and Joint Terminal Attack Controller (JTAC) Memorandums of Agreement for DoD and partner nations.

== See also ==
- United States Air Force Combat Control Team
- Forward air control
- Joint Fires Observer
- Tactical Air Control Party
