= Joint Deployable Analysis Team =

Agency overview
- Formed: 2011
- Headquarters: Eglin Air Force Base
- Employees: 70+ military, government, and contractor civilian personnel
- Parent agency: Joint Chiefs of Staff - J6 DDC5I

The Joint Deployable Analysis Team (JDAT) is part of the J6 Directorate of the Joint Chiefs of Staff.

== JDAT Mission ==
JDAT conducts field analysis of command and control (C2) information systems and procedures producing decision-quality data to improve Joint C2 integration and interoperability.

== About ==
Located at Eglin Air Force Base, Florida, JDAT is made up of members from all four Services, Department of Defense civilian employees and contractor support. JDAT employs scientific methods to research, investigate, test, assess, and evaluate current and emergent Joint C2 information systems and associated procedures. These activities:

- measure capabilities and limitations,
- identify shortfalls and root cause,
- recommend and verify solutions,
- and validate joint capabilities.

The resulting empirical outcomes influence joint capability development in areas such as:

- Policy
- Joint doctrine
- Tactics, techniques and procedures
- integration of capabilities
- digital interoperability.

JDAT provides decision-quality data and cogent solutions to customers and stakeholders responsible for improving Joint C2 information systems integration and interoperability to inform acquisition decisions and ensure that services and agencies field interdependent and interoperable systems. JDAT validates DOTMLPF requirements.

The emphasis of JDAT assessment efforts is the evaluation of C2 Information Systems and Procedures to provide services and agencies (such as the Joint Requirements Oversight Council) findings and recommendations based on quantifiable data in order to improve Joint C2 integration and interoperability. JDAT collects and analyzes data and provides observations, findings, conclusions, and recommendations to identify policy, Joint doctrine, tactics, techniques, and procedures (TTP); and material solutions and products that promote capability improvement. Evaluations range from small, single-focus events to large, multi-event/venue exercises.

In 2012, JDAT along with the Missile Defense Agency and various support services' program managers, developed a demonstration to improve the joint tactical air picture improving the data sharing of both friendly and threat air and missile defense information.

For the 2013 Bold Quest coalition demonstration, JDAT led the test plan design, execution control, and emplaced the necessary infrastructure to connect the numerous geographic sites across seven states.

In 2015, JDAT participated in Bold Quest 15.2 (a Joint and Multinational capability assessment event) to optimize U.S. and coalition fire support system machine-to-machine (digital) interoperability from tactical to operational; target acquisition to prosecution.

JDAT occasionally displays data from Test and Training Enabling Architecture (TENA) to support analysis in Joint Mission Environment Test Capability (JMETC) events.

== JDAT History ==
JFIIT
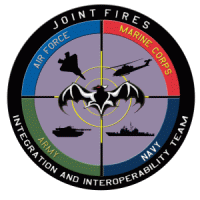

Agency overview
- Formed: 2005
- Headquarters: Eglin Air Force Base
- Employees: 90+ military, government, and contractor civilian personnel
- Parent agency: United States Joint Forces Command - J6

JDAT was transitioned out of the United States Joint Forces Command (USJFCOM) Joint Fires Integration and Interoperability Team (JFIIT) in June 2011.

=== JFIIT (2005-2011) ===
On February 24, 2005, JFIIT was formed from the capabilities of two organizations with a new direction and a new mission. JFIIT was tasked with improving the integration, interoperability and effectiveness of Joint fires. USJFCOM established JFIIT to provide assistance to Joint force commanders and Service headquarters in planning, coordinating and executing Joint fires at the tactical level. JFIIT took a holistic approach to improving Joint fires by providing solutions that produce effective target acquisition, command and control, and interoperable firing systems, thereby reducing fratricide and collateral damage.

Tactics, techniques and procedures (TTP) developed by JFIIT have worked in theater and have been adopted by the military. JFIIT enhanced joint close air support (CAS) training for aircrews, Joint terminal attack controllers (JTACs), and Joint Fires Observers (JFOs) improving new technologies like digitally aided CAS by improving their combat effectiveness while reducing the potential of fratricide and collateral damage. JFIIT participation in the digitally aided close air support (DACAS) change control board (CCB) ensured services work together to adopt or procure similar systems, technologies, capabilities, and methodologies to obtain ‘interoperability’ between service-specific weapon systems and platforms that enable successful employment of DACAS.

With the 2011 Exercise Spartan Resolve, JFIIT, the 505th Operations Squadron Joint Integration Team from Nellis Air Force Base, Nev and the MCTOG team provided the training audience with a combat-like experience that will pay important dividends to the entire unit."

In 2009, JFIIT tested cell phones and netbooks enabling dismounted soldiers to have effective battlespace situational awareness. Utilizing the Santa Rosa Island Range Complex, JFIIT, the 46th Test Wing, and multiple military units including coalition forces participated in a combat identification and air-to-ground targeting demonstration.

In 2007, JFIIT participated in a nine nation coalition operation exercise, Bold Quest, to 'solve the enduring problem of combat ID'. Assessment results were provided to each nation to determine what equipment could be fielded in the future to enhance coalition combat effectiveness and reduce fratricide. The countries that participated in this event included: Australia, Belgium, Canada, France, Germany, Netherlands, Sweden, United Kingdom, United States and NATO.

JFIIT's team was formed from the Joint Combat Identification Evaluation Team (JCIET) and the Joint Close Air Support Joint Test Team (JCAS JTT).

=== JCIET (2000-2005) ===
JCIET
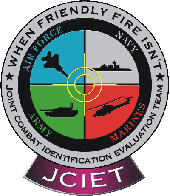
- Joint Combat Identification Evaluation Team. 4 quadrants represent the 4 services.

Agency overview
- Formed: 2000
- Headquarters: Eglin Air Force Base
- Employees: 50+ military, government, and contractor civilian personnel
- Parent agency: United States Joint Forces Command

JCIET became a joint activity under USJFCOM in October 2000 and evolved into an annual event that was the nation's primary means to analyze how the military identifies friendly and enemy targets on the battlefield. JCIET assessed issues associated with combat identification and finding doctrinal, technological, and procedural solutions to reduce the incidence of fratricide. JCIET coordinated joint exercises in which multiple Service platforms are tested for performance in detection, tracking, and identification of airborne threats. The data collection and evaluation from these exercises aided in determining how to address the advanced cruise missile threat.

==== ASCIET (1995-1999) ====
The All Service Combat Identification Team (ASCIET), the forerunner of JCIET, was established in 1994. In September 1995, ASCIET 95, a live, joint evaluation was held in the Gulf of Mexico near Gulfport, Mississippi to improve combat identification and thereby minimize fratricide among the U.S. Army, Navy, Air Force, and Marine Corps. In 1999, ASCIET brought all four branches of the U.S. military to Fort Stewart in southeast Georgia for a two-week exercise in friendly fire prevention. ASCIET was outgrowth of the Joint Air Defense Operations/Joint Engagement Zone (JADO/JEZ) Joint Test and Evaluation (JT&E) Joint Test Force under the direction of the Joint Staff strategic plans and programs.

=== JCAS JTT (1997-2005) ===
JCAS
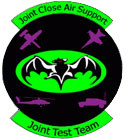
- The BAT represents the Battlefield Analysis Team. Each vehicle represents an armed service (Army, Air Force, Navy, Marines). The purple represents 'Joint' as it is the color that symbolizes all branches of the military.

Agency overview
- Formed: 1997
- Headquarters: Eglin Air Force Base
- Employees: 40+ military, government, and contractor civilian personnel
- Parent agency: Office of the Secretary of Defense

JCAS JTT was tasked by the Office of the Secretary of Defense to improve the operational effectiveness of joint U.S. close air support. At this time, distinguishing between neutral and hostile aircraft was probably the hardest combat ID challenge. In 2001, before the current taken-for-granted GPS tracking, the JCAS team instrumented every player in a training event at the Fort Irwin National Training Center and Marine Corps Air Ground Combat Center to provide the simulated battle in real time for analysis. The analysis team can see where everyone was at all times during the battle, assisting with the evaluation.

== See also ==
- Office of the Secretary of Defense
- Joint Chiefs of Staff
- Chairman of the Joint Chiefs of Staff
- Department of Defense
- Eglin Air Force Base
- Identification of friend or foe (IFF)
- C4ISR
