= J. Michael Gilmore =

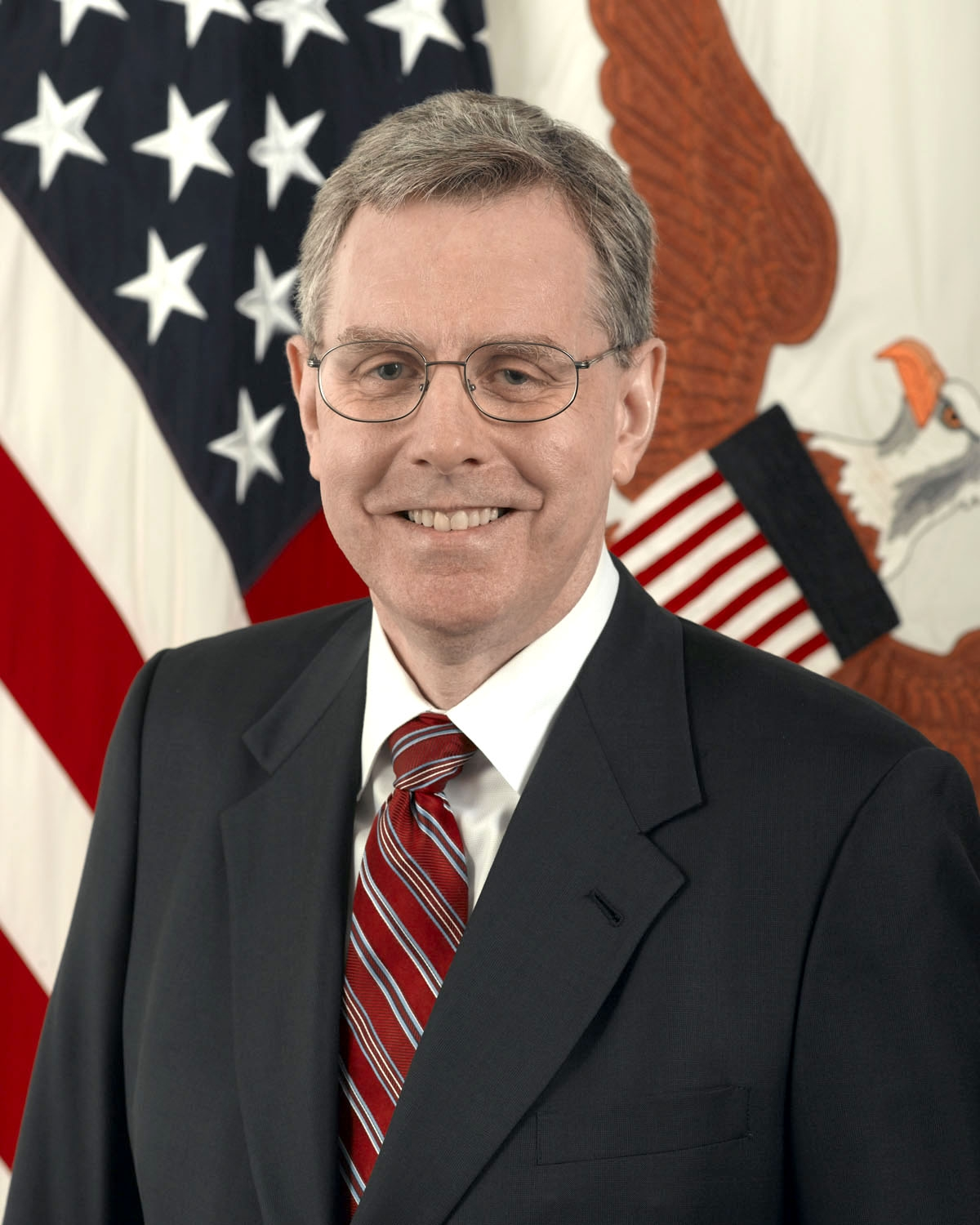
Department of Defense portrait

James Michael Gilmore (born September 24, 1954) is a former director of the Operational Test and Evaluation Directorate of the United States Department of Defense. Gilmore served as assistant director for national security of the Congressional Budget Office and deputy director of general purpose programs in the Office of the Director, Program Analysis and Evaluation of the Department of Defense. He was served as the director of the Operational Test and Evaluation Directorate from 2009 to 2017.

== Biography ==
Born in Richmond, Virginia and raised in Ohio, Gilmore attended Salem Senior High in Salem, Ohio and graduated in 1972. He is a graduate of the Massachusetts Institute of Technology with a B.Sc. degree in physics in May 1976 and the University of Wisconsin-Madison with a Ph.D. degree in nuclear engineering in December 1980.

Early in his career, Gilmore worked at the Lawrence Livermore National Laboratory, performing research in their magnetic fusion energy program. He has also worked as an analyst with Falcon Associates and the McDonnell Douglas Washington Studies and Analysis Group, where he became Manager, Electronic Systems Company Analysis.

Gilmore was deputy director of general purpose programs within the Office of the Secretary of Defense, Program Analysis and Evaluation (OSD(PA&E)). As the deputy director, he was responsible for developing, formulating, and implementing Secretary of Defense policies on all aspects of Department of Defense general purpose programs, including analyzing the operational effectiveness and costs of U.S. conventional military forces and supporting programs. Before serving as a deputy director, Gilmore served as the division director of operations analysis and procurement planning, within the Office of the Deputy Director, Resource Analysis and prior to that as an analyst for Strategic Defensive and Space Programs Division, Office of the deputy director, Strategic and Space Programs. Gilmore's service with Program Analysis and Evaluation covered 11 years.

Prior to his current appointment Gilmore was the assistant director for national security at the Congressional Budget Office (CBO). In this position, he was responsible for CBO's National Security Division, which performs analyses of major policy and program issues in national defense, international affairs, and veterans’ affairs. Specific areas of investigation included the long-term implications of current defense policies and programs, the implications of transformation for equipping and operating U.S. military forces, the effectiveness and costs of alternative approaches to modernizing U.S. military forces, and the resource demands associated with operating and supporting U.S. military forces.

Gilmore was sworn in as director of operational test and evaluation on September 23, 2009. A presidential appointee confirmed by the United States Senate, he served as the senior advisor to the secretary of defense on operational and live fire test and evaluation of Department of Defense weapon systems. On January 19, 2017, Gilmore left the position of director, operational test and evaluation.

Gilmore resides in Virginia.
