= Joint Interoperability Test Command =

Unit of the United States Department of Defense

The Joint Interoperability Test Command (JITC) is a wing of the United States Department of Defense that tests and certifies information technology products for military use.

== History ==
The JITC had its roots in the TRI-TAC program of the 1970s, which sought to streamline and test the technology behind field and tactical command systems. The program began officially in 1971, and work started in 1976 at Fort Huachuca in southern Arizona. The TRI-TAC program tested various field equipment for years, but ran into problems with working with other branches of the Department of Defense's testing programs. With an eye to fix this problem, the TRI-TAC program was rebranded and refocused in 1984 to become the Joint Tactical Command, Control, and Communications Agency (JTC3A). This led to the Fort Huachuca part of the operations to be renamed as the Joint Interoperability Test Force (JITF). Continued problems with cooperation and coordination between different testing agencies in the 80's led to another round of consolidation, which turned the Fort Huachuca operations into the Joint Interoperability Test Center (also abbreviated as JITC – somewhat confusingly – but not the same as the Joint Interoperability Test Command). Operations were further consolidated in 1988, and then in 1989 the Test Center gained its final name of the Joint Interoperability Test Command (JITC). These final rounds of consolidation were concurrent with a Department of Defense push towards "interoperability", which aimed to ensure that military technology could work across branches of the military, between different arms of the same branch of the military, and even between nations as coalition military action became more frequent.

The focus of the JITC shifted towards interoperability and information technology testing in the 90's. By 2011 it employed more than 1,300 military personnel and contractors to test and certify military technology.

== Locations ==
JITC facilities are located at Fort Huachuca, Arizona and Fort George G. Meade, Maryland. An additional JITC mission used to exist at Indian Head, Maryland, but was closed in December 2016 resulting in testing moving to either Fort Huachuca, Arizona or Fort Meade, Maryland.
