= Glossary of military modeling and simulation =

The US DoD Modeling and Simulation Glossary (formally known as DoD 5000.59-M), was originally created in 1998. As of October 2010 the glossary was being updated, without changing its main objective of providing a uniform language for use by the M&S community. This article contains a list of terms and acronyms, based on the original DoD 5000.59-M and information related to the update.

== History ==
The original DoD Modeling and Simulation glossary: DoD 5000.59 was created in 1998, in hopes to promote a uniform set of terms across the Department of Defense. The glossary consisted of three sections: sources, acronyms and terms. The first section was a set of sources from where the information for the glossary was accessed from. Second, a list of M&S related acronyms, and lastly a set of M&S terms with definitions.

== Update ==
Since 1998, the world of Modeling and Simulation has expanded. With the rise of new technology including augmented reality, mixed reality, virtual worlds, SCORM (Sharable Content Object Reference Model), and agent based simulation, it has become apparent that as the industry of Modeling and Simulation continues to change and grow, so should its language. Thus, a team of authors (University of Central Florida's (UCF) Institute for Simulation and Training (IST), contracted by the Joint Training Integration and Evaluation Center (JTIEC)) have set to revise and update the Modeling and Simulation Glossary to include new terminology, and to exclude out of date information.

Changes

The main objective of this effort was not to completely change the original 1998 M&S glossary, but rather to update and upgrade it.

The authors decided to err on the side of keeping the glossary inclusive of information rather than exclusive when it came to the addition of new terms and acronyms, while still maintaining a sense of readability. To that end the authors reached out to the research and academic communities for references and materials used in their M&S pursuits. The result was a comprehensive bibliography and description of terms at a general level, with the aim that for those interested, more detailed information could be found in the reference. At the current state of the glossary, it includes the addition of 35 references, 180 acronyms, and 500 definitions (includes multiple definitions). The glossary was to be fully completed by late 2010.

The glossary includes contribution from many US military organizations.

== 0–9 ==
Acronym/Term	Expansion	Definition	Authoritative source	Links	Notes
3CE	Cross Command Collaborative Effort		PM FCS		
3DViz	Three Dimensional Visualization		CERDEC		
6DoF	Six degrees of freedom		Degrees of freedom (mechanics)		

== A ==
Acronym/Term	Expansion	Definition	Authoritative source	Links	Notes
A-MSRR	Army-MSRR		AMSO		
A/NM	Administrative/Network Management		NDIA		
A2C2S	Army Airborne Command and Control Systems		PEO C3T		
AAEF	Air Assault Expeditionary Force		TRADOC		
AAR	After Action Review		DoA		
ABCS	Army Battle Command System		PM BC		
AC2DP	Army Concept & Capability Developments Plan		ARCIC		
ACA	Army Contracting Agency		ASA(ALT)		
ACAT	Acquisition Category		DAU		
ACR	Advanced Concepts and Requirements		MSCO		
ACTD	Advanced Concept Technology Demonstration		DARPA		
AD	Airspace Deconfliction		DoD		
AEC	Army Evaluation Center		ATEC		
AEWE	Army Expeditionary Warrior Experiment		Maneuver Battle Laboratory (MBL)		Formerly Air Assault Expeditionary Force (AAEF)
AFATDS	Advanced Field Artillery Tactical Data System		PM BC		
Aggregation		The ability to group entities while preserving the effects of entity behavior and interaction while grouped.	PM BC		
AGM	Attack Guidance Matrix		FM 6–20–10		
AIDE	Agile Integration Demonstration and Experimentation		RDECOM		
AKO	Army Knowledge Online		PM AKO/DKO		
AKSS	AT&L Knowledge Sharing System		USD(AT&L)		
AMC	United States Army Materiel Command		HQDA		
AMP	Army Modernization Plan		RDECOM		
AMRDEC	United States Army Aviation and Missile Research, Development, and Engineering Center		RDECOM		
AMSAA	United States Army Materiel Systems Analysis Activity		RDECOM		
AMSEC	Army Model and Simulation Executive Council		AR 5–11		
AMSO	Army Modeling & Simulation Office		DCS G-8		
APL	Applied Physics Laboratory		Johns Hopkins University		
APM	Assistant Project Manager		PM CATT		
APM CCTT	Assistant Project Manager Close Combat Tactical Trainer		PM CATT		
APS	Active Protection System		DoD		
AR	Army Regulation		DoA		
Architecture	The structure of components, their relationships, and the principles and guidelines governing their design and evolution over time.		IEEE Std 610.12-1990		
ARCIC	U.S. Army Capabilities Integration Center		TRADOC		
ARDEC	United States Army Armament Research, Development and Engineering Center		RDECOM		
ARL	Army Research Laboratory		RDECOM		
ARO	Army Research Office		ARL		
ASA(ALT)	United States Assistant Secretary of the Army for Acquisition, Logistics, and Technology		HQDA		
ASD(NCBDP)	Assistant to the Secretary of Defense for Nuclear & Chemical & Biological Defense Programs		USD(AT&L)		
ASTAG	Army Science and Technology Advisory Group		SAAL-ZT		
ASM Sensor	Acoustic, Seismic, and Magnetic Sensor		Geophysical MASINT		
ASTMP	Army Science and Technology Master Plan		SAAL-ZT		
AT&L	Acquisition, Logistics, and Technology		HQDA		
ATAM	Architecture Tradeoff Analysis Method		SEI		
ATD	Advanced Technology Demonstration		ASTMP		
ATEC	United States Army Test and Evaluation Command		HQDA		
ATO	Army Technology Objectives		ASTMP		
ATO-D	Army Technology Objectives-Demonstration		ASTMP		
AUTL	Army Universal Task List		FM 7-15		
AV	All View	DoDAF set of views that contains the AV-1 and AV-2.	DoDAF		
AV-1	All View-1	DoDAF view for scope, purpose, intended users, environment depicted, and analytical findings.	DoDAF		
AV-2	All View-2	DoDAF view for architecture data repository with definitions of all acronyms/terms used in all products. AV-2 is also known as the Integrated Dictionary.	DoDAF		
AVCATT	Aviation Combined Arms Tactical Trainer - Aviation Reconfigurable Manned Simulator		PM ACTT		
AW	Asymmetric Warfare		DoD		

== B ==
Acronym/Term	Expansion	Definition	Authoritative source	Links	Notes
B-Kit		Add-on configurable armor used on compatible vehicle chassis such as the HMMWV.	PEO GCS		
BC	Battle Command		DoA		
BCS3	Battlefield Command Sustainment Support System		PM BCS3		
BCT	Brigade Combat Team		PM FCS		
BDA	Battle damage assessment	The estimate of damage resulting from the application of lethal or nonlethal military force. Battle damage assessment is composed of physical damage assessment, functional damage assessment, and target system assessment.	JP 3–0		
BICC	Battlefield Information Coordination Center		FM 101–5–1		
BLCSE	Battle Laboratory Collaborative Simulation Environment		ARCIC		
BML	Battle management language		SISO		
BPDM	Business Process Definition Metamodel		OMG		
BPEL	Business Process Execution Language		OMG		
BPMN	Business Process Modeling Notation		OMG		

== C ==
Acronym/Term	Expansion	Definition	Authoritative source	Links	Notes
C2IEDM	Command and Control Information Exchange Data Model		Multilateral Interoperability Programme		
C4	Command, Control, Communications, Computers		DoD		
C4ISR	Command, Control, Communications, Computers, Intelligence, Surveillance and Reconnaissance		DoD	C4ISTAR	
CAA	Center for Army Analysis		HQDA		
CAB	Combined Arms Battalion		DoD		
CAC	Combined Arms Center		TRADOC		
CASSI	Concept, Analysis, System Simulation & Integration		TARDEC		
CDRT	Capabilities Development for Rapid Transition		DoA		
CERDEC	United States Army Communications-Electronics Research Development and Engineering Center		RDECOM		
CMU	Carnegie Mellon University				
CNA	Capability Needs Analysis		ARCIC		
COP	Common Operational Picture		DoD		
CREW	Counter Radio Controlled IED Electronics Warfare		Naval Surface Warfare Center Crane Division		
CRM	Conceptual Reference Model				
CS	Capability Set		OASA(ALT)		
CSM	Capability Set Management		OASA(ALT)		
CSMB	Capability Set Management Board		OASA(ALT)		
CSMP	Capability Set Management Process		OASA(ALT)		
CTSF	Central Technical Support Facility		PEO C3T PEO C3T		
Cultural Factors			DoD		
Cultural Features			DoD		

== D ==
Acronym/Term	Expansion	Definition	Authoritative source	Links	Notes
DAU	Defense Acquisition University		USD(AT&L)		
DARPA	Defense Advanced Research Projects Agency		DoD		
DIS	Distributed Interactive Simulation		IEEE		
DCS G-8	Deputy Chief of Staff G-8 of the United States Army		VCSA		
DDRE	Director of Defense Research and Engineering		USD(AT&L)		
DoA	Department of the Army		DoD		
DoD	Department of Defense		United States Federal Government		
DoDAF	Department of Defense Architecture Framework		DoD		
DPP	Director of Plans & Programs		DDRE		
DVL	Distributed Virtual Laboratory		MATREX		
Dynamic Terrain			PM FCS		
Dynamic Weather			PM FCS		

== E ==
Acronym/Term	Expansion	Definition	Authoritative source	Links	Notes
EA	Executable Architecture				
ECBC	United States Army Edgewood Chemical and Biological Center		RDECOM		
EMDS	United States Army Enterprise Management Decision Support		RDECOM		

== F ==
Acronym/Term	Expansion	Definition	Authoritative source	Links	Notes
FCS (BCT)	Future Combat Systems (Brigade Combat Team)		SAAL-ZB		

== G ==
Acronym/Term	Expansion	Definition	Authoritative source	Links	Notes

== H ==
Acronym/Term	Expansion	Definition	Authoritative source	Links	Notes
HITL	Human-in-the-Loop		DoD 5000.59-M		
HQDA	Headquarters, Department of the Army		DoA		
HMMWV	High Mobility Multipurpose Wheeled Vehicle		PEO GCS		

== I ==
Acronym/Term	Expansion	Definition	Authoritative source	Links	Notes
I/ITSEC	Interservice/Industry Training, Simulation and Education Conference		I/ITSEC		
IW	Irregular warfare		DoD		

== J ==
Acronym/Term	Expansion	Definition	Authoritative source	Links	Notes
JCA	Joint Capability Area		CJCS		
JCIDS	Joint Capabilities Integration Development System		CJCS		
JPD	Joint Planning Document		CJCS		
JUONS	Joint Urgent Operational Needs		CJCS		

== K ==
Acronym/Term	Expansion	Definition	Authoritative source	Links	Notes

== L ==
Acronym/Term	Expansion	Definition	Authoritative source	Links	Notes
LCIM	Levels of Conceptual Interoperability Model		SISO	Conceptual interoperability	
LOP	Local Operational Picture		DoD		
LVC	Live, Virtual, and Constructive		DoD 5000.59-M		
LWN	LandWarNet		United States Department of the Army Chief Information Officer/G-6		

== M ==
Acronym/Term	Expansion	Definition	Authoritative source	Links	Notes
M&S	Modeling and simulation		DoD		
MATREX	Modeling Architecture for Technology, Research, and EXperimentation		STTC		
MBL	Maneuver Battle Lab		TRADOC		
MORS	Military Operations Research Society		MORS		
MOOTW	Military operations other than war		DoD		
MSRR	Modeling and Simulation Resource Repository		MSCO		
MSCO	Modeling and Simulation Coordination Office		DPP		
MTM	Model-Test-Model		DPP		

== N ==
Acronym/Term	Expansion	Definition	Authoritative source	Links	Notes
NATO	North Atlantic Treaty Organization		NATO		
Network Science			DoD		
NCS	National Center for Simulation		NCS		
NDIA	National Defense Industrial Association		NDIA		
NICEL	Navy Infrared Countermeasures Effectiveness Laboratory		Naval Surface Warfare Center Crane Division		
NMSG	NATO Modeling and Simulation Group		NATO		
NSRDEC	Natick Soldier Research, Development and Engineering Center		RDECOM		

== O ==
Acronym/Term	Expansion	Definition	Authoritative source	Links	Notes
OASA(ALT)	United States Office of the Assistant Secretary of the Army for Acquisition, Logistics, and Technology		HQDA		
ONS	Operational Needs Statement		AR 71–9		
OSD	Office of the Secretary of Defense		DoD		
OTM	On The Move		PM C4ISR OTM		

== P ==
Acronym/Term	Expansion	Definition	Authoritative source	Links	Notes
PA&E	Program Analysis and Evaluation		OSD		
PDM	Program Decision Memorandum		OSD		
PEO C3T	Program Executive Office Command, Control, Communications Tactical		SAAL-ZB		
PEO EIS	Program Executive Office Enterprise Information Systems		SAAL-ZB		
PEO GCS	Program Executive Office Ground Combat Systems		SAAL-ZB		
PEO STRI	Program Executive Office Simulation, Training, and Instrumentation		SAAL-ZB		
PM ACTT	Product Manager Air and Command Tactical Trainers		PEO CATT		
PM AKO/DKO	Project Manager Army Knowledge Online/Defense Knowledge Online		PEO EIS		
PM BC	Project Manager Battle Command		PEO C3T		
PM BCS3	Product Manager Battle Command Sustainment Support System		PM BC		
PM CATT	Project Manager Combined Arms Tactical Trainers		PEO STRI		
PM ConSim	Project Manager Constructive Simulation		PEO STRI		
PM FCS	Program Management Future Combat Systems		SAAL-ZB		
PM ITTS	Project Manager Instrumentation Targets and Threat Simulators		PEO STRI		
PoR	Program of Record		DAU		

== Q ==
Acronym/Term	Expansion	Definition	Authoritative source	Links	Notes
QRC	Quick Reaction Capability		DAU		

== R ==
Acronym/Term	Expansion	Definition	Authoritative source	Links	Notes
RDECOM	Research, Development and Engineering Command		AMC		

== S ==
Acronym/Term	Expansion	Definition	Authoritative source	Links	Notes
SAAL-ZB	Principal Military Deputy		OASA(ALT)		
SAAL-ZT	Deputy Assistant Secretary for Research & Technology		OASA(ALT)		
SASO	Stability And Support Operations		DoD		Currently known as Military Operations Other Than War (MOOTW)
SBA	Simulation Based Acquisition		DoD		
SE	Synthetic environment	Internetted simulations that represent activities at a high level of realism from simulations of theaters of war to factories and manufacturing processes. These environments may be created within a single computer or a vast distributed network connected by local and wide area networks and augmented by super-realistic special effects and accurate behavioral models. They allow visualization of and immersion into the environment being simulated.	DoD 5000.59-P CJCSI 8510.01		
SEDRIS	Synthetic Environment Data Representation and Interchange Specification		SISO		
SEI	Software Engineering Institute		CMU		
Sensor fusion			DoD		
SHME	Synthetic human-made environment			Synthetic human-made environment	
SIMPLE	The Standard Interface for Multiple Platform Link Evaluation	The aim of this agreement is to provide specifications for a common standard to interconnect ground rigs of all types (e.g. simulation, integration facilities etc.) for the purpose of Tactical Data Link (TDL) Interoperability (IO) testing.	NATO STANAG 5602		Enables transmission of J-Series (TADIL-J) messages over IP-based protocols
SISO	Simulation Interoperability Standards Organization		SISO		
SIW	Simulation Interoperability Workshop		SISO		
SID	System Integration Domain		RDECOM		
SMART	Simulation & Modeling for Acquisition, Requirements, and Training		DoA		
SNE	Synthetic natural environment		DARPA		
SPE	Synthetic psychological environment				
Static Terrain]			PM FCS		
Static Weather			PM FCS		
STOW	Synthetic Theater of War		DARPA		
STTC	United States Army Simulation and Training Technology Center		RDECOM		
Systems architecture		The fundamental organization of a system, embodied in its components, their relationships to each other and the environment, and the principles governing its design and evolution.	IEEE Std 1471–2000		
SWOT	Strengths, Weaknesses, Opportunities, and Threats			SWOT analysis	

== T ==
Acronym/Term	Expansion	Definition	Authoritative source	Links	Notes
TARDEC	Tank Automotive Research, Development and Engineering Center		RDECOM		
TFT	Technology Focus Teams		RDECOM		
TRADOC	Training and Doctrine Command		HQDA		

== U ==
Acronym/Term	Expansion	Definition	Authoritative source	Links	Notes
Urban Terrain			DoD		
USAASC	United States Army Acquisition Support Center		ASA(ALT)		
USD(AT&L)	Under Secretary of Defense for Acquisition, Technology and Logistics		DoD		

== V ==
Acronym/Term	Expansion	Definition	Authoritative source	Links	Notes

== W ==
Acronym/Term	Expansion	Definition	Authoritative source	Links	Notes
WSR	Weapon Systems Review	The WSR is the forum for Program Managers to present their life-cycle weapon system and equipment funding requirements for Program Evaluation Groups (PEG) integration. All PEGs and planning, programming, budget and execution (PPBE) integrators are invited to participate and it involves more than 15 Army Staff and Secretariat stakeholders.	United States Army Acquisition Support Center		

== X ==
Acronym/Term	Expansion	Definition	Authoritative source	Links	Notes

== Y ==
Acronym/Term	Expansion	Definition	Authoritative source	Links	Notes

== Z ==
Acronym/Term	Expansion	Definition	Authoritative source	Links	Notes

== See also ==
- Computer simulation
- Glossary of military abbreviations
- Military simulation
- Modeling and simulation
- Operations research
