= Dynamic terrain =

A dynamic terrain is the representation of terrain (e.g. mountains, hills, valleys) together with the capability for modification during a simulation (e.g. a constructive soldier (i.e. battlespace entity) digging a trench).

== Military simulation ==
Dynamic terrain has been supported in military training simulations since the mid-1990s in the Close Combat Tactical Trainer (CCTT), the first trainer in the Combined Arms Tactical Trainer (CATT) family of military training systems. At the time, the Institute for Simulation and Training (IST) at the University of Central Florida (UCF) had been researching the dynamic terrain requirements of networked military simulations, including excavation, clouds and other atmospheric events, and water flow. The complexity proposed by IST was computationally expensive and not practical for the technology available at that time. Therefore, CCTT implemented dynamic terrain events as dynamically placed features (DPFs) that described the terrain deformation, such as a tank ditch. Tank ditches are either 30, 60, 90, or 120 meters long and may be oriented in three dimensions. Since CCTT represents the terrain as an equally spaced elevation grid, terrain reasoning queries are adjusted based on the presence of a DPF. Nevertheless, the dynamic terrain implementation in CCTT caused a mismatch between the CCTT Semi-Automated Forces (SAF) and the visual display. The SAF reasons on the terrain and feature geometry, whereas the visual display focuses on presenting the terrain as a realistic scene. The difference between these two representations of the terrain is similar to the difference between feeling and seeing, therefore these representations store information in very different ways.

In the late 1990s, the Synthetic Theater of War (STOW) effort sponsored by the Defense Advanced Research Projects Agency (DARPA) provided the capability to communicate and apply terrain deformations but the implementation still required high-end platforms without satisfying real-time requirements. The Dynamic Terrain Simulator (DTSim) was developed for the STOW Synthetic Environments (SE) program at the United States Army Corps of Engineers Army Geospatial Center (ASG) (formerly Topographic Engineering Center (TEC)). Other applications reused the DTSim framework for more specific implementations of the dynamic terrain capabilities, for example RunwaySim, the Hydrogeologic Simulator (HydroSim), Dynamic Terrain Scribe (DTScribe), Dynamic Terrain Agent (DTAgent), and the Ultra-High Resolution Building Simulator (UHRB-Sim)

In 2003, the U.S.Army Research Laboratory (ARL) released documentation related to their Dynamic Terrain Server (DTServer). DTServer computes structural effects of detonations and collisions and transmits the result to client simulations, making sure that all simulators share a unified terrain database. DTServer also uses a table look-up to compute the effects of blasts and collisions. The DTServer provides terrain updates by issuing distributed interactive simulation (DIS) protocol data units (PDUs). DTServer sends DIS Set Data PDUs of the following types: Breach Subtract, Breach vertices, and Ding messages. DTServer also provides a graphical user interface (GUI) to inspect the state of the database. DTServer runs on three different databases: the terrain database, the object database, and the munitions database. The DIS interface has been successfully tested in the Soldier Visualization System (SVS), the After Action Review (AAR) system from IST, and the ARL DIS.

There are current efforts to include dynamic terrain capabilities in One Semi-Automated Forces (OneSAF). The OneSAF Environment Runtime Component (ERC) updates presented in the 2009 OneSAF Users Conference mention that OneSAF 4.0 will include support for terrain deformation such as craters, tank defilades, infantry trenches, and breach holes in walls. OneSAF's dynamic terrain implementation will use a server to resolve dynamic terrain requests. The U.S. Army Research, Development, and Engineering Command (RDECOM) Simulation and Training Technology Center (STTC) is sponsoring the development of the Shared Architecture for Dynamic Environment (SHADE). SHADE will provide a framework to receive events, calculate effects, and transmit dynamic environment changes to participating applications. These efforts will seek to address the dynamic terrain capability gap in modeling and simulation identified by the U.S. Army Training And Doctrine Command (TRADOC) Intelligence Support Activity (TRISA).

== See also ==
- Terrain deformation
- Synthetic environment
- Synthetic natural environment
- Synthetic human-made environment
- Glossary of military modeling and simulation
- DTED
- Topographic Engineering Center
- National Geospatial-Intelligence Agency
