= Live, virtual, and constructive =

Military terminology

Live, Virtual, & Constructive (LVC) Simulation is a broadly used taxonomy for classifying Modeling and Simulation (M&S). However, categorizing a simulation as a live, virtual, or constructive environment is problematic since there is no clear division among these categories. The degree of human participation in a simulation is infinitely variable, as is the degree of equipment realism. The categorization of simulations also lacks a category for simulated people working real equipment.

== Categories ==
The LVC categories as defined by the United States Department of Defense in the Modeling and Simulation Glossary as follows:

- Live - A simulation involving real people operating real systems. Military training events using real equipment are live simulations. They are considered simulations because they are not conducted against a live enemy.
- Virtual - A simulation involving real people operating simulated systems. Virtual simulations inject a Human-in-the-Loop into a central role by exercising motor control skills (e.g., flying jet or tank simulator), decision making skills (e.g., committing fire control resources to action), or communication skills (e.g., as members of a C4I team).
- Constructive - A simulation involving simulated people operating simulated systems. Real people stimulate (make inputs to) such simulations, but are not involved in determining the outcomes. A constructive simulation is a computer program. For example, a military user may input data instructing a unit to move and to engage an enemy target. The constructive simulation determines the speed of movement, the effect of the engagement with the enemy and any battle damage that may occur. These terms should not be confused with specific constructive models such as Computer Generated Forces (CGF), a generic term used to refer to computer representations of forces in simulations that attempts to model human behavior. CGF is just one example model being used in a constructive environment. There are many types of constructive models that involve simulated people operating simulated systems.

Other associated terms are as follows:

- LVC Enterprise - The overall enterprise of resources in which LVC activities take place.
- LVC Integration - The process of linking LVC simulations through a suitable technology or protocol to exploit simulation interoperability within a federated simulation environment such as the HLA or EuroSim.
- LVC Integrating Architecture (LVC-IA) - The aggregate representation of the foundational elements of a LVC Enterprise, including hardware, software, networks, databases and user interfaces, policies, agreements, certifications/accreditations and business rules. LVC-IA is intrinsically an Enterprise Architecture, given the system-of-systems environment it must support. LVC-IA bridges M&S technology to the people who need and use the information gained through simulation. To accomplish this a LVC-IA provides the following:
  - Integration through simulation equipment, interoperability tools and support personnel. See also Enterprise integration and Enterprise architecture. Integration creates network-centric linkages to collect, retrieve and exchange data among live instrumentation, virtual simulators and constructive simulations as well as between the joint military and specific service command systems. Integration also bridges together data management, exercise management, exercise collaboration and updating training support systems.
  - Interoperability through common protocols, specifications, standards and interfaces to standardize LVC components and tools for mission rehearsals and training, testing, acquisition, analysis, experimentation, and logistics planning.
  - Composability through common and reusable components and tools such as enterprise after action review, adapters, correlated terrain databases, Multilevel security for multinational players and hardware/software requirements.

Other definitions used in LVC discussions (Webster's dictionary)

1. Enterprise: a project or undertaking that is especially difficult, complicated, or risky
  - A: a unit of economic organization or activity; especially: a business organization
  - B: a systematic purposeful activity
2. Environment: The aggregate of surrounding things, conditions or influences; surroundings
3. Construct: To make or form by combining or arranging components
4. Component: One of the parts of something

Current and emerging technology to enable true LVC technology for Combat Air Forces ("CAF") training require standardized definitions of CAF LVC events to be debated and developed. The dictionary terms used above provide a solid foundation of understanding of the fundamental structure of the LVC topic as applied universally to DoD activities. The terms and use cases described below are a guidepost for doctrine that uses these terms to eliminate any misunderstanding. The following paragraph uses these terms to layout the global view, and will be explained in detail throughout the rest of the document. In short:

Training and Operational Test are conducted through the combined use of three separate Constructs (Live, Simulator and Ancillary) which are in turn made up of several enabling Components to prepare, test and/or train warfighters in their respective disciplines. The LVC Enterprise, a component of the Live construct, is the totality of personnel, hardware and software that enables warfighters to combine three historically disparate Environments (Live, Virtual and Constructive) to improve performance in their combat role.

Central to a functionally accurate understanding of the paragraph above is a working knowledge of the Environment definitions, provided below for clarity:

- Live Environment (L)*: Warfighters operating their respective disciplines’ operational system in a real-world application
- Virtual Environment (V)*: Warfighters operating fielded simulators or trainers
- Constructive Environment (C)*: Computer Generated Forces (CGFs) used to augment and force multiply Live and/or Virtual scenario development

The Environments (L, V, & C) by themselves are generally well understood and apply universally to a diverse range of disciplines such as the medical field, law enforcement or operational military applications. Using the medical field as an example, the Live Environment can be a doctor performing CPR on a human patient in a critical real world situation. In this same context, the Virtual Environment would include a doctor practicing CPR on a training mannequin, and the Constructive Environment is the software within the training mannequin that drives its behavior. In a second example, consider fighter pilot training or operational testing. The Live environment is the pilot flying the combat aircraft. The Virtual environment would include that same pilot flying a simulator. The constructive environment includes the networks, computer generated forces, and weapons servers, etc. that enable the Live and Virtual environments to be connected and interact. Although there are clearly secondary and tertiary training benefits, it is important to understand combining one or more environments for the purpose of making Live real world performance better is the sole reason the LVC concept was created. However, when referring to specific activities or programs designed to integrate the environments across the enterprise, the use and application of terms differ widely across the DoD. Therefore, the words that describe specifically how future training or operational testing will be accomplished require standardization as well. This is best described by backing away from technical terminology and thinking about how human beings actually prepare for their specific combat responsibilities. In practice, human beings prepare for their roles in one of three Constructs: Live (with actual combat tools), in a Simulator of some kind, or in other Ancillary ways (tests, academics, computer-based training, etc.). Actions within each of the Constructs are further broken down into Components that specify differing ways to get the job done or achieve training objectives. The three Constructs are described below:

== Live Construct ==
Live is one of three constructs representing humans operating their respective disciplines’ operational system. Operational system examples could consist of a tank, a naval vessel, an aircraft or eventually even a deployed surgical hospital. Three components of the Live Construct follow

- Live vs. Live: Traditional Live vs. Live training is a component of the Live Construct and occurs when Live operational systems interact with one another to augment scenario complexity (incidentally this is how actual combat is accomplished as well; making this component the most fully immersive form of combat training available today)
- LC: Live, Constructive is a component of the Live Construct whereby CGFs are injected into Live operational systems in a bi-directional, integrated, secure, dynamically adaptable network to augment scenario complexity
- LVC: Live, Virtual and Constructive (LVC) is a component of the Live Construct whereby Virtual entities and CGFs are injected into Live operational systems in an integrated, secure, dynamically adaptable network to augment scenario complexity

== Simulator Construct ==
The Simulator Construct is a combination of Virtual and Constructive (VC), and is composed of humans operating simulated devices in lieu of Live operational systems. The Simulator Construct consists of three components:

- A locally networked set of identical simulators typical of the environment (stand-alone simulators)
- A networked set of disparate simulators (Distributed Mission Operations (DMO))
- A locally closed-loop networked enclave of multiple simulator devices in support of High-End Testing, Tactics, and Advanced Training (HET3)

== Ancillary Construct ==
Is the third construct other than Live or Simulator whereby training is accomplished via many components (not all-inclusive)

- Computer-based instruction
- Self-study
- Platform instructed academics

Utilizing the definitions above, the following table provides a graphical representation of how the terms relate in the context of CAF Training or Operational Test:

Using the figure above as a guide, it is clear LVC activity is the use of the Virtual and Constructive environments to enhance scenario complexity for the Live environment – and nothing more. An LVC system must have a bi-directional, adaptable, ad-hoc and secure communication system between the Live environment and the VC environment. Most importantly, LVC used as a verb is an integrated interaction of the three environments with the Live environment always present. For example, a Simulator Construct VC event should be called something other than LVC (such as Distributed Mission Operations (DMO)). In the absence of the Live environment LVC and LC do not exist, making the use of the LVC term wholly inappropriate as a descriptor.

As the LVC Enterprise pertains to a training program, LVC lines of effort are rightly defined as “a collaboration of OSD, HAF, MAJCOM, Joint and Coalition efforts toward a technologically sound and fiscally responsible path for training to enable combat readiness.” The “lines of effort,” in this case, would not include Simulator Construct programs and development but would be limited to the Construct that includes the LVC Enterprise. The other common term, “Doing LVC” would then imply “readiness training conducted utilizing an integration of Virtual and Constructive assets for augmenting Live operational system scenarios and mission objective outcomes.” Likewise, LVC-Operational Training (in a CAF fighter training context) or “LVC-OT” are the tools and effort required to integrate Live, Virtual and Constructive mission systems, when needed, to tailor robust and cost-efficient methods of Operational Training and/or Test.

== Misused and extraneous terms ==
To ensure clarity of discussions and eliminate misunderstanding, when speaking in the LVC context, only the terms in this document should be used to describe the environments, constructs, and components. Words like “synthetic” and “digi” should be replaced with “Constructive” or “Virtual” instead. Additionally, Embedded Training (ET) systems, defined as a localized or self-contained Live/Constructive system (like on the F-22 or F-35) should not be confused with or referred to as LVC systems.

== History ==
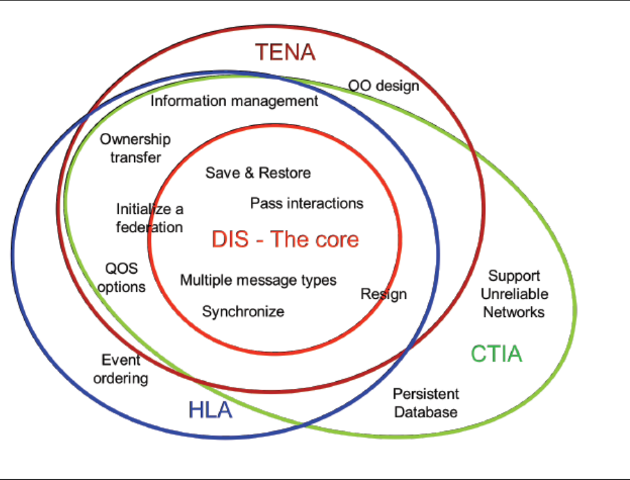
LVC Simulation Architectures Venn Diagram

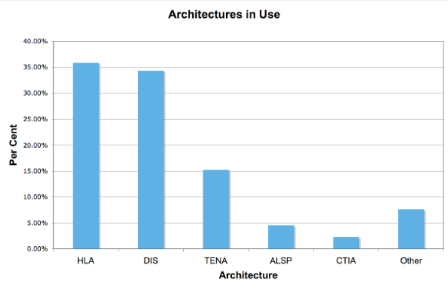
Usage Frequency of Simulation Architectures

Prior to 1990, the field of M&S was marked by fragmentation and limited coordination between activities across key communities. In recognition of these deficiencies, Congress directed the Department of Defense (DoD) to “... establish an Office of the Secretary of Defense (OSD) level joint program office for simulation to coordinate simulation policy, to establish interoperability standards and protocols, to promote simulation within the military departments, and to establish guidelines and objectives for coordination [sic] of simulation, wargaming, and training.” (ref Senate Authorization Committee Report, FY91, DoD Appropriations Bill, SR101-521, pp. 154–155, October 11, 1990) Consistent with this direction, the Defense Modeling and Simulation Office (DMSO) was created, and shortly afterwards many DoD Components designated organizations and/or points of contact to facilitate coordination of M&S activities within and across their communities. For over a decade, the ultimate goal of the DoD in M&S is to create a LVC-IA to assemble models and simulations quickly, which create an operationally valid LVC environment to train, develop doctrine and tactics, formulate operational plans and assess warfighting situations. A common use of these LVC environments will promote closer interaction between operations and acquisition communities. These M&S environments will be constructed from composeable components interoperating through an integrated architecture. A robust M&S capability enables the DOD to meet operational and support objectives effectively across the diverse activities of the military services, combatant commands and agencies.

The number of available architectures have increased over time. M&S trends indicate that once a community of use develops around an architecture, that architecture is likely to be used regardless of new architectural developments. M&S trends also indicate that few, if any, architectures will be retired as new ones come online. When a new architecture is created to replace one or more of the existing set, the likely outcome is one more architecture will be added to the available set. As the number of mixed-architecture events increase over time, the inter-architecture communication problem increases as well.

M&S has made significant progress in enabling users to link critical resources through distributed architectures.

In the mid 1980s, SIMNET became the first successful implementation of a large-scale, real-time, man-in-the-loop simulator networking for team training and mission rehearsal in military operations. The earliest successes that came through the SIMNET program was the demonstration that geographically dispersed simulation systems could support distributed training by interacting with each other across network connections.

The Aggregate Level Simulation Protocol (ALSP) extended the benefits of distributed simulation to the force-level training community so that different aggregate-level simulations could cooperate to provide theater-level experiences for battle-staff training. The ALSP has supported an evolving “confederation of models” since 1992, consisting of a collection of infrastructure software and protocols for both inter-model communication through a common interface and time advance using a conservative Chandy-Misra-based algorithm.

At about the same time, the SIMNET protocol evolved and matured into the Distributed Interactive Simulation (DIS) Standard. DIS allowed an increased number of simulation types to interact in distributed events, but was primarily focused on the platform-level training community. DIS provided an open network protocol standard for linking real-time platform-level wargaming simulations.

In the mid 1990s, the Defense Modeling and Simulation Office (DMSO) sponsored the High Level Architecture (HLA) initiative. Designed to support and supplant both DIS and ALSP, investigation efforts were started to prototype an infrastructure capable of supporting these two disparate applications. The intent was to combine the best features of DIS and ALSP into a single architecture that could also support uses in the analysis and acquisition communities while continuing to support training applications.

The DoD test community started development of alternate architectures based on their perception that HLA yielded unacceptable performance and included reliability limitations. The real-time test range community started development of the Test and Training Enabling Architecture (TENA) to provide low-latency, high-performance service in the hard-real-time application of integrating live assets in the test-range setting. TENA, through its common infrastructure, including the TENA Middleware and other complementary architecture components, such as the TENA Repository, Logical Range Archive, and other TENA utilities and tools, provides the architecture and software implementation and capabilities necessary to quickly and economically enable interchangeability among range systems, facilities, and simulations.

Similarly, the U.S. Army started the development of the Common Training Instrumentation Architecture (CTIA) to link a large number of live assets requiring a relatively narrowly bounded set of data for purposes of providing After Action Reviews (AARs) on Army training ranges in the support of large-scale exercises.

Other efforts that make the LVC architecture space more complex include universal interchangeability software packages such as OSAMS or CONDOR developed and distributed by commercial vendors.

As of 2010 all of the DoD architectures remain in service with the exception of SIMNET. Of the remaining architectures: CTIA, DIS, HLA, ALSP and TENA, some are in early and growing use (e.g., CTIA, TENA) while others have seen a user-base reduction (e.g., ALSP). Each of the architectures is providing an acceptable level of capability within the areas where they have been adopted. However, DIS, HLA, TENA, and CTIA-based federations are not inherently interoperable with each other. when simulations rely on different architectures, additional steps must be taken to ensure effective communication between all applications. These additional steps, typically involving interposing gateways or bridges between the various architectures, may introduce increased risk, complexity, cost, level of effort, and preparation time. Additional problems extend beyond the implementation of individual simulation events. As a single example, the ability to reuse supporting models, personnel (expertise), and applications across the different protocols is limited. The limited inherent interoperability between the different protocols introduces a significant and unnecessary barrier to the integration of live, virtual, and constructive simulations.

== Challenges ==
The current status of LVC interoperability is fragile and subject to several reoccurring problems that must be resolved (often anew) whenever live, virtual or constructive simulation systems are to be components in a mixed-architecture simulation event. Some of the attendant problems stem from simulation system capability limitations and other system-to-system incompatibilities. Other types of problems arise from the general failure to provide a framework which achieves a more complete semantic-level interoperability between disparate systems. Interoperability, Integration and Composeablity have been identified as the most technical challenging aspects of a LVC-IA since at least 1996. The Study on the Effectiveness of Modeling and Simulation in the Weapon System Acquisition Process identified cultural and managerial challenges as well. By definition a LVC-IA is a socialtechnical system, a technical system that interacts directly with people. The following table identifies the 1996 challenges associated with the technical, cultural and managerial aspects. In addition, the challenges or gaps found in a 2009 study are also included. The table shows there is little difference between the challenges of 1996 and the challenges of 2009.

Type	1996 Challenges	2009 Challenges
Technical	Interoperability; Data Description Availability; Data Security and Sensitivity; Physics-based M&S; Hardware and Software Limitations; Variable Resolution	Interoperability; Data Discovery; Security; Representative, Composeable and Validated Models; Fault Monitoring and Persistence; Fidelity, Scale and Resolution filters
Cultural	Acquisition Process; Incentives for M&S use; M&S workforce (Training and Access); Acceptance of M&S	Process Tools; Communities of Practice; Workforce Training and Collaboration; Infrastructure
Managerial	Office of Secretary Defense Guidance; Ownership of Data and Models; VV&A; Funding Process; Use of System Model	Governance, Standards Policies; Data & Model Mediation; VV&A; Consistent Funding; Efficient Use and Best Practices

== Approaches to a solution ==
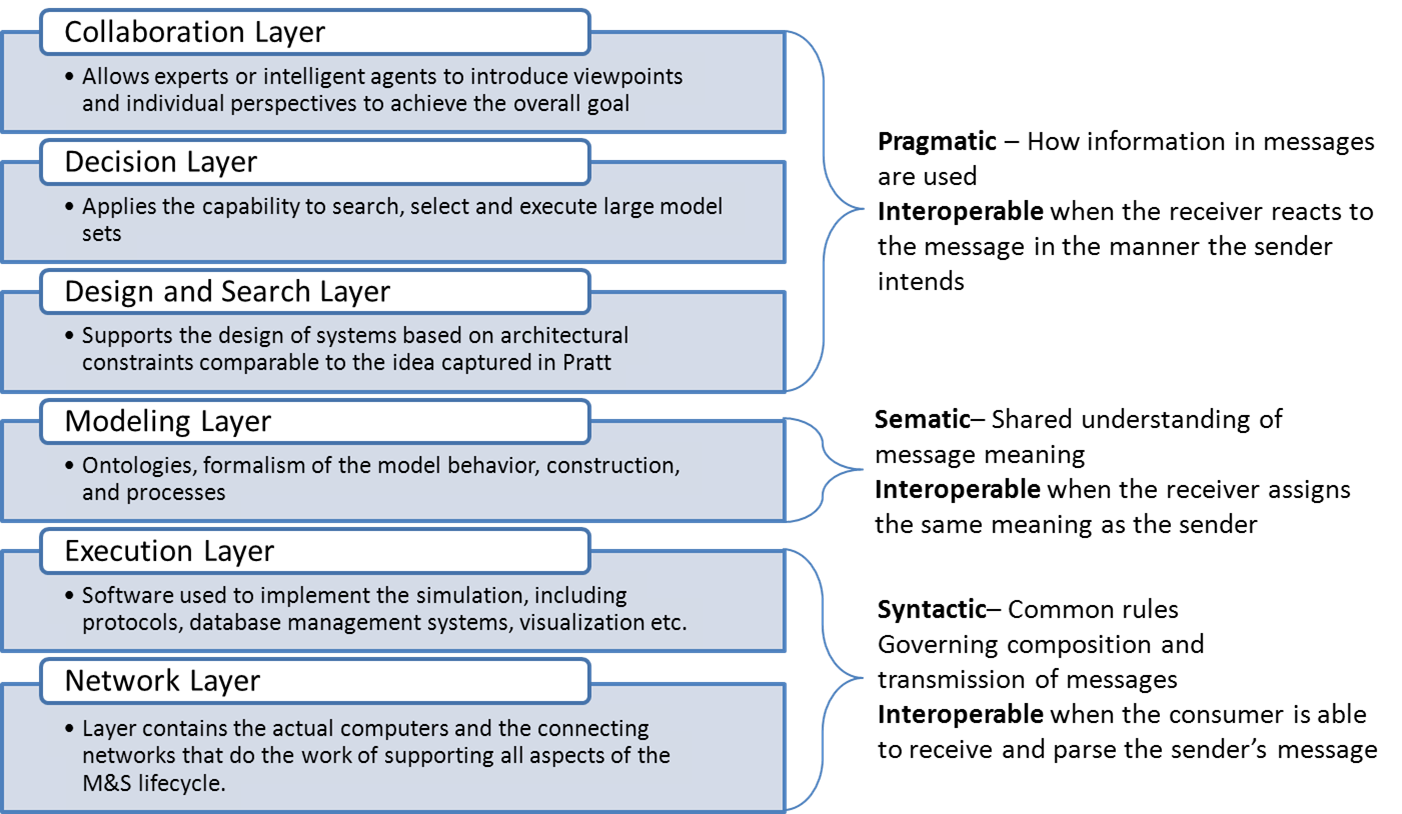
Ziegler's Architecture for Modeling and Simulation

M&S in the JCID process

A virtual or constructive model usually focuses on the fidelity or accuracy of the element being represented. A live simulation, by definition represents the highest fidelity, since it is reality. But a simulation quickly becomes more difficult when it is created from various live, virtual and constructive elements, or sets of simulations with various network protocols, where each simulation consists of a set of live, virtual and constructive elements. The LVC simulations are socialtechical systems due to the interaction between people and technology in the simulation. The users represent stakeholders from across the acquisition, analysis, testing, training, planning and experimentation communities. M&S occurs across the entire Joint Capabilities Integration Development System (JCID) lifecycle. See the "M&S in the JCID Process" figure. A LVC-IA is also considered an Ultra Large Scale (ULS) system due to the use by a wide variety of stakeholders with conflicting needs and the continuously evolving construction from heterogeneous parts. By definition, people are not just users but elements of a LVC simulation.

During the development of various LVC-IA environments, attempts to understand the foundational elements of integration, composability and interoperability emerged. As of 2010, our understanding of these three elements are still evolving, just as software development continues to evolve. Consider software architecture; as a concept it was first identified in the research work of Edsger Dijkstra in 1968 and David Parnas in the early 1970s. The area of software architecture was only recently adopted in 2007 by ISO as ISO/IEC 42010:2007. Integration is routinely described using the methods of architectural and software patterns. The functional elements of integration can be understood due to universality of integration patterns, e.g. Mediation (intra-communication) and Federation (inter-communication); process, data synchronization and concurrency patterns.

A LVC-IA is dependent on the Interoperability and Composability attributes, not just the technical aspects, but the social or cultural aspects as well. There are sociotechnical challenges, as well as ULS system challenges associated with these features. An example of a cultural aspect is the problem of composition validity. In an ULS the ability to control all interfaces to ensure a valid composition is extremely difficult. The VV&A paradigms are challenged to identify a level of acceptable validity.

=== Interoperability ===
The study of interoperability concerns methodologies to interoperate different systems distributed over a network system. Andreas Tolk introduced the Levels of Conceptual Interoperability Model (LCIM) which identified seven levels of interoperability among participating systems as a method to describe technical interoperability and the complexity of interoperations.

Bernard Zeigler's Theory of Modeling and Simulation extends on the three basic levels of interoperability:

- Pragmatic
- Semantic
- Syntactic

The pragmatic level focuses on the receiver’s interpretation of messages in the context of application relative to the sender’s intent. The semantic level concerns definitions and attributes of terms and how they are combined to provide shared meaning to messages. The syntactic level focuses on a structure of messages and adherence to the rules governing that structure. The linguistic interoperability concept supports simultaneous testing environment at multiple levels.

The LCIM associate the lower layers with the problems of simulation interoperation while the upper layers relate to the problems of reuse and composition of models. They conclude “simulation systems are based on models and their assumptions and constraints. If two simulation systems are combined, these assumptions and constraints must be aligned accordingly to ensure meaningful results”. This suggests that levels of interoperability that have been identified in the area of M&S can serve as guidelines to discussion of information exchange in general.

The Zeigler Architecture provides an architecture description language or conceptual model in which to discuss M&S. The LCIM provides a conceptual model as a means to discuss integration, interoperability and composability. The three linguistic elements relates the LCIM to the Zeigler conceptual model. Architectural and structural complexity are an area of research in systems theory to measure the cohesion and coupling and is based on the metrics commonly used in software development projects. Zeigler, Kim, and Praehofer present a theory of modeling and simulation which provides a conceptual framework and an associated computational approach to methodological problems in M&S. The framework provides a set of entities and relations among the entities that, in effect, present an ontology of the M&S domain.

=== Composability ===
Petty and Weisel formulated the current working definition: "Composability is the capability to select and assemble simulation components in various combinations into simulation systems to satisfy specific user requirements." Both a technical and user interaction is required indicative of a sociotechnical system is involved. The ability for a user to access data or access models is an important factor when considering composability metrics. If the user does not have visibility into a repository of models, the aggregation of models becomes problematic.

In Improving the Composability of Department of Defense Models and Simulation, the factors associated with the ability to provide composability are as follows:

- The complexity of the system being modeled. The size (complexity) of the M&S environment.
- The difficulty of the objective for the context in which the composite M&S will be used. The flexibility of exploration, extensibility.
- The strength of underlying science and technology, including standards.
- Human considerations, such as the quality of management, having a common community of interest, and the skill and knowledge of the work force.

Tolk introduced an alternative view on Composability, focusing more on the need for conceptual alignment:

The M&S community understands interoperability quite well as the ability to exchange information and to use the data exchanged in the receiving system. Interoperability can be engineered into a system or a service after definition and implementation. ...

Composability is different from interoperability. Composability is the consistent representation of truth in all participating systems. It extends the ideas of interoperability by adding the pragmatic level to cover what happens within the receiving system based on the received information. In contrast to interoperability, composability cannot be engineered into a system after the fact. Composability requires often significant changes to the simulation.

In other words: Propertied concepts, if they are modeled in more than one participating system, have to represent the same truth. It is not allowed for composable systems to gain different answer to the same question in both systems. The requirement for consistent representation of truth supersedes the requirement for meaningful use of received information known from interoperability.

=== LVC requires integratability, interoperability, and composability ===
Page et al. suggest defining integratability contending with the physical/technical realms of connections between systems, which include hardware and firmware, protocols, networks, etc., interoperability contending with the software and implementation details of interoperations; this includes exchange of data elements via interfaces, the use of middleware, mapping to common information exchange models, etc., and composability contending with the alignment of issues on the modeling level. As captured, among others, by Tolk, successful interoperation of solutions of LVC components requires integratability of infrastructures, interoperability of systems, and composability of models. LVC Architectures must holistically address all three aspects in well aligned systemic approaches.

== Economic drivers ==
To produce the greatest impact from its investments, the DoD needs to manage its M&S programs utilizing an enterprise-type approach. This includes both identifying gaps in M&S capabilities that are common across the enterprise and providing seed moneys to fund projects that have widely applicable payoffs, and conducting M&S investment across the Department in ways that are systematic and transparent. In particular, “Management processes for models, simulations, and data that … Facilitate the cost effective and efficient development of M&S systems and capabilities….” such as are cited in the vision statement require comprehensive Departmental M&S best-practice investment strategies and processes. M&S investment management requires metrics, both for quantifying the extent of potential investments and for identifying and understanding the full range of benefits resulting from these investments. There is at this time no consistent guidance for such practice.

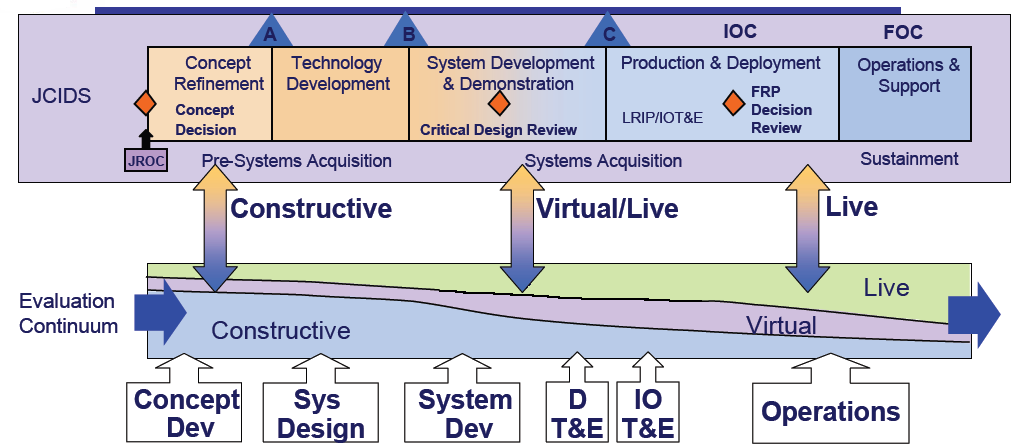
LVC Continuum

The development & use costs associated with LVC can be summarized as follows:

- Live - Relatively high cost since it is very human resource/materiel intensive and not particularly repeatable.
- Virtual - Relatively medium cost since it is less human resource/materiel intensive, some reuse can occur, and repeatability is moderate.
- Constructive - Relatively low cost since it is the least human resource/materiel intensive, reuse is high, and repeatability is high.

In contrast, the fidelity of M&S is highest in Live, lower in Virtual, and lowest in Constructive. As such, DoD policy is a mixed use of LVC through the Military Acquisition life cycle, also known as the LVC Continuum. In the LVC Continuum figure to the right, the JCIDS process is related to the relative use of LVC through the Military Acquisition life cycle.

== See also ==
- Simulation Based Acquisition
