= MSCO =

MSCO is an acronym that can mean either:

- Military Sealift Command Office
- Modeling and Simulation Coordination Office
- Murmansk Shipping Company
- My Summer Car Online
- A US Navy hull classification symbol: Minesweeper, coastal (Old) (MSC(O)), later (MSCO)
