= Lilt (company) =

American company

LILT
- Industry: Translation
- Genre: Artificial intelligence
- Founded: March 6, 2015; 11 years ago in Emeryville, California, United States
- Founders: Spence Green; John DeNero
- Headquarters: Emeryville, California, United States
- Area served: Worldwide
- Website: www.lilt.com

LILT is an American multinational company based in Emeryville, California that provides computer-assisted translation software employing artificial intelligence, in more than 70 languages.

== History ==
LILT was founded in 2015 by Spence Green and John DeNero. The company executes text, digital, audio, and video translations. Unlike other translation platforms and software, LILT uses a "human-in-the-loop" system, where a human translator can modify a word when he/she encounters it.

It helped for translation and early warning during Hurricane Fiona and Hurricane Ian. In addition, LILT intends to extend its services for early warning products related to disaster management and early warning systems.
