= SHME =

SHME or shme may refer to:

- Shanghai Metal Exchange
- Synthetic human-made environment
- shme, a metasyntactic variable
