= Synthetic natural environment =

A Synthetic Natural Environment (SNE) is the representation in a synthetic environment of the physical world within which all models of military systems exist and interact (i.e. climate, weather, terrain, oceans, space, etc.). It includes both data and models representing the elements of the environment, their effects on military systems, and models of the impact of military systems on environmental variables (e.g. contrails, dust clouds from moving vehicles, spoil from combat engineering).

== History ==
The term SNE was born out of Defense Advanced Research Projects Agency (DARPA)'s Synthetic Theater of War "Advanced Concept Technology Demonstration," ca. 1998.

== Evolution ==
Although SNE was meant to include cultural features (see Synthetic human-made environment) (e.g. buildings, bridges, roads) since its conception, the word "natural" in SNE made the term confusing. Furthermore, the original term SNE was not meant to include cultural factors (see Synthetic psychological environment).

== See also ==
- Modeling and simulation
- Glossary of military modeling and simulation
