= Test and Training Enabling Architecture =

Test and Training Enabling Architecture (TENA) is an architecture designed to bring interoperability to United States Department of Defense test and training systems. TENA is designed to promote integrated testing and simulation-based acquisition through the use of a large-scale, distributed, real-time synthetic environment, which integrates testing, training, simulation, and high-performance computing technologies, distributed across many facilities, using a common architecture.

The purpose of TENA is to provide the architecture and the software implementation necessary to

- Enable Interoperability among Range systems, Facilities, Simulations, C4ISR systems in a quick, cost-efficient manner,
- Foster Reuse for Range asset utilization and for future developments
- Provide Composability to rapidly assemble, initialize, test, and execute a system from a pool of reusable, interoperable elements

== Overview ==
TENA recognizes five basic categories of software:

1. TENA Applications (Range Resource Applications and TENA Tools) – Range Resource Applications are range instrumentation or processing systems (software applications) built to be compliant with TENA and are the heart of any TENA execution. TENA Tools are generally reusable TENA applications, stored in the repository and made available to the community, that help facilitate the management of a logical range through the entire range event lifecycle.
2. Non-TENA Applications – range instrumentation/processing systems, systems-under-test, simulations, and C4ISR systems not built in accordance with TENA but needed for a test or training event.
3. The TENA Common Infrastructure – those software subsystems that provide the foundation for achieving TENA’s goals and driving requirements. These include the TENA Repository, as a means for storing applications, object models, and other information between logical ranges; the TENA Middleware, for real-time information exchange; and the Event Data Management System, for storing scenario data, data collected during an event, and summary information.
4. The TENA Object Models – the common language used for communication between all range resources and tools. The set of objects used in a logical range is called the “logical range object model (LROM)” and may contain TENA standard object definitions as well as non-standard (user-defined) object definitions.
5. TENA Utilities – applications specifically designed to address issues related to usability or management of the TENA logical range.

JDAT displays TENA data on Joint Windows based Warfare Assessment Mode (JWinWAM).

== License ==
The TENA software was developed for use by the United States Government with unlimited rights. The software is provided freely for the purpose of promoting interoperability among United States Department of Defense systems. There are no International Traffic in Arms Regulations (ITAR) or export restrictions in using the TENA middleware and related TENA products at an international site, although any restrictions for user provided object models, software, or documents are the responsibility of the author(s) of those products. Use of the TENA software (source code and binary code) by individuals is permitted only upon acceptance of license.

== See also ==
TENA official website
