= Model–test–model =

Process of developing models of combat

Model–test–model (MTM) is a process that intends to use high-fidelity/high-resolution combat models to simulate and replicate field operational tests. The MTM Process is divided into 5 phases:

- Long-term planning – Identify the responsibility among interested organizations
- Pretest modeling – Modeler creates a model of a subject under test
- Field test – Modeler performs data gathering of subject under test
- Post-test modeling – Subject under test model input parameters are matched with subject under test–field–test output values
- Model validation/accreditation – Modeler provides sufficient evidence to a tester that a simulation adequately replicates field testing

== See also ==
- Simulation-based acquisition
- United States Army Test and Evaluation Command
- United States Army Materiel Systems Analysis Activity
