= Sedris =

SEDRIS (Synthetic Environment Data Representation and Interchange Specification) is an international data coding standard infrastructure technology created to represent environmental data in virtual environments. Environmental data represented by SEDRIS may be concrete, such as trees and mountains, or abstract, such as the behavior of light. The infrastructure frees users to place their focus on application development and also facilitates the exchange of data for reuse and wider scrutiny. Research into shared ways to represent environmental data was begun in the 1980s in order to permit distributed simulations to work together. SEDRIS was launched in 1994 by program managers of the United States Army's Simulation Training and Instrumentation Command and the US Department of Defense's Defense Advanced Research Projects Agency.

== Standardization ==
SEDRIS has led to forming the series standards of

- ISO/IEC 18023:2006(E) Information technology - SEDRIS
  - ISO/IEC 18023-1:2006(E) Information technology - SEDRIS - Part 1: Functional specification
  - ISO/IEC 18023-2:2006(E) Information technology - SEDRIS - Part 2: Abstract transmittal format
  - ISO/IEC 18023-3:2006(E) Information technology - SEDRIS - Part 3: Transmittal format binary encoding
- ISO/IEC 18024-4:2006(E) Information technology - SEDRIS language bindings - Part 4: C
- ISO/IEC 18025:2005(E) Information technology - Environmental Data Coding Specification (EDCS)
- ISO/IEC 18026:2006(E) Information technology - Spatial Reference Model (SRM)
- ISO/IEC 18041-4:2005(E) Information technology - EDCS language bindings - Part 4: C
- ISO/IEC 18042-4:2006(E) Information technology - Spatial Reference Model (SRM) language bindings - Part 4: C

== See also ==
- 3D Computer Graphics
- Environmental management system
- Geographic information system
- Glossary of Military Modeling & Simulation
- Environment
- Simulation Interoperability Standards Organization
