= Wilbur B. Payne =

US army veteran in WW II serving in the Italian campaign

Wilbur B. Payne (November 29, 1926 - August 17, 1990) was a pioneer in Army operations research and the preeminent leader in the field for more than three decades. He was a US Army veteran of World War II, serving in the Italian campaign. He received a Bachelor of Science in physics from Tulane University in 1951, a Master of Science in Physics in 1953 and a Doctor of Philosophy in Physics in 1955, both from Louisiana State University.

Dr. Payne served as a research analyst, Operations Research Office, Johns Hopkins University from 1955 to 1957; Associate Professor of Physics at the Virginia Polytechnic Institute from 1957 to 1960; Senior Analyst for the Research Analysis Corporation from 1961 to 1962; Staff Analyst in the Office of the Assistant Secretary of Defense from 1962 to 1964; Special Assistant for Operations Research, Office of the Assistant Secretary of the Army for Financial Management from 1964 to 1968; the first Deputy Under Secretary of the Army for Operations Research from 1968 to 1975; and the first Director of the Systems Analysis Activity of the US Army Training and Doctrine Command from 1975 to 1986.

Dr. Payne’s numerous awards include the presidential Rank of Meritorious Executive, the Department of Defense Medal for Distinguished Civilian Service and the Department of the Army Medal for Exceptional Civilian Service which he was awarded six times. He was a Wanner Medal Laureate and a Fellow of the Military Operations Research Society and was decorated with the Defense Meritorious Cross in Gold of the Armed Forces of the Federal Republic of Germany.

Throughout his career, Dr. Payne was an enthusiastic advocate for applying methods of science to practical defense decision making, enforcing the highest standards of professionalism, and nurturing and mentoring operations research analysts. He also enjoyed an international reputation throughout the operational research establishments of the armies of US allies. In 1972 Dr. Payne inspired the creation of the US Army Concepts Analysis Agency which in 1998 was designated the Center for Army Analysis.

In 1990, the Department of the Army Systems Analysis Award became the Dr. Wilbur B. Payne Memorial Award for Excellence in Analysis in order to honor the memory and contributions of Dr. Payne to the Operations Research field.

On May 28, 1999 the Dr. Wilbur B. Payne Memorial Hall was dedicated at Fort Belvoir, Virginia as the home of the Center for Army Analysis.
