= Destructible environment =

Feature of video games

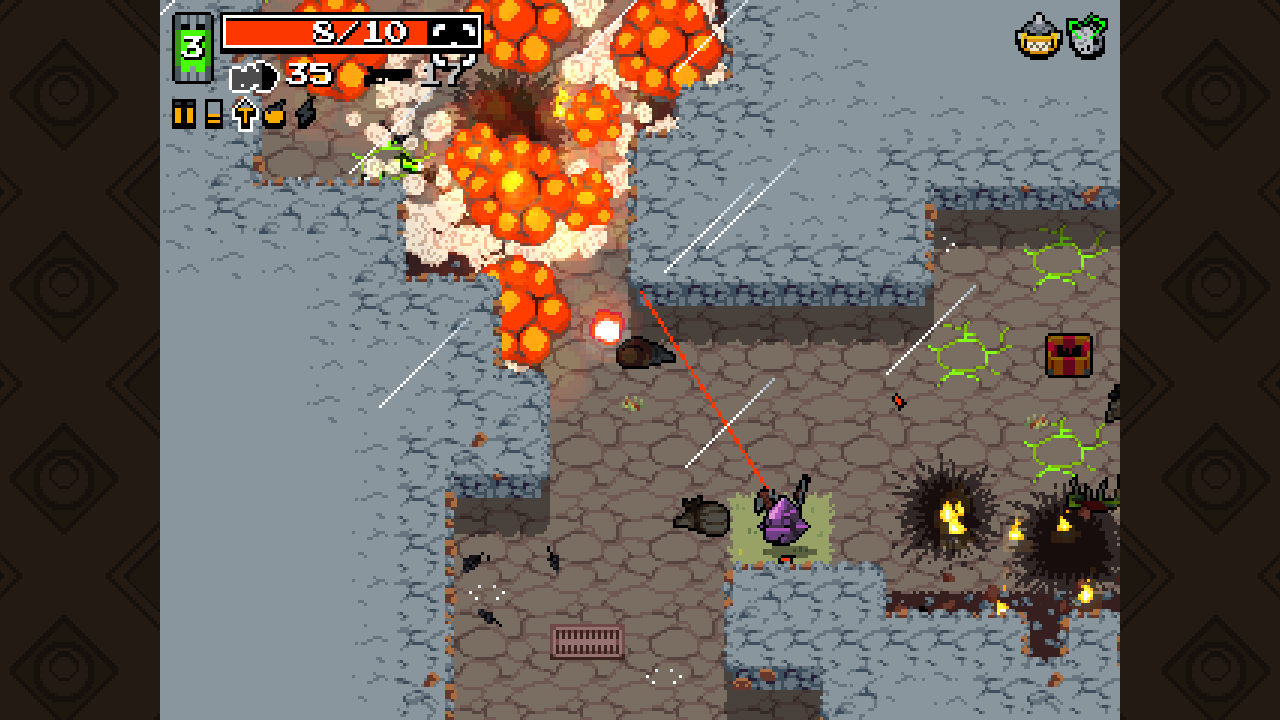
An explosion destroying some walls in Nuclear Throne

In video games, destructible environments or deformable terrains are environments that can be destroyed by the player. It may refer to any part of the environment, including terrain, buildings and other man-made structures. A game may feature destructible environments to demonstrate its graphical prowess, underscore the potency of the player character's given abilities, and/or require the player to leverage them to solve problems or discover new paths and/or secrets.

== History ==
Early examples include the Taito shooter games Gun Fight (1975) and Space Invaders (1978), where the players could take cover behind destructible objects. An early example of a fully destructible environment can be found in Namco's 1982 game Dig Dug, in which the whole of each level is destructible, though enemies can usually only follow the player through a combination of pre-made tracks and paths made by the player. A similar game released that same year was Mr. Do! by Universal. In most games that feature destructible terrain, it is more common for only part of the environment to be destructible to prevent players from cutting their way directly to the goal.

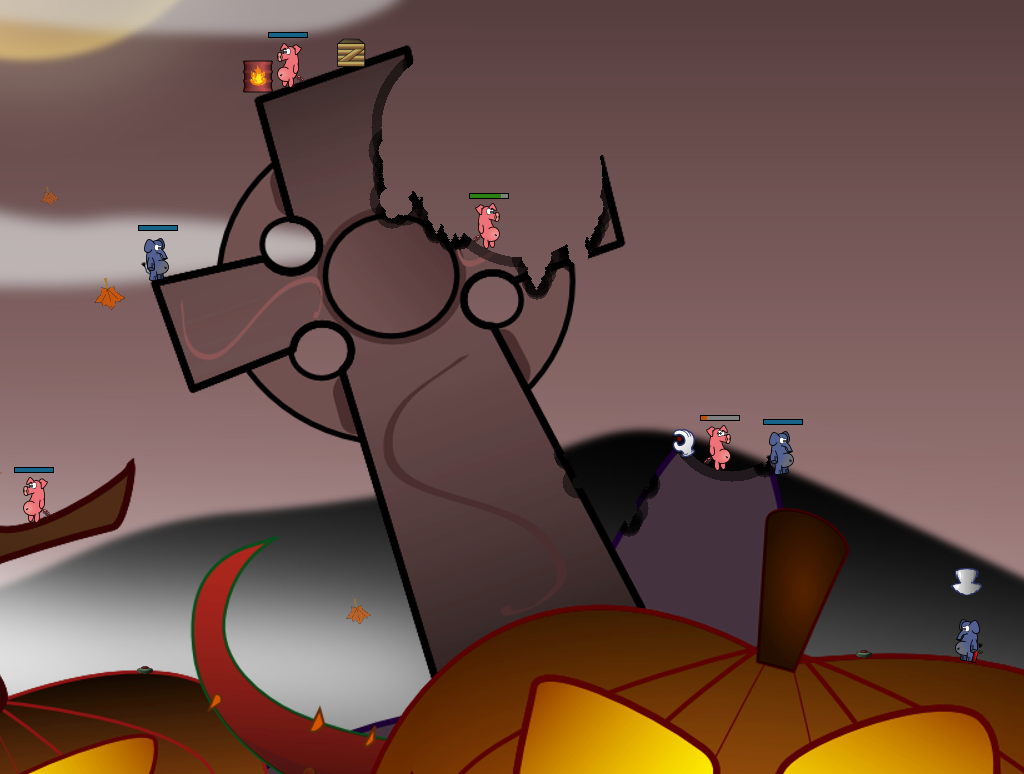
Destroyed terrain in the Worms-style game Warmux

An early example of a shooter game that featured fully destructible environments was Kagirinaki Tatakai, an early run and gun shooter developed by Hiroshi Ishikawa for the Sharp X1 computer and released by Enix in 1983. The Worms series, starting in 1995, also features terrain which can be completely obliterated.

The earliest first-person shooter example may be Ghen War, released in 1995 for the Sega Saturn, which featured a 3D terrain map generator that allows fully destructible environments. However, the trend to make more and more items and environmental features destroyable by the player hearkens back to the explosive barrels in Doom (1993). Games like Blood II: The Chosen (1998) also featured large numbers of destroyable objects; in that game a room filled with objects could be turned into an empty room filled only with debris.

In Minecraft, almost all naturally generated blocks can be mined and later placed elsewhere.

Released in 2001, Red Faction became one of the first three-dimentional games with significant destructible terrain. This was incorporated into the level design; for instance, the player can blow up the door instead of opening it or burrow into a wall for cover. The game's environment was intended to be fully destructible during development, but the destruction was reduced in scope due to technical constraints and the linearity of the game. Other 3D games with destructible terrain include Minecraft (2011) and its clones, Deep Rock Galactic (2020), Teardown (2022) and Donkey Kong Bananza (2025).

== See also ==
- Deformable body
- Dynamic terrain
- Terrain rendering
