= Paul Ray Smith =

United States Army Medal of Honor recipient

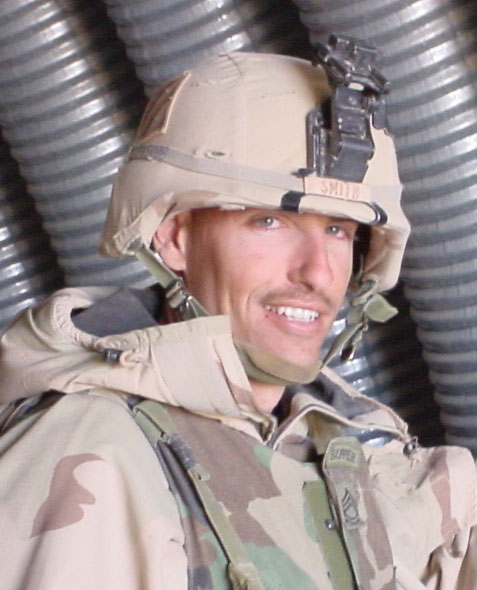
- Smith in 2003
- Born: September 24, 1969; El Paso, Texas, U.S.
- Died: April 4, 2003 (aged 33); Baghdad, Iraq
- Burial place: Arlington National Cemetery (cenotaph); Cremated; ashes in the Gulf of Mexico
- Military career
- Allegiance: United States
- Branch: United States Army
- Service years: 1989–2003
- Rank: Sergeant First Class
- Units: 11th Engineer Battalion, 3rd Infantry Division
- Conflicts: Gulf War; Yugoslav Wars; Bosnian War; Kosovo War; Iraq War; Invasion of Iraq †
- Awards: Medal of Honor; Bronze Star Medal; Purple Heart

Paul Ray Smith (September 24, 1969 – April 4, 2003) was a United States Army soldier who was posthumously awarded the Medal of Honor for his actions during the 2003 invasion of Iraq. While serving with B Company, 11th Engineer Battalion, 3rd Infantry Division in Baghdad, his team was attacked by a group of Iraqi soldiers and after a firefight he was killed by Iraqi fire. For his actions during this battle he was awarded the Medal of Honor. Two years later, the medal, along with the newly approved Medal of Honor flag, were presented to his family on behalf of him; specifically to his eleven-year-old son, at a White House ceremony by President George W. Bush.

== Early life and education ==
Smith was born on September 24, 1969, in El Paso, Texas, to Ivan Smith and Janice Pvirre, but when he was nine the family moved to Tampa, Florida. As a child he attended public schools and enjoyed sports, especially American football. He also liked riding skateboards and bicycles, playing pranks with his friends and younger sister Lisa. In high school he became interested in carpentry, even finding a part-time job as a carpenter's assistant. He also liked to work on cars, especially old ones, and enjoyed taking things apart to see how they worked, even restoring a dune buggy with a friend. In 1989 he graduated from Tampa Bay Vocational Tech High School and shortly thereafter joined the United States Army in October 1989.

== Military career ==
Smith attended Basic Training at Fort Leonard Wood, Missouri, in 1989, before being sent to Germany for his first duty station, where he joined the 9th Engineer Battalion. Later, he served during the Gulf War. He deployed with B company in October 1996 as part of the 2nd Brigade Combat Team, the covering force for Operation Joint Endeavor and Operation Joint Guardian; the battalion returned to Schweinfurt in April 1997. In 1999 he was posted to the 11th Engineer Battalion, with which he was deployed to Kosovo in May 2001, where he was responsible for daily presence patrols in the town of Gnjilane. In the spring of 2002, he received a promotion to sergeant first class and completed the Advanced Non-Commissioned Officer Course in August 2002.

As part of the 2003 invasion of Iraq, he was assigned to B Company, 11th Engineer Battalion of the 3rd Infantry Division.

=== Medal of Honor action ===
Smith's company was supporting the 2nd Battalion, 7th Infantry Regiment as it made its way through the Karbala Gap, across the Euphrates River and to Saddam International Airport (BIAP) in Baghdad. On April 4, 2003, a 100-man force was assigned to block the highway between Baghdad and the airport, about one mile east of the airport. After a brief battle, several of the Iraqis were captured. Smith spotted a walled enclosure nearby with a tower overlooking it. He and his squad set about building an impromptu enemy prisoner of war (EPW) holding area in the enclosure. Smith and 16 other men used an Armored Combat Earthmover (similar to a bulldozer) to knock a hole in the south wall of the courtyard. On the north side, there was a metal gate that Smith assigned several men to guard. These men noticed 50–100 Iraqi soldiers who had taken positions in trenches just beyond the gate. He summoned a Bradley Fighting Vehicle to attack their position. Three nearby M113 armored personnel carriers came to support the attack. An M113 was hit, possibly by a mortar, and all three crewmen were wounded. The Bradley, damaged and running low on ammunition, withdrew to reload during a lull in the battle. Smith organized the evacuation of the injured M113 crewmen. However, behind the courtyard was a military aid station crowded with 100 combat casualties. To protect it from being overrun, Smith chose to fight on rather than withdraw with the wounded.

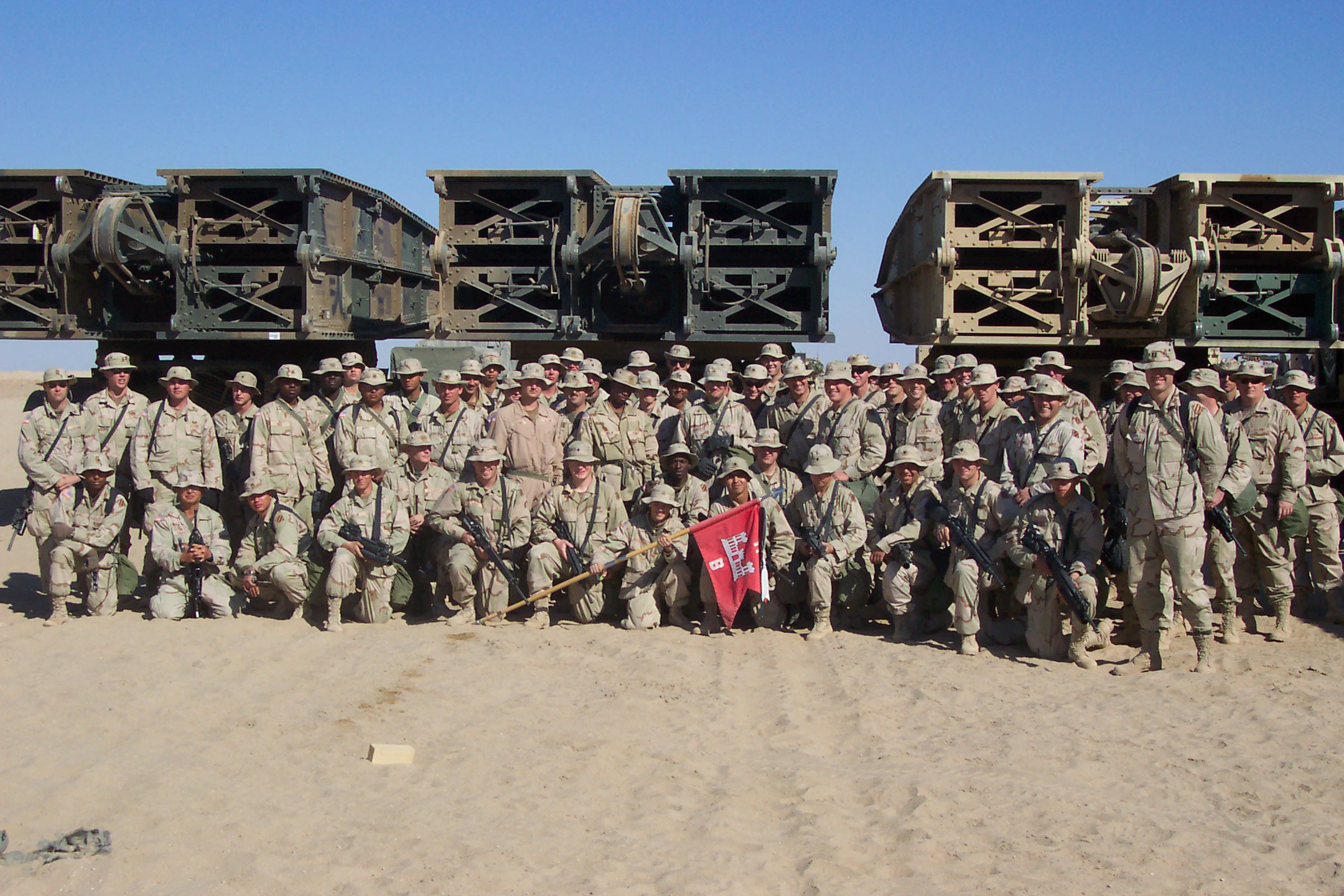
Smith's B Company, 11th Engineer Battalion, 3rd Infantry Division in 2005

Meanwhile, some Iraqi soldiers had taken position in the tower overlooking the courtyard, just over the west wall. The Iraqis now had the Americans in the courtyard under an intense crossfire. Smith took command of the M113 and ordered a driver to position it so that he could attack both the tower and the trenches. He manned the M113's machine gun, going through three boxes of ammunition. A separate team led by First Sergeant Tim Campbell attacked the tower from the rear, killing the Iraqis. As the battle ended, Smith's machine gun fell silent. His comrades found him slumped in the turret hatch. His armored vest was peppered with 13 bullet holes, the vest's ceramic armor inserts, both front and back, cracked in numerous places (the M113 he was manning was not fitted with protective ACAV gun shields which had been standard since the Vietnam War, later in the Iraq conflict, modern gunshields were fielded). However, the fatal shot, one of the last from the tower, had entered his neck and passed through his brain, killing him.

Before deploying to Iraq, Smith had written to his parents, saying "There are two ways to come home, stepping off the plane and being carried off the plane. It doesn't matter how I come home, because I am prepared to give all that I am to ensure that all my boys make it home." Smith was cremated and his ashes were scattered in the Gulf of Mexico, where he loved to fish.

He has a memorial marker in Arlington National Cemetery Arlington, Virginia, and his marker can be found in memorial Section MD, lot 67. He also has a memorial at his high school outside of the school's Navy Junior ROTC building.

At the time of his death Smith had served in the United States Army for thirteen years, and for his actions during the battle, he posthumously received the Medal of Honor. On April 4, 2005, exactly two years after he was killed, his eleven-year-old son David received the Medal of Honor on behalf of his father from President George W. Bush, along with a Medal of Honor flag.

== Personal life ==
Smith was married and had a son and a stepdaughter.

== Awards and decorations ==

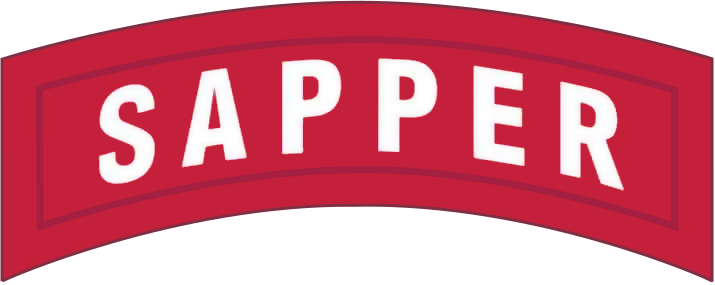
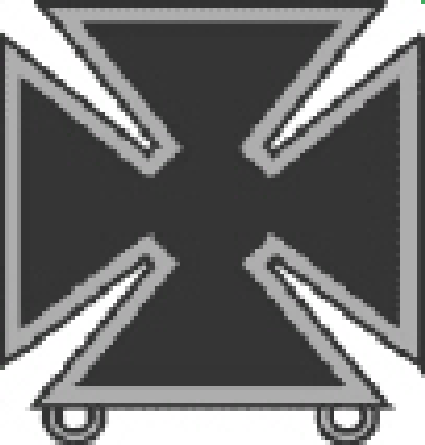

Right breast		Left breast		
Valorous Unit Award	Superior Unit Award	Combat Action Badge		
Valorous Unit Award	Superior Unit Award	Medal of Honor	Bronze Star	Purple Heart
Valorous Unit Award	Superior Unit Award	Army Commendation Medal with 4 bronze Oak leaf clusters (5 awards)	Army Achievement Medal with 1 silver Oak leaf cluster (6 awards)	Army Good Conduct Medal with 4 bronze Good conduct loops (4 awards)
Valorous Unit Award	Superior Unit Award	National Defense Service Medal with 1 Service star	Armed Forces Expeditionary Medal	Southwest Asia Service Medal with 3 campaign stars
Valorous Unit Award	Superior Unit Award	Global War on Terrorism Expeditionary Medal	Global War on Terrorism Service Medal	Armed Forces Service Medal
Valorous Unit Award	Superior Unit Award	NCO Professional Development Ribbon with award numeral 2	Army Service Ribbon	Army Overseas Service Ribbon with award numeral 3
Valorous Unit Award	Superior Unit Award	NATO Medal for ex-Yugoslavia	Kuwait Liberation Medal (Saudi Arabia)	Kuwait Liberation Medal (Kuwait)
Valorous Unit Award	Superior Unit Award	Sapper Tab		Marksmanship Badge with rifle component bar

- SFC Smith also earned the German Marksmanship Badge and French Armed Forces Commando Badge.

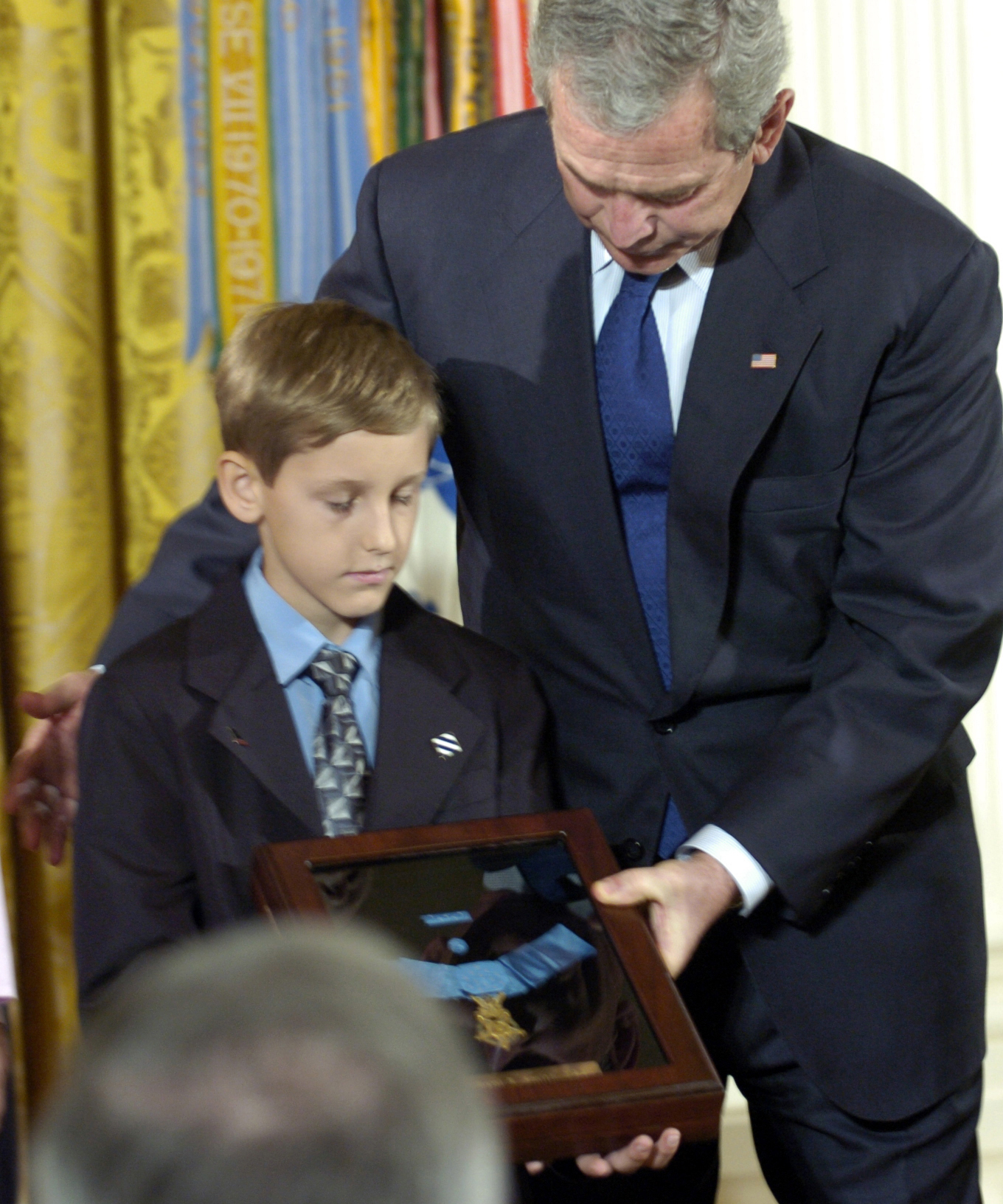
David Smith receives the Medal of Honor on behalf his father from President George W. Bush on April 4th, 2005.

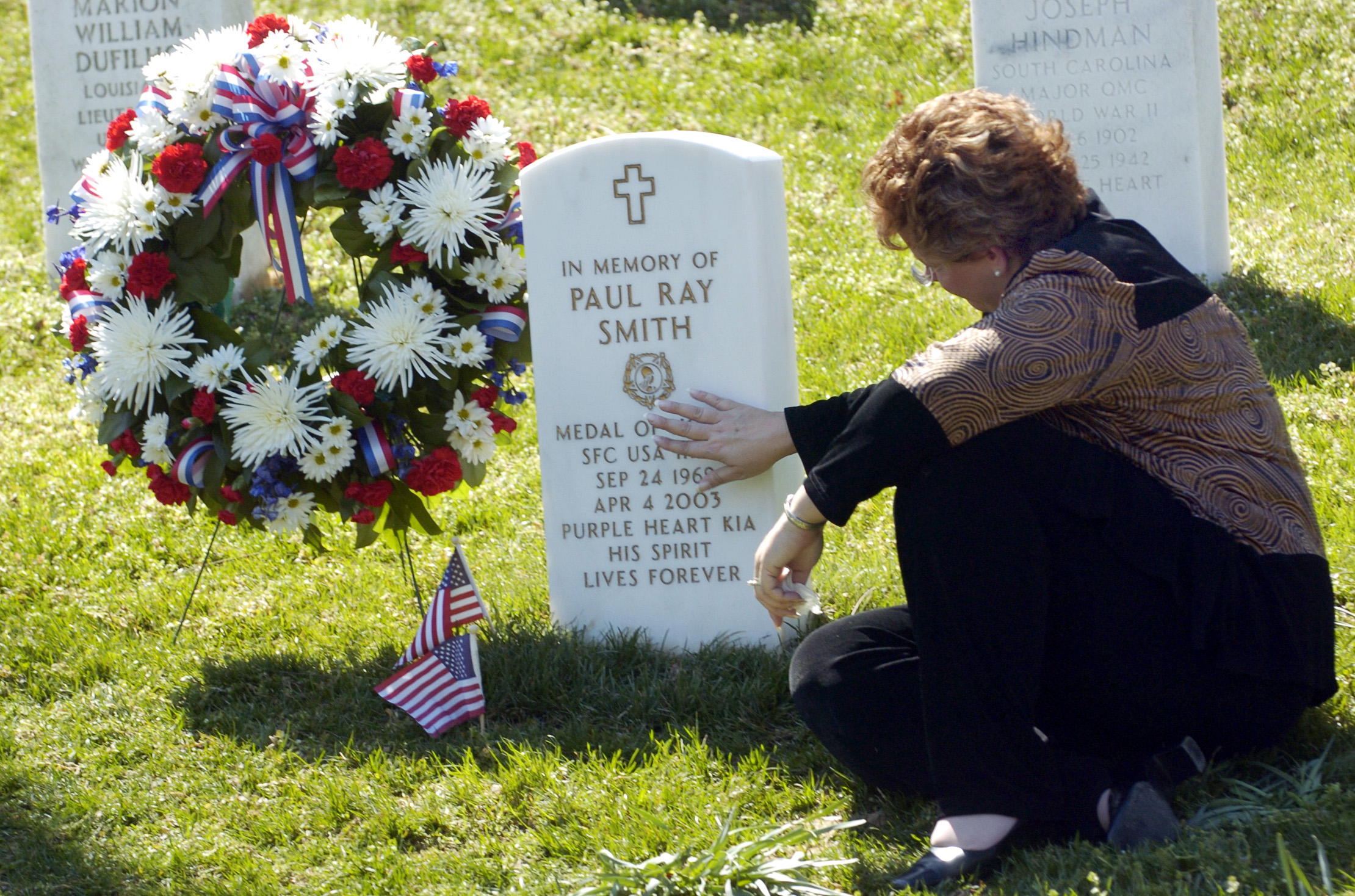
Smith's widow visiting his memorial marker in Arlington National Cemetery

=== Medal of Honor citation ===
For conspicuous gallantry and intrepidity at the risk of his life above and beyond the call of duty:

Sergeant First Class Paul R. Smith distinguished himself by acts of gallantry and intrepidity above and beyond the call of duty in action with an armed enemy near Baghdad International Airport, Baghdad, Iraq on April 4, 2003. On that day, Sergeant First Class Smith was engaged in the construction of a prisoner of war holding area when his Task Force was violently attacked by a company-sized enemy force. Realizing the vulnerability of over 100 soldiers, Sergeant First Class Smith quickly organized a hasty defense consisting of two platoons of soldiers, one Bradley Fighting Vehicle and three armored personnel carriers. As the fight developed, Sergeant First Class Smith braved hostile enemy fire to personally engage the enemy with hand grenades and anti-tank weapons, and organized the evacuation of three wounded soldiers from an armored personnel carrier struck by a rocket propelled grenade and a 60 mm mortar round. Fearing the enemy would overrun their defenses, Sergeant First Class Smith moved under withering enemy fire to man a .50 caliber machine gun mounted on a damaged armored personnel carrier. In total disregard for his own life, he maintained his exposed position in order to engage the attacking enemy force. During this action, he was mortally wounded. His courageous actions helped defeat the enemy attack, and resulted in as many as 50 enemy soldiers killed, while allowing the safe withdrawal of numerous wounded soldiers. Sergeant First Class Smith's extraordinary heroism and uncommon valor are in keeping with the highest traditions of the military service and reflect great credit upon himself, the Third Infantry Division 'Rock of the Marne,' and the United States Army.

=== Other honors ===
- In 2006, he was posthumously awarded the De Fleury Medal (Gold Medal) from the United States Army Corps of Engineers presented by Lieutenant General Carl A. Strock who was, at the time, the Chief of Engineers.
- The Counter Explosive Hazards Center school house in Fort Leonard Wood, MO is named in Smith's honor.
- The U.S. Post Office in Holiday, Florida, and the United States Army Simulation and Training Technology Center in Orlando, Florida, have been named in his honor.
- New middle schools were named in honor in Holiday, Florida, on August 25, 2006, as well as one in Tampa, Florida Sgt. Paul R. Smith Middle School on August 18, 2008, and in his hometown of Tampa, Florida, on April 27, 2009.
- Smith is also honored in the America's Army Game with information about him and a simulation of his battle.
- Birgit Smith, Smith's widow, sponsored the USS Freedom, the first Freedom class littoral combat ship, and her initials are welded on the ship's keel. The couple's Saint Christopher medal and wedding bands are also embedded in the ship's mast.
- New fitness centers at Fort Benning and Fort Stewart, Georgia, as well as one in Camp Victory, Baghdad, Iraq are named in his honor.
- The education center at Fort Stewart is named in his honor.
- Smith's last battle is mentioned in the non-fiction book Weapons. Key Weapons & Weapon Systems from 1860 to the Present.

== See also ==
- List of Medal of Honor recipients
