= Business process =

Systematic collection of tasks within a business

A business process, business method, or business function is a collection of related, structured activities or tasks performed by people or equipment in which a specific sequence produces a service or product (that serves a particular business goal) for a particular customer or customers. Business processes occur at all organizational levels and may or may not be visible to the customers. A business process may often be visualized (modeled) as a flowchart of a sequence of activities with interleaving decision points or as a process matrix of a sequence of activities with relevance rules based on data in the process. The benefits of using business processes include improved customer satisfaction and improved agility for reacting to rapid market change. Process-oriented organizations break down the barriers of structural departments and try to avoid functional silos.

== Overview ==
A business process begins with a mission objective (an external event) and ends with the achievement of the business objective of providing a result that provides customer value. Additionally, a process may be divided into subprocesses (process decomposition), the particular inner functions of the process. Business processes may also have a process owner, a responsible party for ensuring the process runs smoothly from start to finish.

Broadly speaking, business processes can be organized into three types, according to von Rosing et al.:

1. Operational processes, which constitute the core business and create the primary value stream, e.g., taking orders from customers, opening an account, and manufacturing a component
2. Management processes, the processes that oversee operational processes, including corporate governance, budgetary oversight, and employee oversight
3. Supporting processes, which support the core operational processes, e.g., accounting, recruitment, call center, technical support, and safety training

There are other definitions of the classification of processes proposed by

1. Strategic processes, which are managerial, directive, or steering processes. Management has an important role in each of these. This type of process is related to strategic planning, partnerships, etc.
2. Operational processes, also known as business processes, are of a productive or "missional" nature. These processes generate a product or service to be delivered to consumers specific to each organization.
3. Support processes, which are auxiliary in nature, support operational and strategic processes. These are responsible for providing resources and are present in most organizations.

A business made up of many processes may be decomposed into various subprocesses, each of which have their own peculiar aspects but also contribute to achieving the objectives of the business. The business review analyzes processes that usually include the mapping or modeling of processes and subprocesses down to a group of activities at different levels. Processes can be modeled using a large number of methods and techniques. For instance, the Business Process Modeling Notation is a business process modeling technique that can be used for drawing business processes in a visualized workflow. While decomposing processes into process classifications can be helpful, care must be taken as there may be crossover. At last, all processes are part of a largely unified customer-focused result, one of "customer value creation." This goal is expedited with business process management, which aims to analyze, improve, and enact business processes.

== History ==
=== Adam Smith ===
An important early (1776) description of processes was that of economist Adam Smith in his famous example of a pin factory. Inspired by an article in Diderot's Encyclopédie, Smith described the production of a pin in the following way:

One man draws out the wire; another straights it; a third cuts it; a fourth points it; a fifth grinds it at the top for receiving the head; to make the head requires two or three distinct operations; to put it on is a peculiar business; to whiten the pins is another ... and the important business of making a pin is, in this manner, divided into about eighteen distinct operations, which, in some manufactories, are all performed by distinct hands, though in others the same man will sometimes perform two or three of them.

Smith also first recognized how output could be increased through the use of labor division. Previously, in a society where production was dominated by handcrafted goods, one man would perform all the activities required during the production process, while Smith described how the work was divided into a set of simple tasks which would be performed by specialized workers. The result of labor division in Smith's example resulted in productivity increasing by 24,000 percent (sic), i.e., that the same number of workers made 240 times as many pins as they had been producing before the introduction of labor division.

Smith did not advocate labor division at any price or per se. The appropriate level of task division was defined through experimental design of the production process. In contrast to Smith's vie,w which was limited to the same functional domain and comprised activities that are in direct sequence in the manufacturing process, today's process concept includes cross-functionality as an important characteristic. Following his ideas, the division of labor was adopted widely, while the integration of tasks into a functional, or cross-functional, process was not considered as an alternative option until much later.

=== Frederick Winslow Taylor ===
American engineer Frederick Winslow Taylor greatly influenced and improved the quality of industrial processes in the early twentieth century. His Principles of Scientific Management focused on standardization of processes, systematic training, and clearly defining the roles of management and employees. His methods were widely adopted in the United States, Russia, and parts of Europe and led to further developments such as "time and motion study" and visual task optimization techniques, such as Gantt charts.

=== Peter Drucker ===
In the latter part of the twentieth century, management guru Peter Drucker focused much of his work on the simplification and decentralization of processes, which led to the concept of outsourcing. He also coined the concept of the "knowledge worker," as differentiated from manual workers – and how knowledge management would become part of an entity's processes.

=== Other definitions ===
Davenport (1993) defines a (business) process as:

a structured, measured set of activities designed to produce a specific output for a particular customer or market. It implies a strong emphasis on how work is done within an organization, in contrast to a product focus's emphasis on what. A process is thus a specific ordering of work activities across time and space, with a beginning and an end, and clearly defined inputs and outputs: a structure for action. ... Taking a process approach implies adopting the customer's point of view. Processes are the structure by which an organization does what is necessary to produce value for its customers.

This definition contains certain characteristics that a process must possess. These characteristics are achieved by focusing on the business logic of the process (how work is done) instead of taking a product perspective (what is done). Following Davenport's definition of a process, we can conclude that a process must have clearly defined boundaries, input and output, consist of smaller parts and activities which are ordered in time and space, that there must be a receiver of the process outcome—a customer – and that the transformation taking place within the process must add customer value.

Hammer & Champy's (1993) definition can be considered a subset of Davenport's. They define a process as:

a collection of activities that takes one or more kinds of input and creates an output that is of value to the customer.

As we can note, Hammer & Champy have a more transformation-oriented perception and put less emphasis on the structural component – process boundaries and the order of activities in time and space.

Rummler & Brache (1995) use a definition that clearly encompasses a focus on the organization's external customers, when stating that

a business process is a series of steps designed to produce a product or service. Most processes (...) are cross-functional, spanning the 'white space' between the boxes on the organization chart. Some processes result in a product or service that is received by an organization's external customer. We call these primary processes. Other processes produce products that are invisible to the external customer but essential to the effective management of the business. We call these support processes.

The above definition distinguishes two types of processes, primary and support processes, depending on whether a process is directly involved in the creation of customer value or concerned with the organization's internal activities. In this sense, Rummler and Brache's definition follows Porter's value chain model, which also builds on a division of primary and secondary activities. According to Rummler and Brache, a typical characteristic of a successful process-based organization is the absence of secondary activities in the primary value flow that is created in the customer-oriented primary processes. The characteristic of processes spanning the white space on the organization chart indicates that processes are embedded in some form of organizational structure. Also, a process can be cross-functional, i.e., it ranges over several business functions.

Johansson et al. (1993). define a process as:

a set of linked activities that take an input and transform it to create an output. A transformation results from the process adding value to the input and creating an output that is more useful and effective to the recipient either upstream or downstream.

This definition also emphasizes the links between activities and the transformation that takes place within the process. Johansson et al. also include the upstream part of the value chain as a possible recipient of the process output. Summarizing the four definitions above, the following list of characteristics for a business process can be compiled:

1. Definability: It must have clearly defined boundaries, inputs, and output.
2. Order: It must consist of activities that are ordered according to their position in time and space (a sequence).
3. Customer: There must be a recipient of the process' outcome, a customer.
4. Value-adding: The transformation taking place within the process must add value to the recipient, either upstream or downstream.
5. Embeddedness: A process cannot exist in itself, it must be embedded in an organizational structure.
6. Cross-functionality: A process regularly can, but not necessarily must, span several functions.

Frequently, identifying a process owner (i.e., the person responsible for the continuous improvement of the process) is considered as a prerequisite. Sometimes the process owner is the same person who is performing the process.

== Related concepts ==
=== Workflow ===
Workflow is the procedural movement of information, material, and tasks from one participant to another. Workflow includes the procedures, people and tools involved in each step of a business process. A single workflow may either be sequential, with each step contingent upon completion of the previous one, or parallel, with multiple steps occurring simultaneously. Multiple combinations of single workflows may be connected to achieve a resulting overall process.

=== Business process re-engineering ===
Business process re-engineering (BPR) was originally conceptualized by Hammer and Davenport as a means to improve organizational effectiveness and productivity. It can involve starting from a "blank slate" and completely recreating major business processes, or it can involve comparing the "as-is" process and the "to-be" process and mapping the path for change from one to the other. Often BPR will involve the use of information technology to secure significant performance improvement. The term unfortunately became associated with corporate "downsizing" in the mid-1990s.

=== Business process management (BPM) ===
Though the term has been used contextually to mixed effect, "business process management" (BPM) can generally be defined as a discipline involving a combination of a wide variety of business activity flows (e.g., business process automation, modeling, and optimization) that strives to support the goals of an enterprise within and beyond multiple boundaries, involving many people, from employees to customers and external partners. A major part of BPM's enterprise support involves the continuous evaluation of existing processes and the identification of ways to improve upon it, resulting in a cycle of overall organizational improvement.

=== Knowledge management ===
Knowledge management is the definition of the knowledge that employees and systems use to perform their functions and maintaining it in a format that can be accessed by others. Duhon and the Gartner Group have defined it as "a discipline that promotes an integrated approach to identifying, capturing, evaluating, retrieving, and sharing all of an enterprise's information assets. These assets may include databases, documents, policies, procedures, and previously un-captured expertise and experience in individual workers."

Customer Service
Customer Service is a key component to an effective business plan. Customer service in the 21st century is always evolving, and it is important to grow with your customer base. Not only does a social media presence matter, but also clear communication, clear expectation setting, speed, and accuracy. If the customer service provided by a business is not effective, it can be detrimental to the business success.

=== Total quality management ===
Total quality management (TQM) emerged in the early 1980s as organizations sought to improve the quality of their products and services. It was followed by the Six Sigma methodology in the mid-1980s, first introduced by Motorola. Six Sigma consists of statistical methods to improve business processes and thus reduce defects in outputs. The "lean approach" to quality management was introduced by the Toyota Motor Company in the 1990s and focused on customer needs and reducing of wastage.

=== Information technology as an enabler for business process management ===
Advances in information technology over the years have changed business processes within and between business enterprises. In the 1960s, operating systems had limited functionality, and any workflow management systems that were in use were tailor-made for the specific organization. The 1970s and 1980s saw the development of data-driven approaches as data storage and retrieval technologies improved. Data modeling, rather than process modeling was the starting point for building an information system. Business processes had to adapt to information technology because process modeling was neglected. The shift towards process-oriented management occurred in the 1990s. Enterprise resource planning software with workflow management components such as SAP, Baan, PeopleSoft, Oracle and JD Edwards emerged, as did business process management systems (BPMS) later.

The world of e-business created a need to automate business processes across organizations, which in turn raised the need for standardized protocols and web services composition languages that can be understood across the industry. The Business Process Modeling Notation (BPMN) and Business Motivation Model (BMM) are widely used standards for business modeling. The Business Modeling and Integration Domain Task Force (BMI DTF) is a consortium of vendors and user companies that continues to work together to develop standards and specifications to promote collaboration and integration of people, systems, processes and information within and across enterprises.

The most recent trends in BPM are influenced by the emergence of cloud technology, the prevalence of social media and mobile technology, and the development of analytical techniques. Cloud-based technologies allow companies to purchase resources quickly and as required, independent of their location. Social media, websites and smart phones are the newest channels through which organizations reach and support their customers. The abundance of customer data collected through these channels as well as through call center interactions, emails, voice calls, and customer surveys has led to a huge growth in data analytics which in turn is utilized for performance management and improving the ways in which the company services its customers.

== Importance of the process chain ==
Business processes comprise a set of sequential sub-processes or tasks with alternative paths, depending on certain conditions as applicable, performed to achieve a given objective or produce given outputs. Each process has one or more needed inputs. The inputs and outputs may be received from, or sent to other business processes, other organizational units, or internal or external stakeholders.

Business processes are designed to be operated by one or more business functional units, and emphasize the importance of the "process chain" rather than the individual units.

In general, the various tasks of a business process can be performed in one of two ways:

1. manually
2. by means of business data processing systems such as ERP systems

Some process tasks are performed manually, while others are computer-based. These tasks can be arranged in different sequences, meaning that the data and information handled during a process may pass through manual and computer-based tasks in varying orders.

== Policies, processes and procedures ==
The above improvement areas are equally applicable to policies, processes, detailed procedures (sub-processes/tasks) and work instructions. There is a cascading effect of improvements made at a higher level on those made at a lower level.

For example, if a recommendation to replace a given policy is made with proper justification and accepted in principle by business process owners, then changes in the resulting processes and procedures may follow implementation.

== Reporting as an essential base for execution ==
Business processes must include up-to-date and accurate reports to ensure effective action. An example of this is the availability of purchase order status reports for supplier delivery follow-up as described in the section on effectiveness above.

Another example from production is the process of analyzing line rejections occurring on the shop floor. This process should include systematic periodical analysis of rejections by reason and present the results in a suitable information report that pinpoints the major reasons and trends in these reasons for management to take corrective actions to control rejections and keep them within acceptable limits. Such a process of analysis and summarisation of line rejection events is clearly superior to a process which merely inquires into each individual rejection as it occurs.

Business process owners and operatives should realise that process improvement often occurs with introduction of appropriate transaction, operational, highlight, exception or M.I.S. reports, provided these are consciously used for day-to-day or periodical decision-making. With this understanding would hopefully come the willingness to invest time and other resources in business process improvement by introduction of useful and relevant reporting systems.

== Supporting theories and concepts ==
=== Span of control ===
The span of control is the number of subordinates a supervisor manages within a structural organization. Introducing a business process concept has a considerable impact on the structural elements of the organization and, thus also on the span of control.

Large organizations that are not organized as markets need to be organized in smaller units, or departments – which can be defined according to different principles.

=== Information management concepts ===
Information management and the organization's infrastructure strategies related to it, are a theoretical cornerstone of the business process concept, requiring "a framework for measuring the level of IT support for business processes."

== See also ==
- Business functions
- Business method patent
- Business process automation
- Business Process Definition Metamodel
- Business process mapping
- Business process outsourcing
