= Center for Army Analysis =

Army installations

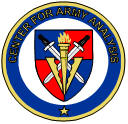
- CAA Logo
- Country: United States
- Branch: Army
- Type: Research and development
- Garrison/HQ: Fort Belvoir, Virginia

Commanders
- Director: Steven A. Stoddard
- Director Emeritus: E.B. Vandiver III

Center for Army Analysis
- Part of United States Army

Location
- Coordinates: 38°42′52.9776″N 77°08′36.8628″W

The Center for Army Analysis (CAA), formerly US Army's Center for Strategy and Force Evaluation, is a US Army organization under the Deputy Chief of Staff G-8 (Note: See the Wikipedia article Continental Staff System for an explanation of "letter-number" designations (e.g. G-8)) (DCS G-8) which is responsible for analyses that impact the Army at the strategic or institutional level.

== Mission ==
CAA conducts analyses across the spectrum of conflict in a Joint, Interagency, Intergovernmental, and Multinational (JIIM) context to inform critical senior level decisions for current and future national security issues. Mission of CAA is to conduct analysis of Army forces and systems in the context of joint and combined warfighting. The CAA provides analytical studies focusing on theater-level, Joint and combined operations, and Army-wide processes providing required Army forces and systems. These studies help senior Army leadership, the Army Staff, and operational commanders address transformation, programming and budgeting, and operational issues. Full-time analysts are deployed in Afghanistan, Africa, and the Pacific, providing operations research and analysis support to senior commanders. CAA further supports deployed forces with more sophisticated operations research and analytical capabilities through its real-time reach back operations at Fort Belvoir, Virginia.

== History ==
The Center for Army Analysis (CAA), originally labeled the Concept Analysis Agency, was formed as a result of the 1973 STEADFAST Army reorganization which combined missions, functions and elements of the Combat Developments Command (CDC) and the Strategy and Tactics Analysis Group (STAG), organizations that had their origin in the early 1960s, into one analytical organization. CAA was created to function as the central force analysis activity for the Department of the Army and its leadership and was initially under the jurisdiction of the Assistant Chief of Staff of the Army.

In 1974, the Army Staff was reorganized and CAA was placed under the jurisdiction of the Deputy Chief of Staff for Operations and Plans, Headquarters, Department of the Army (HQDA). As the scope of its analytical mission grew, CAA, located in Bethesda, MD, was designated as a Field Operating Agency in 1977, and was reassigned to the Army Chief of Staff's Organization in 1979.

In 1991 the Vice Chief of Staff for the Army designated CAA as the Army's Center for Strategy and Force Evaluation. In 1998 the Secretary of the Army directed the United States Army Concepts Analysis Agency be renamed the Center for Army Analysis with the primary mission of helping the Chief of Staff of the Army (CSA) determine requirements and establish objectives for theater-level joint/combined forces. CAA force analyses focus on integrating scenarios, operating concepts and objectives, unit and material performance characteristics and operating parameters of the regions for which the forces are constituted. These analyses form the baseline for analyses of lower-level forces and systems.

In March 1999 CAA relocated to its present location, the Dr. Wilbur B. Payne Memorial Hall at Fort Belvoir, VA.

As part of the HQDA 2002 realignment, CAA was aligned under the Deputy Chief of Staff G-8. The G-8 has responsibility for the future Army through programming, material integration, program analysis and evaluation and centralized management of HQDA studies and analysis programs including the Army Study Program. With this realignment CAA's role as the major source for HQDA analysis support was strengthened.

When the office of the Deputy Under Secretary of the Army (Operations Research) closed in 2006, the Director of CAA was designated Senior Analyst of the Army with responsibility for periodic Army Senior Analyst Reviews, sponsorship of the Army Operations Research Symposium and of the Military Operations Research Society and oversight of international operations research partnership activities.

Effective 12 April 2009, the Army Modeling and Simulation Office (AMSO) was transferred from the Deputy Chief of Staff G-3/5/7 to the Deputy Chief of Staff G-8. The transfer included the current AMSO missions of acting as the proponency for the Military Functional Area (FA) 57, Simulation Operations and the civilian Career Program (CP) 36, Modeling and Simulation and the simulation and modeling school.

The Center for Army Analysis has twice been awarded the Army Superior Unit Award, for the periods 1999–2000 and 2010–2012.

CAA and its predecessor organizations have provided continuous analytical support to HQDA since 1960. Much has changed at CAA over the years. CAA once did lengthy studies of 9 months to 1½ years; now it performs quick-reaction analyses that take days, weeks, or a few months. CAA once focused almost exclusively on analysis of the Central Front in Germany; now it conducts analyses ranging over all areas of the globe. CAA once almost exclusively supported the Office of the Deputy Chief of Staff for Operations and Plans. While the primary role of CAA remains to support HQDA and Army leadership, its analytical activities have expanded to encompass a wide range of analytical services performed in support of many Army elements and, occasionally, other Department of Defense and US government organizations.

Current Director: Dr. Steven Alexander Stoddard

Past Directors:

- MG Hal Hallgren January 1973 – February 1976
- MG Ennis C. Whitehead Jr. April 1976 – May 1980
- MG Edward B. Atkenson July 1980 – February 1982
- Mr. David C. Hardison February 1982 – September 1984
- Mr. E. B. Vandiver III September 1984 – November 2012
- Dr. William Forrest Crain November 2012 - May 2020

== See also ==
- Army Model and Simulation Executive Council
