= EuroSim =

Annual international intercollegiate simulation of the European Union

EuroSim Logo

EuroSim is an annual international intercollegiate simulation of the European Union. The purpose of EuroSim is to provide a framework for a partial simulation of a major EU issue.

More than two hundred students, drawn from universities in North America and Europe, participate in the simulation. All students are assigned roles, including Members of the European Parliament, members of the European Commission, heads of government, and national ministers. Students prepare for the simulation at their own universities with the help of faculty advisers and guidance provided through a course management website. Researching the simulation topic and the assigned roles constitute an important part of all students' preparatory work. The simulations are held over four days, with the venue alternating between the U.S. and Europe annually.

Recent issues simulated include energy policy, asylum policy, food safety, enlargement, the Constitutional Convention, the Intergovernmental Conference, EU neighborhood policy, Kosovo, EU-Russia relations, EU Budget, migration policy, and data retention.

== History ==
The idea for a model European Union came in the fall of 1987 when students at State University of New York (SUNY) College at Brockport asked the political science department to sponsor a model United Nations. After thorough consideration by faculty, students at SUNY Brockport agreed to be involved in a project regarding what was formerly called the European Community.

The first simulation was held on the Brockport campus, April 8–10, 1988. Involving SUNY and private New York schools, the simulation held the title SUNYMEC (State University of New York Model European Community). It wasn't until 1992 the simulation established the label EuroSim and became a trans-Atlantic exchange with its first overseas meeting in Luxemburg. The 2003 simulation event was the first time EuroSim was a trans-Atlantic endeavor - a sure sign of the simulation's maturity. The term “trans-Atlantic” indicates the simulation is organized and planned by faculty and students from both Europe and the United States. EuroSim 2003 was the first time the simulation was planned by U.S. and European student directors equally.

A simulation was held at the Europaisch Akademie in Otzenhausen, Germany, in 2008. The 2009 EuroSim was hosted by Canisius College in Buffalo, New York, followed by a simulation at the University of Antwerp in 2010. In 2011, EuroSim moved out of New York state for the first time, with Widener University in Chester, Pennsylvania. In 2012, The University of Lower Silesia in Wroclaw, Poland, held the simulation. The most recent simulation was held at East Stroudsburg University, Pennsylvania, April 4-7, 2013. The next edition will be hosted by the University of Twente, the Netherlands, January 4-7, 2014, on the theme of "Economic and Social Policy: Minimum Income Directive".

== Sponsorship ==
A university organizes and hosts EuroSim each year.

== External links and resources ==
- University of Twente Homepage
