= Stability and support operations =

Stability and support operations is a historical US military term for operations involve military forces providing safety and support to friendly noncombatants while suppressing threatening forces.

SASO operations can occur in everything from natural disaster areas (earthquakes, storms and flooding) to insurgencies (revolts, social upheavals). The extent of SASO operations can range from interacting with the local population to military operations with specific rules of engagement.

The underlying dynamics of SASO and related "stabilization" activities have proven controversial and are the subject of increasing academic and policy-level debate.
