= Synthetic psychological environment =

In a synthetic environment, synthetic psychological environment (SPE) (or rules of behavior) refers to the representation (i.e. modeling) of influences to individuals and groups as a result of culture (e.g. demography, law, religion)).

== Synonyms ==
SPE is known by many names including:

- Cultural factors
- Cultural modeling
- Human terrain
- Non-kinetic effects
- Political, military, economic, social, information, and infrastructure (PMESII)

== Models ==
A few models that represent aspects of SPE are:

- Joint non-kinetic effects model (JNEM)
- Simulation of cultural identities for prediction of reactions (SCIPR)
- Minerva model (i.e. from Minerva Project)
- Integrated gaming system (IGS)
- Synthetic environment for analysis and simulations (SEAS)

== See also ==
- Glossary of military modeling and simulation
- Human Terrain Team
- Modeling and simulation
