= Army Model and Simulation Executive Council =

The Army Model and Simulation Executive Council (AMSEC) last convened in 2005; soon after it was discontinued by the Army M&S Office (AMSO).

All public access to any AMSEC-related documents were removed at that time. Any documents provided by non-AMSO personnel should not be considered current.

AR 5–11, which formerly references the AMSEC, has been rewritten.
