= Army Modeling & Simulation Office =

Army Modeling & Simulation Office (AMSO) is a US Army organization within the Office of the Deputy Chief of Staff G-8 of the United States Army, Center for Army Analysis (CAA). Previously, the AMSO transitioned from the Office of the Deputy Chief of Staff G-3/5/7.

== Mission ==
The mission of AMSO is to guide, coordinate, integrate, and synchronize strategic M&S efforts across the Army in order to create unity of effort and purpose. AMSO also develops and implements a coherent and unified Army M&S strategy to organize and equip the Army with M&S capabilities in support of Operating and Generating Force functions and institutional processes. As Proponent for Functional Area 57 Simulation Operations & Battle Command Officers, and Career Program 36 M&S Civilians, AMSO recruits, trains, supplies, and maintains a professional M&S workforce.

== Vision ==
By 2030, leaders at all levels, from the Generating and Operating Forces down to platoon level will routinely employ models and simulations that support decision-making, course of action development, mission planning, rehearsal, and operations.

== Strategic Objectives ==
The Army Modeling & Simulation Strategy signed by the Vice Chief of Staff of the United States Army in 2008 identified five strategic objectives <see AMSO website> vital to the Modeling and Simulation enterprise to achieve the Army intent.

The technical and cultural boundaries between modeling, simulation, and games are increasingly blurring, providing broader access to capabilities in modeling and simulation and further credibility to game-based applications. The National Research Council's Committee on Modeling, Simulation, and Games, conducted a study whose purpose was to provide a technical assessment of Modeling, Simulation, and Games (MS&G) research and development worldwide and to identify future applications of this technology and its potential impacts on government and society. This study, entitled, "The Rise of Games and High Performance Computing for Modeling and Simulation", identifies feasible applications of gaming and simulation for military systems; associated vulnerabilities of, risks to, and impacts on critical defense capabilities; and other significant indicators and warnings that can help prevent or mitigate surprises related to technology applications by those with hostile intent. The report recommends priorities for future action by appropriate departments of the intelligence community (IC),1 the Department of Defense (DoD) research community, and other government entities.

== Responsibilities ==
• Organize and equip Army M&S • Train & supply qualified M&S professionals to the Army
