= Army Knowledge Online =

Army Knowledge Online logo

Army Knowledge Online (AKO) was a web application that provided enterprise information services to the United States Army, joint, and Department of Defense customers.

AKO was sunset in 2021. The remaining following information is historical in nature.

Enterprise services were provided to those customers on both classified and unclassified networks, and included portal, e-mail, directory, discovery, and single sign-on functionality. All members of the Active Duty, National Guard, Reserves, Army civilian, and select contractor workforce had an account which granted access to Army web assets, tools and services worldwide. All users could build pages, create file storage areas, and create and participate in discussion on the portal. AKO provided the Army with a single entry point for access to the Internet and the sharing of knowledge and information, making AKO the Army's only enterprise collaboration tool operating throughout the Department of the Army (DA) worldwide. AKO was deemed "the world's largest intranet in the early 2000's." One of every two deployed soldiers accessed the portal daily for mission and personal purposes, and in 2008 AKO recorded its one-billionth login. AKO had been expanded to the broader DoD community through Defense Knowledge Online, essentially just a rebranding.

AKO was an integrated suite of a number of commercial-off-the-shelf products, including the Appian Business Process Management (BPM) Suite technology. Appian provides the foundation for all information dissemination, knowledge sharing, process management and collaboration across AKO. Users can build custom access control lists for each piece of content they own to determine the audience allowed to see or use their content. AKO had approximately 2.3 million registered users, supporting over 350K users logging in up to a million times a day as well as receiving and delivering on average 12 million emails daily.

== History and development ==
AKO was established in the late 1990s as an experimental outgrowth of a project of the General Office Management Office. This early project led to A2OL (America's Army Online), but legal concerns over this name and the parallelism to other commercial vendors caused the Army Project team to seek a new name. Early Project Officers for AKO were charged to develop, research and expand the portal to benefit Army Users Worldwide and to grow the system from its less than auspicious roots. The project has run through various incarnations and later project leaders, but still the fundamentals of this system apply: centralized name spacing of email (with webmail access), white pages, unification of data conduits, central capability of authentication and repudiation of credentials and the ability to remotely access content.

At the time of creation, the Army did not have a centralized portal construct. Army intranet presences on networks were not highly developed, or were more limited in capability and scope. AKO attempted to become a central portal for communication among Army (military and civilian) Service members and contractors. Efforts like "email for life" piloted by AKO was an early precursor to "Soldier for Life" initiatives in the Army. Other initiatives, such as PKI, were also piloted by AKO, prior to widespread adoption by the Army. Over time, AKO incorporated many centralized functions to improve utility as an intranet portal and central services hub.

== Users ==
By 01 October 2000, under direction from General Shinseki, Chief of Staff, Army (CSA) all Active Duty, Army National Guard and Army Reserve soldiers were required to register for an account on AKO. There are two different types of accounts on Army Knowledge Online, a full account and a guest account. Authorized full accounts did not require any sponsorship to register, and included the following:

- Active Army
- Army Reserve
- Army Retired
- Contracted ROTC Cadets
- DA Civilian
- Future Soldiers
- Medical Retired
- NAF Civilian
- National Guard
- US Military Academy Cadets

Unlike a full account, guest accounts require an Army sponsor with an authorized full account. Guest accounts include the following:

- Army Volunteer
- Contractor
- Federal Civilian Agencies
- Foreign Officer (attached to U.S. Army)
- Homeland Security
- Incoming DA Civilian
- Incoming Future Soldier
- Local National Employee
- Medical Discharge
- Military Transition
- ROTC Cadets (MS I and II)
- Military Dependents

== Features and functionality ==
A primary function of Army Knowledge Online was its web-based e-mail and collaboration capabilities. The process capabilities of AKO's underlying technology had been rolled out to AKO organizations for the development and delivery of Business Process Management applications. One example of an AKO BPM application is "Wounded Warrior," a case management software for the diagnosis and rehabilitation of soldiers wounded in the field.

AKO's Training function allows soldiers and DA (Department of Army) civilians to access Army online education such as Army e-learning Program, Army Learning Management System, Army Correspondence Course Program, Army transcript, US Army Reserve Virtual University, etc. These learning programs allow soldiers and DA civilians opportunities to enrich their educations, such as business courses which are free of charge. These courses can help soldiers with promotion points, and also later be transferred into college credits.

AKO's Finance function allows soldiers to access their financial records, including Leave and Earning Statement, housing allowances, Food allowances, etc. AKO's Medical function has soldiers medical records, including DNA, past physical exam, and status of deployment readiness. There are many other functions as well, including as legal, travel, benefits, family, forms, readiness, and references.

== Access and security ==
Registering for an AKO account was mandatory upon enlistment in the Army. AKO access followed DoD security policy, and was accomplished by password or by a combination of a Common Access Card (CAC) and PIN. The requirements for an AKO password were stringent; a password must contain at least two uppercase letters, two lowercase letters, two numbers, and two special characters. Passwords expired every 150 days, and could not be replaced by any password used the previous ten times. As of 08 April 2015, AKO could no longer be accessed without the use of a military CAC card or a DoD-approved PIV.

== Criticism ==
The AKO system received some substantial criticism with regards to its speed, various areas of functionality, complex security requirements, effectiveness, and compatibility with web browsers, particularly from its daily users. Program leadership maintained that system cumbersomeness was a necessary result of securing all its information, and with increasing cyber threats. Certain required functionality, however, is available only within the AKO system. As time progressed, other capabilities, such as Cloud or SharePoint for organizations, commercial email/applications like Gmail or O365 for individuals, were used as appropriate to fill specific organizational or individual needs.
