= Business Process Definition Metamodel =

The Business Process Definition Metamodel (BPDM) is a standard definition of concepts used to express business process models (a metamodel), adopted by the OMG (Object Management Group). Metamodels define concepts, relationships, and semantics for exchange of user models between different modeling tools. The exchange format is defined by XSD (XML Schema) and XMI (XML for Metadata Interchange), a specification for transformation of OMG metamodels to XML. Pursuant to the OMG's policies, the metamodel is the result of an open process involving submissions by member organizations, following a Request for Proposal (RFP) issued in 2003. BPDM was adopted in initial form in July 2007, and finalized in July 2008.

BPDM provides abstract concepts as the basis for consistent interpretation of specialized concepts used by business process modelers. For example, the ordering of many of the graphical elements in a BPMN (Business Process Model and Notation) diagram is depicted by arrows between those elements, but the specific elements can have a variety of characteristics. For example, all BPMN events have some common characteristics, and a variety of specific events are designated by the type of circle and the icon in the circle. The abstract BPDM concepts ensure implementers of different modeling tools will associate the same characteristics and semantics with the modeling elements to ensure models are interpreted the same way when moved to a different tool. Users of the modeling tools do not need to be concerned with the abstractions—they only see the specialized elements.

BPDM extends business process modeling beyond the elements defined by BPMN and BPEL (Business Process Execution Language) to include interactions between otherwise-independent business processes executing in different business units or enterprises (choreography). A choreography can be specified independently of its participants, and used as a requirement for the specification of the orchestration implemented by a participant. BPDM provides for the binding of orchestration to choreography to ensure compatibility. Many current business process models focus on specification of executable business processes that execute within an enterprise (orchestration).

The BPDM specification addresses the objectives of the OMG RFP on which it is based:

- BPDM "will define a set of abstract business process definition elements for specification of executable business processes that execute within an enterprise, and may collaborate between otherwise-independent business processes executing in different business units or enterprises."
- Common metamodel to unify the diverse business process definition notations that exist in the industry containing semantics compatible with leading business process modeling notations.
- A metamodel that complements existing UML metamodels so that business processes specifications can be part of complete system specifications to assure consistency and completeness.
- The ability to integrate process models for workflow management processes, automated business processes, and collaborations between business units.
- Support for the specification of web services choreography, describing the collaboration between participating entities and the ability to reconcile the choreography with supporting internal business processes.
- The ability to exchange business process specifications between modeling tools, and between tools and execution environments using XMI.

The RFP seeks to "improve communication between modelers, including between business and software modelers, provide flexible selection of tools and execution environments, and promote the development of more specialised tools for the analysis and design of processes."

For exchange of business process models, BPDM is an alternative to the existing process interchange format XPDL (XML Process Definition Language) from the WfMC (Workflow Management Coalition). The two specifications are similar in that they can be used by process design tools to exchange business process definitions. They are different in that BPDM provides a specification of semantics integrated in a metamodel, and it includes additional modeling capabilities such as choreography, discussed above. In addition, XPDL has many implementations, though only some support for XPDL 2.x, needed for interchanging BPMN. BPDM implementations are in preparation, including support for BPMN, and translation to XPDL.
