= National Defense Industrial Association =

American trade association founded 1919

- Abbreviation: NDIA
- Formation: 1919
- Type: Voluntary Association
- Headquarters: Arlington, Virginia
- Location: United States
- Members: Corporate, Individual, Small Business, and Life
- President and CEO: David Norquist
- Affiliations: Association For Enterprise Integration (AFEI); National Training and Simulation Association (NTSA); Precision Strike Association (PSA); Women in Defense (WID)
- Staff: 75
- Website: NDIA.org

The National Defense Industrial Association (NDIA) is a trade association for the United States government and defense industrial base. It is an 501(c)(3) educational organization. Its headquarters are in Arlington, Virginia. NDIA was established in 1919 as a result of the inability of the defense industry to scale up the war effort during World War I.

== Founding ==
In 1917, Brigadier General Benedict Crowell was called to active duty and served on the General Munitions Board. As a board member, he established a relationship with the steel industry and was almost immediately appointed Assistant Secretary of War and Director of Munitions. As Director of Munitions, Crowell was a significant catalyst in improving the country's capability to produce arms and ammunition. However, he recognized the nation's need for an association that fostered cooperation between civilian industry and government in support of industrial preparedness. He founded the Army Ordnance Association (AOA) in 1919 and served as president for its first 25 years. Over the ensuing decades, AOA became the American Defense Preparedness Association (ADPA), which then merged with the 1944 National Security Industrial Association (NSIA) in 1997, creating NDIA.

== Advocacy ==
=== Opposition to military right-to-repair legislation ===
In July 2024, NDIA signed a letter to members of both the House Committee on Armed Services and the Senate Committee on Armed Services opposing Section 828 of S. 4628, the National Defense Authorization Act for Fiscal Year 2025, entitled "Requirement for Contractors to Provide Reasonable Access to Repair Materials". The proposed Section 828 raised concerns for NDIA that include "no carve-outs or limitations to protect sensitive trade secret information" and impacts on "the economics of a dealer distribution model by effectively eliminating dealer margins ... [impacting] ... small and medium-sized businesses", amongst other issues.

== Publications ==
NDIA currently publishes National Defense, Weekly Policy Digest, Weekly Defense Insider, and Monthly Defense Watch.

=== National Defense magazine ===
National Defense has been published under a series of different titles since 1940:

- 2005–Present - National Defense
- 1947–1954 - The Common Defense
- 1947–1970 - Ordnance
- 1945–1947 - Logistics
- 1920–1945 - Army Ordnance

Additional variations during the above periods:

- 1946 - Industrial Preparedness Bulletin
- 1943–1945 - Army Ordnance Report
- 1940–1946 - Army Ordnance Bulletin

== Chapters ==
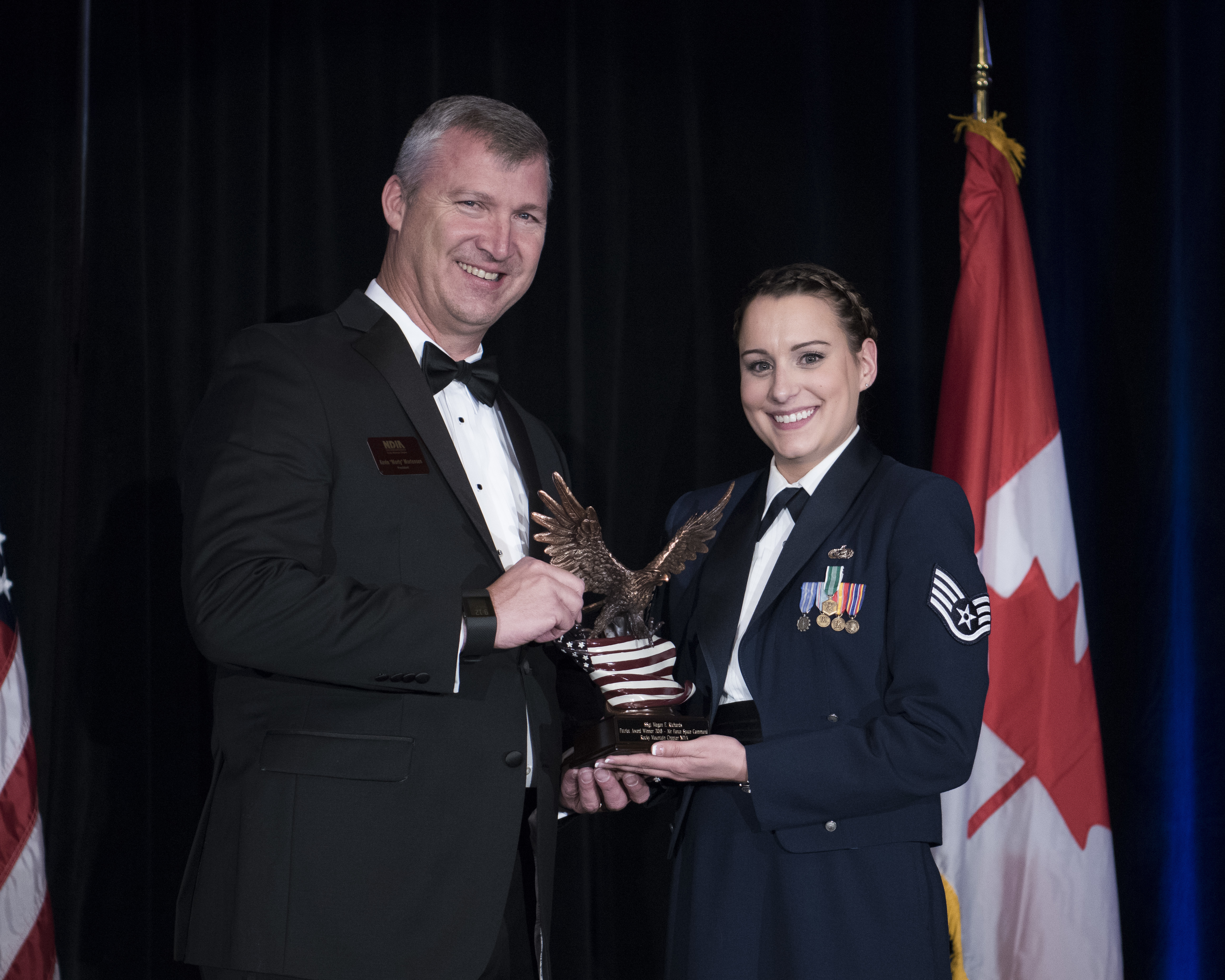
President of the Rocky Mountain Chapter presents the Patriot Award (2018)

NDIA has 29 chapters located throughout the United States.

NDIA Chapters
Aberdeen Proving Ground	Central Florida	Central New Jersey	Delaware Valley
First Coast	Georgia	Great Lakes	Great Rivers
Greater Hampton Roads	Greater Indiana	Greater Los Angeles	Greater New York-Connecticut
Greater Tampa Bay	Gulf Coast	Iowa-Illinois	Lone Star
Michigan	New England	North Carolina	Pacific Northwest
Picatinny	Red River Regional	Rocky Mountain	San Diego
Southern Nevada	Southwest	Tennessee Valley	Washington, DC
Wright Brothers Regional

== Divisions ==
NDIA consists of subject-specific divisions that aim to promote defense and national security through access, influence, and education.

NDIA Divisions
Agile Delivery for Agencies, Programs, and Teams (ADAPT)	Armaments	Bomb & Warhead
Chemical, Biological, Radiological, and Nuclear (CBRN) Defense	Combat Survivability	Cyber-Augmented Operations (CAO)
Cybersecurity	Electronics	Expeditionary Warfare
Health Affairs	Human Systems	Integrated Program Management
International	Logistics Management	Manufacturing
Missile Defense	Munitions Technology	Procurement
Robotics	Science and Engineering Today	Security and Counterintelligence
Small Business	Space	Special Operations/Low-Intensity Conflict
Strike, Land Attack, and Air Defense (SLAAD)	Systems Engineering	Tactical Wheeled Vehicles
Technical Information	Test & Evaluation	Undersea Warfare

== Committees and working groups ==
NDIA has 5 industrial committees and working groups that bring government and industry personnel together on important topics.

NDIA Industrial Committees and Working Groups
Chemical Biological Defense Acquisition Initiatives Forum	Industrial Committee of Ammunition Producers	Industrial Committee on Operational Test and Evaluation
Cybersecurity for Advanced Manufacturing Working Group	Trusted Microelectrics Joint Working Group	

== Affiliate associations ==
NDIA affiliates include the Association for Enterprise Information (AFEI), the Emerging Technologies Institute (ETI), the National Training & Simulation Association (NTSA), the Precision Strike Association (PSA), and Women in Defense (WID).

== See also ==
- Military–industrial complex
- National defense
- Warfighter
