= United States Army Simulation and Training Technology Center =

Research center of the United States Army

Coordinates: 28.5883°N 81.1969°W

Sergeant First Class Paul Ray Smith Simulation and Training Technology Center
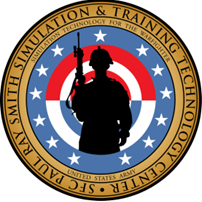
- STTC emblem
- Active: 1 October 2002 – present
- Country: United States
- Branch: Army
- Type: Research and development
- Garrison/HQ: Orlando, Florida

Commanders
- STTC Director: Mr. Ivan Martinez

The United States Army Simulation and Training Technology Center (STTC) provides the United States Department of Defense and United States Department of Homeland Security with applied research, helping to develop simulation technologies, build on current simulation knowledge, and understand system of systems environments where human, agent, and teams are involved. The STTC is located in Orlando, Florida.

== History ==
The STTC traces its lineage to 1983, when the Defense Advanced Projects Research Agency (DARPA) started work on a technology to network a large number of manned simulators, emulators, and semi-automated force simulations to form a Distributed Interactive Simulation (DIS) of a battlefield. DARPA ran the project from 1983 to 1989, and convinced the Army to use DIS technology.

The Army Science Board studied the technology in 1991, and found a central management structure was necessary to ensure an integrated system. The board's recommendation resulted in the U.S. Army Training and Doctrine Command (TRADOC) and U.S. Army Materiel Command (AMC) sharing management responsibility for the new system. TRADOC designated its National Simulation Center (NSC) as its functional manager for controlling the requirements process. AMC created a new major subordinate command in 1992—the U.S. Army Simulation, Training and Instrumentation Command (STRICOM) (its current name being PEO STRI), headquartered in Orlando, Florida—to serve as the technical manager for system execution. STRICOM consisted of two existing organizations, the Project Manager Training Devices (PM TRADE) and Project Manager Instrumentation, Targets and Threat Simulators (PM ITTS), plus two new organizations, the Project Manager for Combined Arms Tactical Training (PM CATT) and the Project Manager for Distributed Interactive Simulation (PM DIS).

In the 1990s, the technology base group of STRICOM formed the Technology Development Center (TDC) and moved to a separate building from the rest of STRICOM. One of TDC's major efforts was the University Affiliated Research Center (UARC) at the University of Southern California. The UARC was later renamed the Institute for Creative Technologies (ICT).

On October 1, 2002, TDC provisionally became part of RDECOM, being redesignated U.S. Army Simulation and Training Technology Center (STTC). The remaining elements of STRICOM became the Program Executive Office for Simulation, Training and Instrumentation (PEO STRI). In November 2003, the STTC was renamed in honor of SFC Paul Ray Smith, who was posthumously awarded the Medal of Honor for actions in Operation Iraqi Freedom. RDECOM took permanent control of STTC effective March 1, 2004 in accordance with AMC Permanent Orders 049–2.

The STTC is now a component of the DEVCOM Soldier Center.

== Components ==
=== ICT ===
In 1997, the National Research Council's Report "Modeling and Simulation: Linking Entertainment and Defense" identified a technology opportunity for leveraging DoD and entertainment research. On 10 August 1999, DDRE approved the University of Southern California (USC) Institute for Creative Technologies (ICT) as a US Department of Defense (DoD) University Affiliated Research Center (UARC) as a collaboration between the Army, USC, and the entertainment industry.

The STTC is the executive agent for the Army's partnership with the ICT. As the executive agent, the STTC co-chairs the Technical Advisory Board with a representative from ASA(ALT) to review and execute research topics. STTC plays a major role in identifying opportunities and assisting the ICT with the integration and transition of technologies to the Army.

== See also ==
- Paul Ray Smith
- RDECOM
