= United States Army Materiel Systems Analysis Activity =

Defunct analysis organization (1968–2019)

Coordinates: 39.473451°N 76.140837°W

Army Materiel Systems Analysis Activity
- Logo of AMSAA
- Active: 1 January 1968 – 3 February 2019
- Country: United States
- Branch: Army
- Type: Research and development
- Garrison/HQ: Aberdeen Proving Ground, Maryland

Commanders
- Director: Mr. Jim Amato

The U.S. Army Materiel Systems Analysis Activity (AMSAA) was an analysis organization of the United States Army. AMSAA's overall goal was to provide soldiers with the best U.S. Army materiel possible. AMSAA supported the U.S. Army by conducting systems and engineering analyses to support decisions on technology, materiel acquisitions, and the designing, developing and sustaining of U.S. Army weapon systems.

== History ==
The AMSAA traces its lineage back to the Ballistic Research Laboratory (BRL), established in 1938, where most of the U.S. Army’s early system analysis work was performed during the 1930s-1950s. Over the years, the system analysis group continued to grow in size and importance, until 1 January 1968, when BRL’s Weapons Systems Laboratory became a separate organization. AMSAA’s primary mission was to plan and conduct major systems analyses of proposed and existing U.S. Army weapons/materiel systems, programs and support throughout their life cycle. At APG it was assigned to the Aberdeen Research and Development Center, which included BRL, Human Engineering Laboratories (HEL), Coating and Chemical Laboratory (CCL), and the Nuclear Defense Laboratory (NDL).

During the Vietnam War, AMSAA helped with the decision process to select a new special forces transport helicopter by eliminating deficient models and recommending the most cost-effective one. They also conducted a life-cycle reliability study on several U.S. Army missile systems and saved the Army millions of dollars in premature replacements. AMSAA supported all branches of the service and became the executive agent of the Joint Technical Coordinating Group for Munitions Effectiveness (JTCG/ME), a group formed in the early 1960s that produced weapons effectiveness manuals.

AMSAA was withdrawn from the Aberdeen Research and Development Center in 1972 and reassigned directly to the U.S. Army Materiel Command (AMC). During the 1970s, the AMSAA mission expanded to include the test design and independent evaluation of the development tests of all major, designated non-major and selected other materiel systems as well as product improvements to them. This work covered weapons of all sizes, from tanks to pistols. AMSAA also fielded teams to military units around the world to assess equipment problems. AMSAA developed an interactive war game model that was used by various North Atlantic Treaty Organization (NATO) countries to assess the ways to strengthen their defenses against Soviet artillery for the defense of Europe.

In 1981, AMSAA was assigned the Inventory Research Office, the Logistics Studies Office, and the Procurement Research Office to address the stockpile surveillance mission. This mission included determining the reliability of nuclear and non-nuclear weapons stored around the world. The next year, AMSAA was also assigned the battlefield systems integration mission.

AMSAA took operational control over the Management Engineering Activity in 1998. AMSAA provisionally became part of the U.S. Army Research, Development and Engineering Command (RDECOM) on 1 October 2002. It permanently became part of RDECOM, effective 1 March 2004. Over the years, AMSAA’s mission remained the same, to support decisions on technology, materiel acquisitions, and the designing, developing and sustaining of U.S. Army weapon systems.

=== Transfer to Combat Capabilities Development Command ===
Logo of the Combat Capabilities Development Command

On 3 February 2019, a merger of AMSAA with U.S. Army Research Laboratory's Survivability/Lethality Analysis Directorate (SLAD) and Human Systems Integration (HSI) division (of the Human Research and Engineering Directorate) formed the Combat Capabilities Development Command (CCDC)'s Data and Analysis Center (DAC), also known as CCDC DAC. In 2021, CCDC rebranded to DEVCOM and renamed the CCDC Data and Analysis Center as the DEVCOM Analysis Center (DAC).

== See also ==
- The Research and Analysis Center (TRAC), U.S. Army agency for long-term analysis
