= Simulation-based acquisition =

In the USA the Director for Test Systems Engineering and Evaluation (DTSE&E) commissioned in 1995 a one-year study to assess the effectiveness of the use of M&S in weapon systems acquisition and support processes.

The DTSE&E study developed an approach to acquisition which was named simulation-based acquisition (SBA).

DTSE&E was disestablished by the US Secretary of Defense on 7 June 1999; some functions were transferred to the Director, Operational Test and Evaluation (DOT&E).

== See also ==
- Modeling and Simulation Coordination Office
- Modeling and Simulation Information Analysis Center
- NDIA
