= Synthetic environment =

Computer simulation representing realistic activities

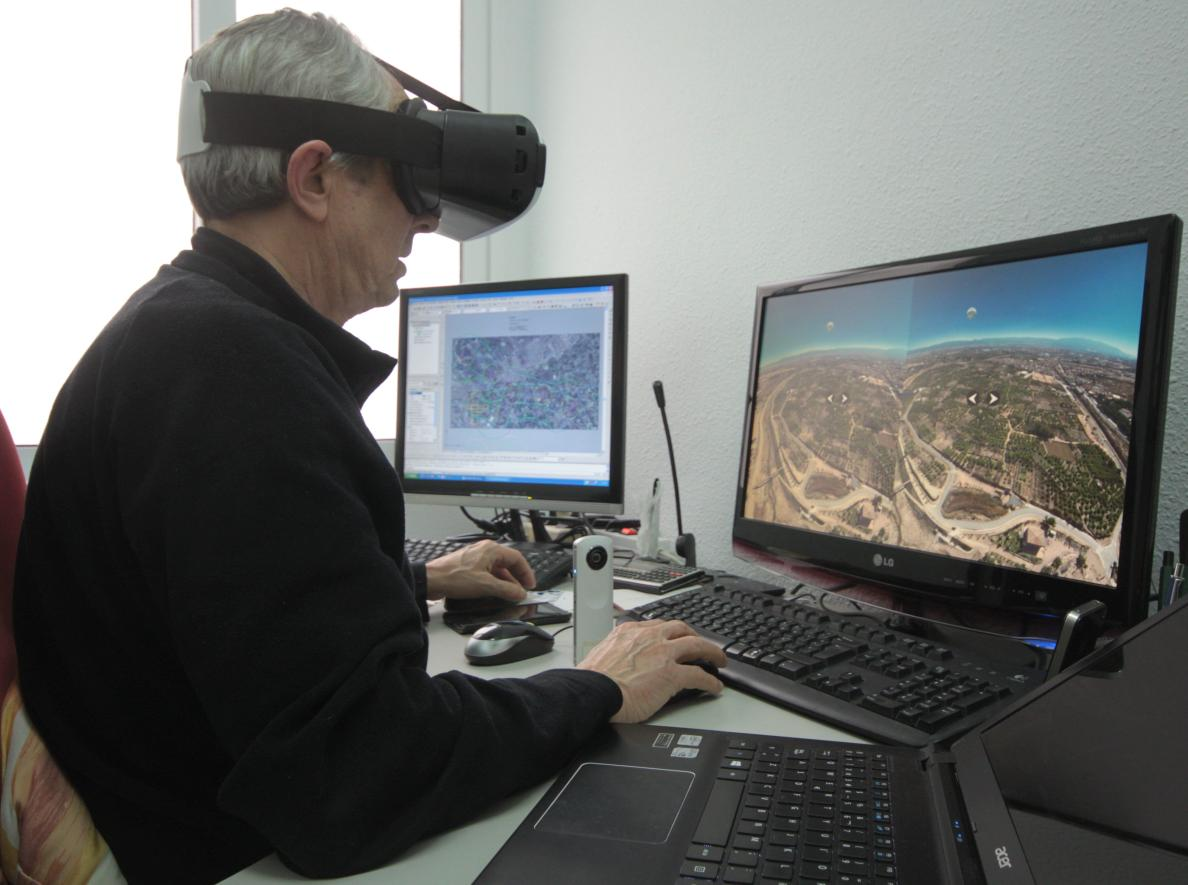

A synthetic environment is a computer simulation that represents activities at a high level of realism, from simulation of theaters of war to factories and manufacturing processes. These environments may be created within a single computer or a vast distributed network connected by local and wide area networks and augmented by super-realistic special effects and accurate behavioral models. SE allows visualization of and immersion into the environment being simulated.

A synthetic environment can be divided into the following:

- Synthetic natural environment – Representation of climate, weather, terrain, oceans, space, etc.
- Synthetic human-made environment – Representation of human-made structures like buildings, bridges, and roads
- Synthetic psychological environment – Representation of psychological influences on individuals and/or groups based on demography and other cultural factors.

== See also ==
- Modeling and simulation
- Glossary of military modeling and simulation
