= Synthetic human-made environment =

In a synthetic environment, the synthetic human-made environment (SHME) is the representation (i.e. modeling) of buildings, bridges, roads, and other man-made structures.

== See also ==
- Glossary of military modeling and simulation
