= Human-in-the-loop =

Software user interface

Human-in-the-loop (HITL) is used in multiple contexts. It can be defined as a model requiring human interaction. HITL is associated with modeling and simulation (M&S) in the live, virtual, and constructive taxonomy. HITL, along with the related human-on-the-loop, are also used in relation to lethal autonomous weapons. Further, HITL is used in the context of machine learning.It is also used in conversational AI to manage complex interactions that require human empathy.

== Machine learning ==
In machine learning, HITL is used in the sense of humans aiding the computer in making the correct decisions in building a model. HITL improves machine learning over random sampling by selecting the most critical data needed to refine the model.

== Simulation ==
In simulation, HITL models may conform to human factors requirements as in the case of a mockup. In this type of simulation, a human is always part of the simulation and consequently influences the outcome in such a way that is difficult if not impossible to reproduce exactly. HITL also readily allows for the identification of problems and requirements that may not be easily identified by other means of simulation.

HITL is often referred to as an interactive simulation, which is a special kind of physical simulation in which physical simulations include human operators, such as in a flight or a driving simulator.

=== Benefits ===
Human-in-the-loop allows the user to change the outcome of an event or process. The immersion effectively contributes to a positive transfer of acquired skills into the real world. This can be demonstrated by trainees utilizing flight simulators in preparation to become pilots.

HITL also allows for the acquisition of knowledge regarding how a new process may affect a particular event. Utilizing HITL allows participants to interact with realistic models and attempt to perform as they would in an actual scenario. HITL simulations bring to the surface issues that would not otherwise be apparent until after a new process has been deployed. A real-world example of HITL simulation as an evaluation tool is its usage by the Federal Aviation Administration (FAA) to allow air traffic controllers to test new automation procedures by directing the activities of simulated air traffic while monitoring the effect of the newly implemented procedures.

As with most processes, there is always the possibility of human error, which can only be reproduced using HITL simulation. Although much can be done to automate systems, humans typically still need to take the information provided by a system to determine the next course of action based on their judgment and experience. Intelligent systems can only go so far in certain circumstances to automate a process; only humans in the simulation can accurately judge the final design. Tabletop simulation may be useful in the very early stages of project development for the purpose of collecting data to set broad parameters, but the important decisions require human-in-the-loop simulation. HITL reflects scenarios where human input remains essential despite advances in automation.

=== Within the virtual simulation taxonomy ===
Virtual simulations inject HITL in a central role by exercising motor control skills (e.g. flying an airplane), decision making skills (e.g. committing fire control resources to action), or communication skills (e.g. as members of a C4I team).

=== Examples ===
- Flight simulators
- Driving simulators
- Marine simulators
- Video games
- Supply chain management simulators
- Digital puppetry

=== Misconceptions ===
Although human-in-the-loop simulation can include a computer simulation in the form of a synthetic environment, computer simulation is not necessarily a form of human-in-the-loop simulation, and is often considered as human-out-of-the loop simulation. In this particular case, a computer model’s behavior is modified according to a set of initial parameters. The results of the model differ from the results stemming from a true human-in-the-loop simulation because the results can easily be replicated time and time again, by simply providing identical parameters.

== Weapons ==
Three classifications of the degree of human control of autonomous weapon systems were laid out by Bonnie Docherty in a 2012 Human Rights Watch report.

- human-in-the-loop: a human must instigate the action of the weapon (in other words not fully autonomous)
- human-on-the-loop: a human may abort an action
- human-out-of-the-loop: no human action is involved

== See also ==
- Humanistic intelligence, which is intelligence that arises by having the human in the feedback loop of the computational process
- Reinforcement learning from human feedback
- MIM-104 Patriot - Examples of a human-on-the-loop lethal autonomous weapon system posing a threat to friendly forces.
