= Modeling and Simulation Coordination Office =

Logo of the Modeling and Simulation Coordination Office

The Modeling and Simulation Coordination Office (M&SCO) was an organization within the United States Department of Defense that coordinated the development of modeling and simulation technology. The M&SCO was named the Defense Modeling and Simulation Office (DMSO) when it was created by Congress in 2006. It was renamed the Modeling and Simulation Coordination Office in late 2007. It was integrated into the Digital Engineering, Modeling and Simulation (DEM&S) group within the Office of the Under Secretary of Defense for Research and Engineering (OUSD(R&E)).

The M&SCO led DoD modeling and simulation standardization efforts. It was the DoD point of contact for coordinating modeling and simulation activities with NATO and Partnership for Peace (PfP) organizations, and provided support to the DoD modeling and simulation management system.

on 30 September 2020 the office was renamed the Modeling and Simulation Enterprise and in July 2022 became Digital Engineering, Modeling and Simulation within the Office of the Executive Director for Systems Engineering & Architecture.
