= Interservice/Industry Training, Simulation and Education Conference =

Industry conference

The Interservice/Industry Training, Simulation and Education Conference (I/ITSEC) is an annual conference in Orlando, Florida organized by the National Training and Simulation Association, an affiliate organization of the National Defense Industrial Association (NDIA). I/ITSEC is held at the Orange County Convention Center, a large conference and exhibition center located on Exhibition Drive on the south side of Orlando, Florida.

== Attendance ==
Peak attendance at I/ITSEC occurred in 2010 and 2011 (see the table in the next section) with approximately 20,000 attendees. Attendance declined to about 14,000 in 2013 and 2014 due to new restrictions with US military and government travel. As a result, conference leaders are taking steps to attract more international attendees, and they have begun expanding I/ITSEC's offerings to appeal to modeling, simulation, and training professionals who work in sectors outside of the defense and security sectors, such as healthcare, civil aviation, transportation, and disaster relief.

I/ITSEC 2020 was cancelled due to the COVID-19 pandemic. This decision had an estimated economic impact of $45M based on the financial impact of previous years. RADM James Robb, USN (Ret), President, National Training and Simulation Association was quoted as follows, "We cancel this year’s I/ITSEC with a heavy heart and are working on ways the technical content prepared for the conference can be provided to the training community,”

== Growth and Evolution ==
The ancestor of I/ITSEC was the “Naval Training Device Center/Industry Conference,” first held in 1966. The conference later expanded to include land, air, and sea systems, and in 1980 its title was changed to reflect this broader scope.

The Orlando area became the predominant location, particularly after construction of the Orange County Convention Center (the second-largest convention complex in the United States). This shift was driven by the availability of nearby hotel accommodations, convenient access via Orlando International Airport, and the development of eastern Orlando and Orange County as the Department of Defense’s primary hub for modeling, simulation, and training. This growth was supported by the establishment of the Central Florida Research Park adjacent to the University of Central Florida, as well as the relocation of various DoD training and simulation activities from the now-closed Naval Training Center Orlando to the newly established Naval Support Activity Orlando within the research park.

DoD activities located at Naval Support Activity Orlando include:

- U.S. Army's Program Executive Office for Simulation, Training and Instrumentation (PEO STRI)
- U.S. Army's Synthetic Training Environment Cross-Functional Team (STE CFT)
- U.S. Army's SFC Paul Ray Smith Simulation and Training Technology Center (STTC)
- U.S. Navy's Naval Air Warfare Center Training Systems Division (NAWCSTD)
- U.S. Marine Corps' Program Manager for Training Systems (PM TRASYS)
- U.S. Air Force's Air Force Agency for Modeling and Simulation (AFAMS)
- U.S. Space Force's modeling, simulation and training activity under the aegis of Space Training and Readiness Command (STARCOM).

With the exception of the aforementioned USAF activities in Orlando, all others have acquisition authority and life cycle program management responsibility for all training systems in their respective services.

=== I/ITSEC attendance figures ===
Below is the history of I/ITSEC locations and attendance from 1980:

I/ITSEC Historical Data
Edition	Year	Exhibitors	Attendance	Venue
40	2019	550	17,400	Orlando, Orange County Exhibition Center
39	2018	491	16,500	Orlando, Orange County Exhibition Center
38	2017	485	15,200	Orlando, Orange County Exhibition Center
37	2016	489	17,100	Orlando, Orange County Exhibition Center
36	2015	470	14,700	Orlando, Orange County Exhibition Center
35	2014	500	14,000	Orlando, Orange County Exhibition Center
34	2013	400	14,000	Orlando, Orange County Exhibition Center
33	2012	561	16,000	Orlando, Orange County Exhibition Center
32	2011	600	20,000	Orlando, Orange County Exhibition Center
31	2010	595	20,000	Orlando, Orange County Exhibition Center
30	2009	550	18,000	Orlando, Orange County Exhibition Center
29	2008	575	17,900	Orlando, Orange County Exhibition Center
28	2007	539	16,000	Orlando, Orange County Exhibition Center
27	2006	500	16,000	Orlando, Orange County Exhibition Center
26	2005	500	17,000	Orlando, Orange County Exhibition Center
25	2004	480	16,000	Orlando, Orange County Exhibition Center
24	2003	495	14,000	Orlando, Orange County Exhibition Center
23	2002	460	14,000	Orlando, Orange County Exhibition Center
22	2001	429	12,000	Orlando, Orange County Exhibition Center
21	2000	417	14,000	Orlando, Orange County Exhibition Center
20	1999	347	12,000	Orlando, Orange County Exhibition Center
19	1998	341	3,000	Orlando, Orange County Exhibition Center
18	1997	248	3,000	Orlando, Marriott
17	1996	242	3,300	Orlando, Marriott
16	1995	229	2,700	Albuquerque, New Mexico
15	1994	212	2,608	Orlando, Marriott
14	1993	191	2,003	Orlando, Marriott
13	1992	157	1,985	San Antonio, Texas
12	1991	162	1,954	Orlando, Marriott
11	1990	165	1,415	Orlando, Marriott
10	1989	187	1,700	Fort Worth, Texas
9	1988	161	1,861	Orlando, Marriott
8	1987	96	1,976	Washington, D.C.
7	1986	115	1,583	Salt Lake City, Utah
6	1985	96	1,976	Orlando, Sheraton
5	1984	97	1,498	Washington, D.C., Hilton
4	1983	84	1,334	Washington, D.C., Hilton
3	1982	84	1,469	Orlando, Hyatt
2	1981	57	1,142	Orlando, Sheraton
1	1980	39	885	Salt Lake City, Utah

== Exhibit Hall ==
The conference includes an exhibit hall, which typically encompasses approximately 200,000+ square feet and features more than 50+ organizations and agencies. In addition to commercial vendors, academic institutions and military organizations regularly maintain exhibit booths. Many organizations also bring live demonstrations of their technologies.

Previous exhibit displays have included computer-based 3D graphics; flight simulators (fixed-wing, rotary-wing, and tilt-rotor); Live, Virtual, and Constructive (LVC) training systems for air-to-air and air-to-ground weapon ranges; armored vehicle and tank crew simulators; convoy trainers; aircraft and vehicle maintenance trainers; dismounted small-unit ground combat simulators; command and control center simulations; first-person shooter simulators; shipboard simulators; virtual reality and augmented reality (VR/AR), SCORM, information technology, advanced distributed learning, aerospace, communications, and public safety training systems.

Annually, the NTSA publishes short video clips highlighting notable booths on its YouTube channel: https://www.youtube.com/user/NTSAToday

== Papers, Tutorials, and Workshops ==
Each year, I/ITSEC requests submissions for papers and tutorials to be presented at its annual conference. In 2025, the conference featured 122 Technical Papers, 33 Tutorials, and 9 Professional Development Workshops. The peer-reviewed process spans half a year as prospective authors must pass multiple quality assurance gates. Authors must first submit an abstract to one of the six sub-committees: education, emerging concepts and innovative technologies, human systems engineering, simulation, training, or the policy, standards, management, and acquisition subcommittee. Each subcommittee consists of government, industry, and academic members. At the abstract meeting, each submission is carefully considered and either accepted or rejected. If accepted, the full paper submission is required a few months later to again be reviewed and either accepted or rejected. Lastly, accepted authors must prepare presentations that are again reviewed by committee members. Abstract submission typically opens in February each year with full, accepted papers due sometime in June and presentations due around September.

If accepted, authors present their tutorials on the first day of the conference (always held on a Monday). Speakers present their papers during concurrent sessions, held across the subsequent three days of the conference (Tuesday-Thursday). Finally, on the last day of the conference, invited speakers present special workshops, which are like the Monday tutorials but longer. Typically, each conference includes more than 160 of these educational sessions or special events. Attendees can earn Continuing Education Units (CEUs) at the tutorials, the professional development workshops, and all paper sessions.

== Special Events ==
Each year, I/ITSEC hosts a series of special events that reflect emerging topics in modeling and simulation, training and education. These special events are developed by the committee members who organize the conference, and participants are invited rather than required to complete the peer-reviewed paper or tutorial submission process.

In 2025, the conference featured 49 Special Events. These events are a mix of Signature Events, Floor Events, and Focus Events covering topics such as live, virtual, and constructive (LVC) simulation; predicting and managing Black Swan events; artificial intelligence for social interaction simulation; transmedia learning; geospatial environment database standards; cybersecurity; and an Ignite (event) session featuring invited speakers.

These special events frequently involve panel discussions, often including high-ranking military officers and senior civilian officials as invited panelists. For example, each year the conference includes the “Congressional Modeling and Simulation Event,” during which elected officials discuss modeling and simulation policies. Similarly, the “General/Flag Officer Panel” features active-duty military officers and government civilians from the general/flag officer or Senior Executive Service (SES) levels, often including service chiefs and/or service secretaries.

== Serious Games Showcase and Challenge ==
The Serious Games Showcase and Challenge is a competition and a showcase event that was created to encourage video game developers to create products that are useful for non-entertainment purposes. The annual event, made its first appearance as an exhibit space at I/ITSEC in 2006. The event accepts games from universities, businesses, and government organizations as entries in competition for awards prizes. Each year the event awards a Special Emphasis Award, Students’ Choice Award, Best Business Game, Best Student Game, Best Government Game, Best Mobile Game, and finally, attendees at the conference can also vote on the People's Choice Award.

== Awards and Scholarships ==
=== Best Paper and Best Tutorial Awards ===
I/ITSEC presents annual awards in the following areas:

- Best paper per subcommittee
- Overall best paper, selected from the best papers from each subcommittee
- Best tutorial

Below are the Best Paper and Best Tutorial winners for the past 10 years. To see the full archive of winners, see the Best Paper and Best Tutorial I/ITSEC page.

Year	Best Paper	Author(s)
2019	Simulating Augmented Reality Spatial Accuracy Requirements for Target Acquisition Tasks	John Graybeal, Rachel Nguyen, Todd Du Bosq
2018	Understanding Cloud-Based Visual System Architectures	Jeanette Ling
2017	Human Systems and Instructional System Design for a Simulator of a Robotic Surgical System	Danielle Julian, Roger Smith, Ph.D., Alyssa Tanaka, Ariel Dubin
2016	Human Performance Analysis and Engineering: Novel Process for Developing Metrics that Measure what Police Do	Bryan Vila, Ph.D., Stephen James, Ph.D., Lois James, Ph.D.
2015	Cyber Operational Architecture Training System (COATS) - Cyber for All	David Wells, Ph.D., U.S. Pacific Command's Cyber War Innovation Center, Derek Bryan
2014	Institutionalizing Blended Learning into Joint Training: A Case Study and Ten Recommendations	David Fautua, Ph.D., Sae Schatz, Ph.D., Emilie Reitz, Patricia Bockelman
2013	Medical Holography for Basic Anatomy Training	Matthew Hackett, ARL/HRED STTC
2012	Making Good Instructors Great: USMC Cognitive Readiness and Instructor Professionalization Initiatives	Sae Schatz, Ph.D., Kathleen Bartlett, Nicole Burley, MESH Solutions; Capt David Dixon, USMC, Kenneth A. Knarr, LtCol Karl Gannon, USMC
2011	A Game AI Approach to Autonomous Control of Virtual Characters	by Kevin Dill, Lockheed Martin
2010	Simulated Clinical Environments and Virtual System-of-Systems Engineering for Health Care	Frank Boosman, Robert J. Szczerba, Ph.D., Lockheed Martin

Year	Best Tutorial	Authors
2019	Superforecasting: Proven Practices for Leveraging Human Ingenuity	S.K. Numrich, Ph.D.
2018	The Science of Thrills: M&S in the Entertainment Industry	Kevin F. Hulme, Ph.D, CMSP, Emmanuel Torres Gil, Chistopher Hendrick, Shathushan Sivashangaran
2017	The Essential Guide to Cyberspace Training	David Wells, Ph.D., U.S. Pacific Command's Cyber War Innovation Center, Derek Bryan
2016	Virtual Reality: Challenges and Solutions for Useful Simulation Training	Thomas Talbot, M.D., Skip Rizzo, Ph.D., USC Institute for Creative Technologies
2015	Elevate your Instruction: Practical Methods to Maximize Military Learning	Sae Schatz, Ph.D., Advanced Distributed Learning (ADL)
2014	Bridging the Gap: How to Build Effective Game-based Training	Cannon-Bowers, Ph.D., Clint Bowers, Ph.D., Katelyn Procci, Skilan Ortiz, Jennifer Loglia, Budd C. Darling, III, Cubic Advanced Learning Solutions
2013	Model Verification and Validation Methods	Mikel D. Petty, Ph.D. University of Alabama in Huntsville
2012	Distributed Simulation Fundamentals	by Margaret L. Loper, Ph.D., Georgia Tech Research Institute
2011	Why Games Work—The Science of Learning	by Curtiss Murphy, Alion Science and Technology
2010	Return on Investment (ROI)	by Edward J. Degnan, Ph.D., LTC USA Ret, Air Force Agency for Modeling and Simulation

=== Outstanding Achievement Awards ===
The NTSA confers professional achievement awards at the I/ITSEC conference to individuals, organizations, or project teams that have made significant contributions to the M&S discipline. These include the following categories: training, analysis, acquisition, cross-function (multiple uses), and individual/lifetime achievement.

=== I/ITSEC Fellows ===
The NTSA established a Fellows recognition award in 2010. Conference leaders bestow the "I/ITSEC Fellow" title to an influential person whose contributions have fundamentally shaped contemporary simulation and training capabilities. Individuals receive this recognition by being nominated and meeting conference leadership's standards for merit; consequently, the number of Fellow awards varies by year.

I/ITSEC Fellows
Year	Name
2025	Robert Sottilare, Ph.D.
2024	Winston “Wink” Bennett, Ph.D.
2023	James Wall, Ph.D.
2022	Warren Katz
2021	LTC Frederick E. “Fred” Hartman, USA (Ret.)
2019	Richard Fujimoto, Ph.D.
2018	S.K. “Sue” Numrich, Ph.D., CMSP
2017	Henry C. “Hank” Okraski
2015	Duncan (Duke) Miller, Ph.D.
2014	Andy Ceranowicz, Ph.D.
2013	Colonel James E. Shiflett, USA (Ret)
2011	General Paul F. Gorman, USA (Ret)
2010	Colonel Jack Thorpe, USAF (Ret), Ph.D.
2010	Paul K. Davis, Ph.D.

=== Postgraduate and Undergraduate Student Scholarships ===
Since 1990, the conference has awarded academic scholarships to graduate students. In 2019, the conference started to award scholarships to undergraduate students as well.

== Outreach ==
During I/ITSEC, the NTSA conducts outreach to students and teachers, primarily from the K-12 Science, Technology, Engineering, and Mathematics (STEM) fields. Outreach programs include the following:

- America's Teachers Program: Sponsors the travel and conference attendance for K-12 teachers and school administrators
- Future Leaders Pavilion: Exhibit hall venue for secondary school students to demonstrate technical projects they have developed in modeling, simulation and training topics
- Student Tours: Guided tours of the conference, designed for school field trips

== See also ==
- Simulation
- modeling
- Military Simulation
- Simulation Interoperability Standards Organization
- MORS
- Operations Research
- NDIA
