= Central Florida =

Coordinates: 28°55′37″N 81°43′17″W

- Region
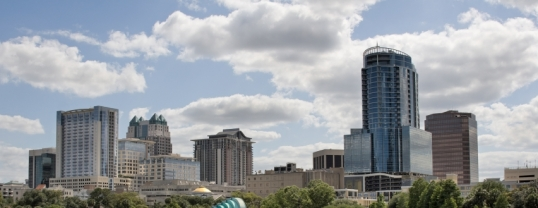
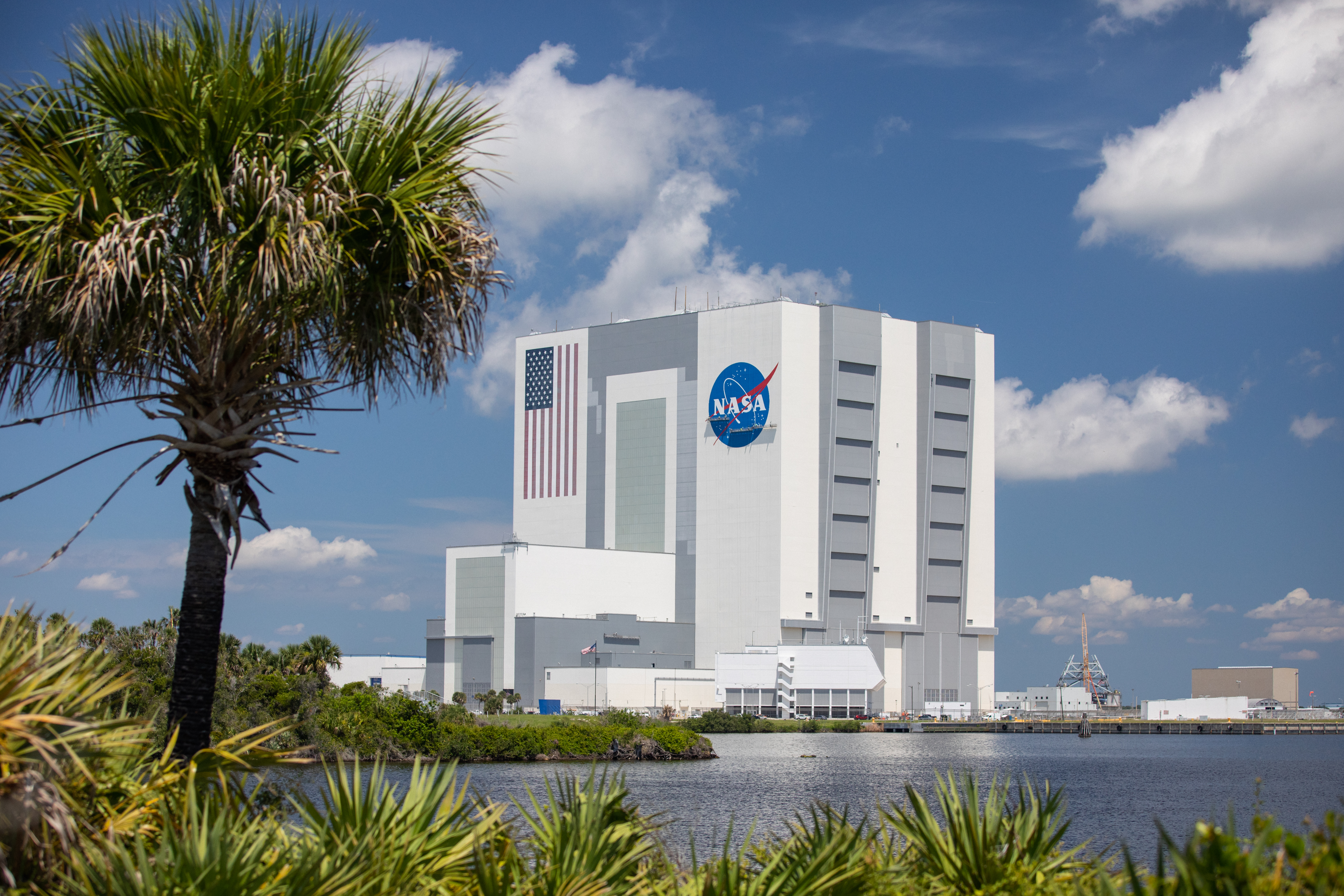
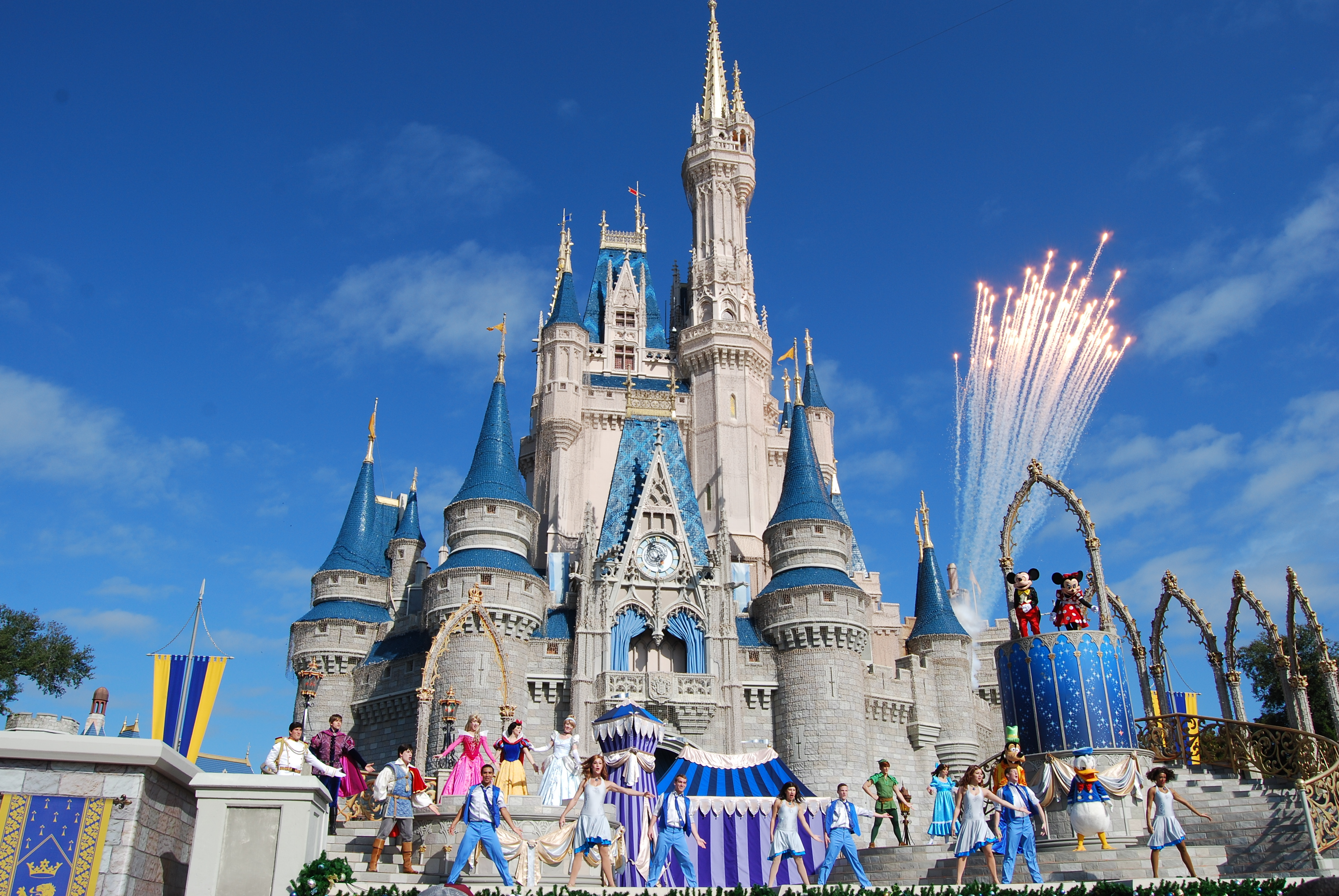
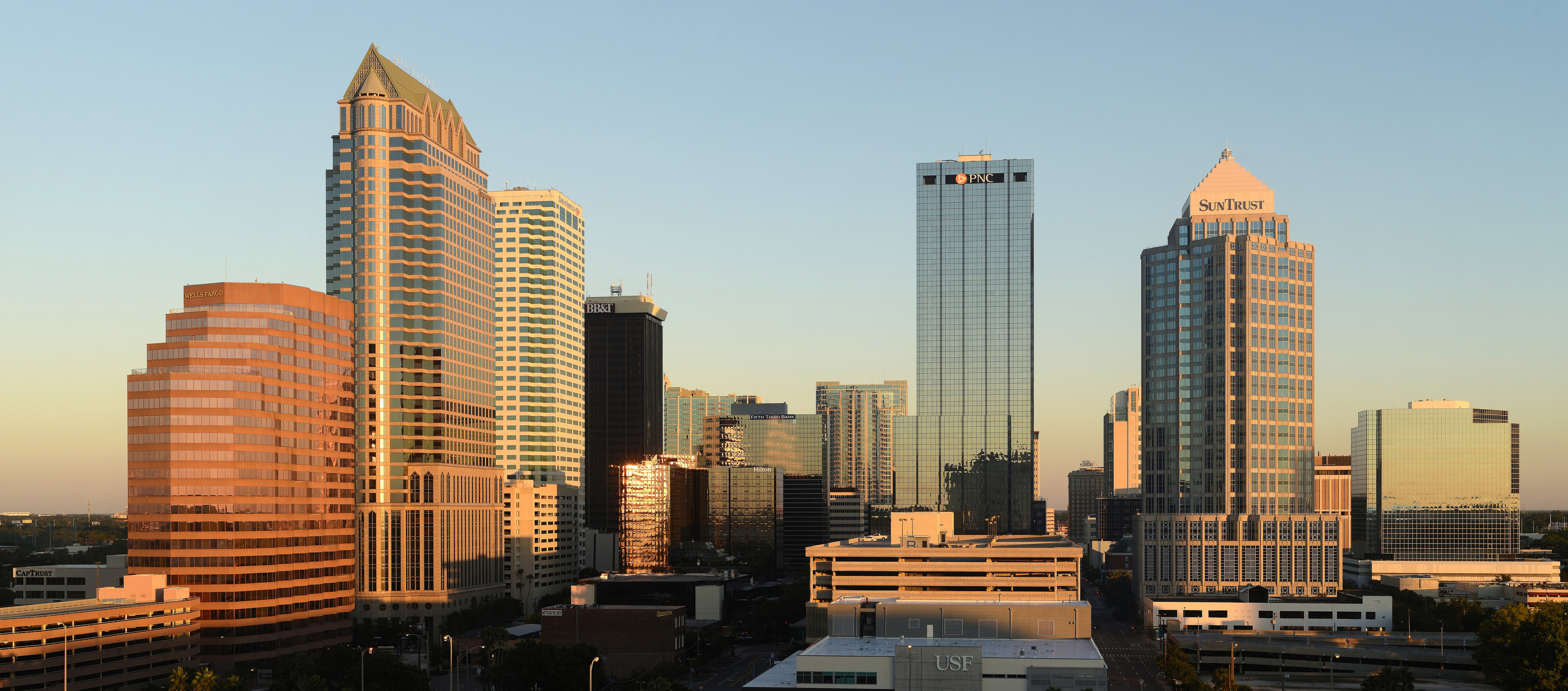
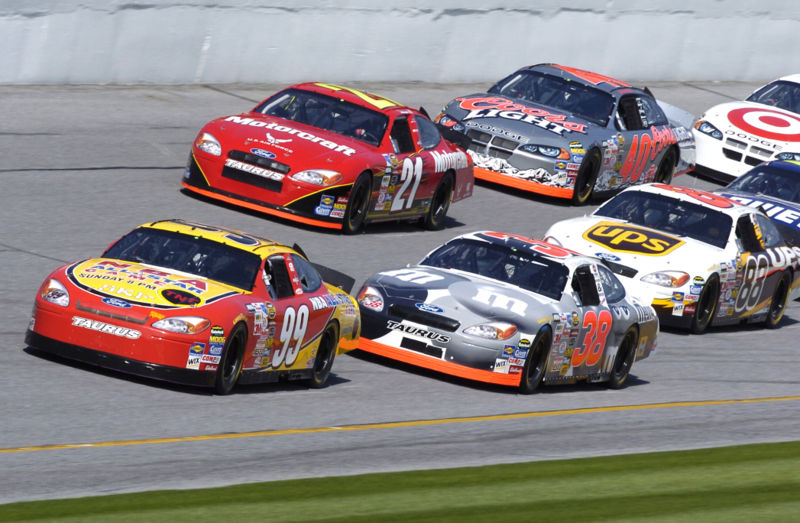
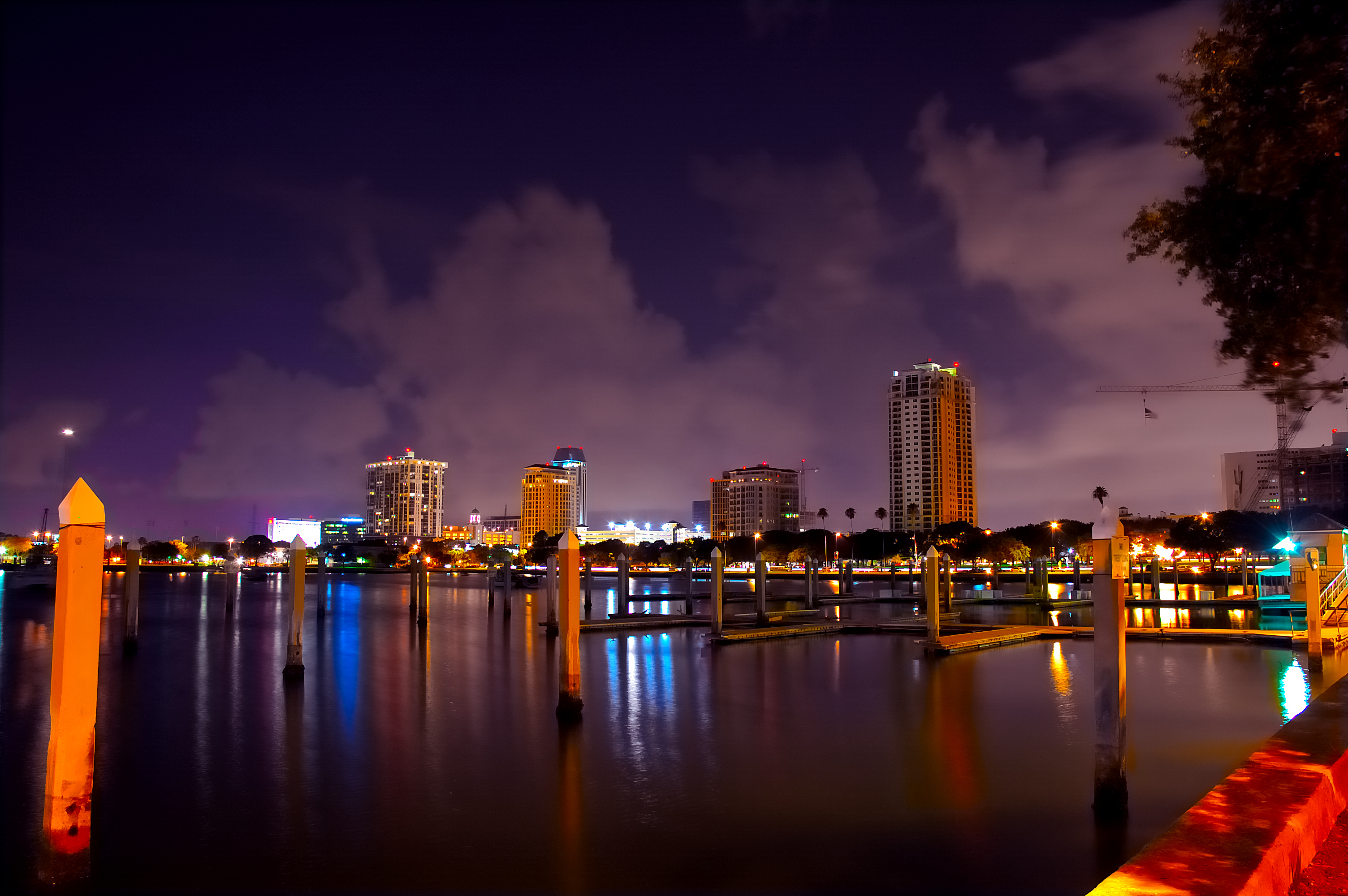
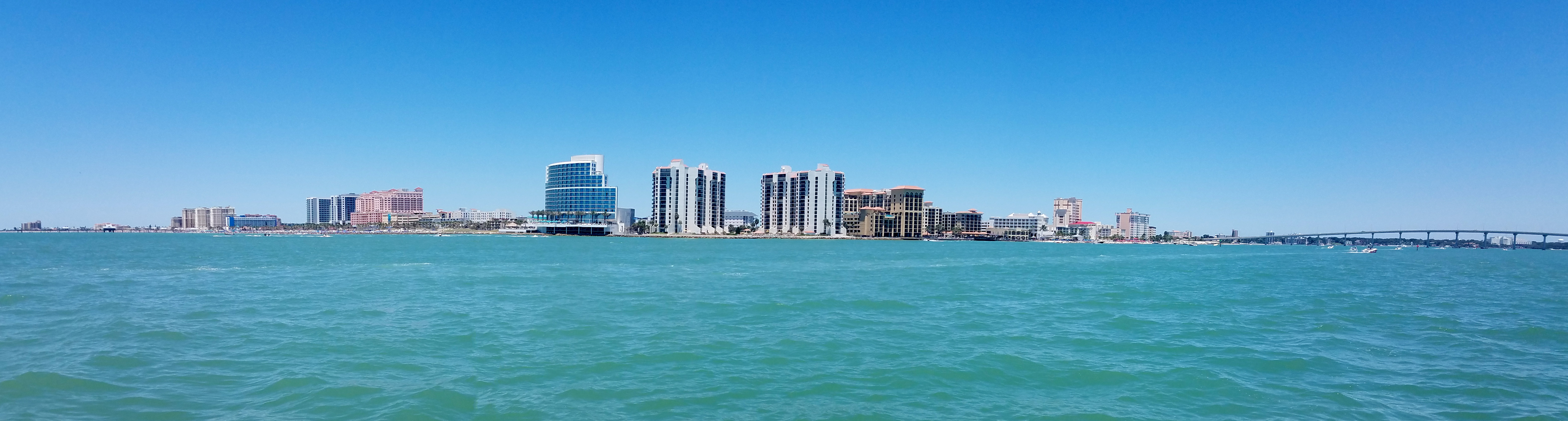
- Central Florida Images top from bottom, left to right: Downtown Orlando Skyline, Kennedy Space Center, Walt Disney World, Downtown Tampa Skyline, Daytona International Speedway, St. Petersburg, and Clearwater Beach

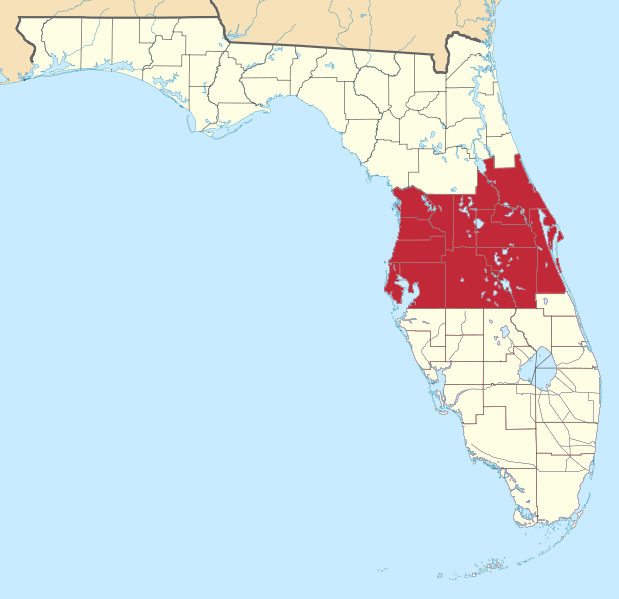
- Central Florida, part of the Florida megaregion
- Country: United States
- State: Florida
- Largest city: Tampa

Population (2025)
  - Total: 8,875,037

Central Florida is a region of the U.S. state of Florida. Different sources give different definitions for the region, but as its name implies it is usually said to comprise the central part of the state, including the Tampa Bay area and the Greater Orlando area, though in recent times the Tampa Bay area has often been described as its own region, with "Central Florida" becoming more synonymous with the Orlando area (most notably, this is what the local news channels in each respective metro area call their region).

Between July 1, 2023, and July 1, 2024, the Orlando metropolitan statistical area, which lies in Central Florida, grew by 2.7%, adding about 75,969 new residents. This made it the fastest-growing large metro region in the United States by percentage during that year.

It is one of Florida's three directional regions, along with North Florida and South Florida. Under the previously mentioned "usual" definition, it includes the following 13 counties: Brevard, Citrus, Hernando, Hillsborough, Lake, Orange, Osceola, Pasco, Pinellas, Polk, Seminole, Sumter, and Volusia. Sometimes Ocala, which is in Marion County, was included. Although Citrus, Hernando, Hillsborough, Pasco, and Pinellas are also considered to be the Tampa Bay area.

== Sports ==
Sports in the central Florida area includes eight major professional sports teams which are the Tampa Bay Buccaneers of the NFL, Tampa Bay Lightning of the NHL, Tampa Bay Rays of the MLB, Orlando Magic of the NBA, Orlando City SC of the MLS, Orlando Pride of the NWSL, Orlando Valkyries of the MLV, and Orlando Storm of the UFL.

Former teams are the Orlando Miracle of the WNBA, Orlando Guardians of the XFL, Orlando Thunder of the WLAF, Orlando Renegades of the USFL, Florida Blazers of the WFL, Orlando Apollos of the AAF.

Team	Founded	Stadium	League	Championships
Tampa Bay Buccaneers	1976	Raymond James Stadium	NFL	2: 2002 (XXXVII), 2020 (LV)
Tampa Bay Lightning	1992	Benchmark International Arena	NHL	3: 2004, 2020, 2021
Tampa Bay Rays	1998	Tropicana Field	MLB	0
Orlando Magic	1989	Kia Center	NBA	0
Orlando City SC	2010	Inter.co Stadium	MLS	0
Orlando Pride	2015	Inter.co Stadium	NWSL	0
Orlando Valkyries	2023	Addition Financial Arena	MLV	1: 2025
Orlando Storm	2026	Inter.co Stadium	UFL	0

== Geography ==
Like many vernacular regions, Central Florida's boundaries are not official or consistent, and are defined differently by different sources. A 2007 study of Florida's regions by geographers Ary Lamme and Raymond K. Oldakowski found that Floridians surveyed identified Central Florida as comprising a large swath of peninsular Florida. This area encompassed the interior, including the Orlando metropolitan area, and coastal stretches from the Citrus County south to the Hillsborough County in the west and from Volusia County south to Sebastian in the east.

Central Florida is one of Florida's three most common directional regions, the others being North Florida and South Florida. Lamme and Oldakowski note that the directional region is more commonly used in the interior areas rather than on the coast. In fact, while coastal areas often have their own regional vernacular identities such as the Space Coast and the Nature Coast, no vernacular regions were reported on the interior of the state other than Central Florida.

Enterprise Florida, the state's economic development agency, identifies "Central Florida" as one of eight economic regions used by the agency and other state and outside entities, including the Florida Department of Transportation. This definition covers much of the same area as in Lamme and Oldakowski's survey, with some exceptions. The central region includes the Orlando metropolitan area (Orange, Lake, Osceola, and Seminole counties), and Sumter, Polk counties in the interior, Citrus, Hernando, Hillsborough, Pasco, and Pinellas counties on the west coast and Volusia and Brevard counties on the east coast.

The central cities of both metropolitan areas (Orlando and Tampa) are in close proximity (85 miles (137 km)), and as a result, their two metropolitan areas blend together in the area of Lakeland to make up a larger contiguous population center often referred to as the I-4 corridor. This is a population concentration that stretches from Tampa Bay on the west coast to Daytona Beach and Cape Canaveral on the east coast of the state.

With the exception of hill terrain in Mount Dora, southern Lake County, Polk County (Lake Wales Ridge) Pasco County, and Hernando County (Brooksville Ridge). Central Florida is mostly flatland with significant amounts of open space and over 1,500 lakes and ponds. There is a mixture of wetlands, Cypress, Oak, Maple and Pine forests, pastures, prairies and coastline.

Major rivers include the St. Johns River, the Halifax River, the Ocklawaha River and the Econlockhatchee River. Major lakes include Lake Apopka, Lake Tohopekaliga, East Lake Tohopekaliga, Lake Louisa, Lake Monroe, Lake Jessup, and the Butler Chain of Lakes. There are over 100 miles (160 km) of coastline in Central Florida along the Atlantic Coast. Major beaches include Canaveral National Seashore, New Smyrna Beach, Daytona Beach, Cocoa Beach, and Indialantic Beach near Melbourne.

=== Climate ===
Hurricanes are a threat to the coastal cities as evidenced by the 2004 hurricane season, which brought three major hurricanes to the Central Florida area: Charley, Jeanne, and Frances.

Historic Cypress Gardens, (now Lego-Land) in central Florida.

Winters are dry and temperate with the average winter high temperature in Orlando being 71 °F (22 °C) and the average winter low temperature being 49 °F (9 °C). Summers are hot and humid with high temperatures averaging 92 °F (33 °C) and low temperatures averaging 75 °F (24 °C). Peak summer heat generally arrives in early June and continues to early October.

The combination of high temperatures, high humidity, and opposing sea breezes from both the Gulf and Atlantic coasts, results in significant thunderstorm activity from June to September for the interior counties. Central Florida records more lightning strikes per area than any other region in Florida, and Florida records more lightning strikes than any other state in the US. As a result, Florida, and more specifically, Central Florida, is often referred to as the "Thunderstorm capital of the USA", or "Lightning Alley."

These severe thunderstorms often make Central Florida prone to many tornadoes. However, they are usually small, short lived, and almost always rated as EF0 or EF1 size storms.

According to the Köppen climate classification, Central Florida has a subtropical climate. A climate that is typical for the majority of the state, except for South Florida, which has a tropical climate. Unlike South Florida, where temperatures below 32 °F (0 °C) practically never occur, Central Florida can see occasional freezing temperatures in the some winters (though brief). Consequently, most of Central Florida cannot accommodate the same tropical plants found in Southern Florida with the exception of coastal areas in the Tampa Bay area, Brevard county, and Indian River county due to maritime influences of the Gulf of Mexico and Atlantic Ocean. However, winters are still warmer than most other areas of the United States in winter. Central Florida’s typical high temperatures in the winter are around 70 °F (21 °C). The low temperatures near 50 F.

Climate data for Orlando (Orlando International Airport), Florida (1991–2020 normals, extremes 1952–present)
Month	Jan	Feb	Mar	Apr	May	Jun	Jul	Aug	Sep	Oct	Nov	Dec	Year
Record high °F (°C)	87 (31)	89 (32)	93 (34)	97 (36)	100 (38)	100 (38)	101 (38)	100 (38)	98 (37)	95 (35)	91 (33)	90 (32)	101 (38)
Mean maximum °F (°C)	83.5 (28.6)	85.5 (29.7)	88.4 (31.3)	91.1 (32.8)	94.5 (34.7)	96.1 (35.6)	96.1 (35.6)	95.4 (35.2)	93.8 (34.3)	91.0 (32.8)	86.7 (30.4)	83.7 (28.7)	97.2 (36.2)
Mean daily maximum °F (°C)	71.8 (22.1)	74.9 (23.8)	78.9 (26.1)	83.6 (28.7)	88.4 (31.3)	90.8 (32.7)	92.0 (33.3)	91.6 (33.1)	89.6 (32.0)	84.7 (29.3)	78.3 (25.7)	73.8 (23.2)	83.2 (28.4)
Daily mean °F (°C)	60.6 (15.9)	63.6 (17.6)	67.3 (19.6)	72.2 (22.3)	77.3 (25.2)	81.2 (27.3)	82.6 (28.1)	82.6 (28.1)	81.0 (27.2)	75.5 (24.2)	68.2 (20.1)	63.3 (17.4)	73.0 (22.8)
Mean daily minimum °F (°C)	49.5 (9.7)	52.4 (11.3)	55.8 (13.2)	60.7 (15.9)	66.3 (19.1)	71.6 (22.0)	73.2 (22.9)	73.7 (23.2)	72.4 (22.4)	66.2 (19.0)	58.2 (14.6)	52.9 (11.6)	62.7 (17.1)
Mean minimum °F (°C)	33.2 (0.7)	36.5 (2.5)	41.3 (5.2)	49.2 (9.6)	58.2 (14.6)	67.5 (19.7)	70.5 (21.4)	70.7 (21.5)	67.8 (19.9)	53.4 (11.9)	44.4 (6.9)	37.6 (3.1)	31.3 (−0.4)
Record low °F (°C)	19 (−7)	26 (−3)	25 (−4)	38 (3)	48 (9)	53 (12)	64 (18)	65 (18)	57 (14)	43 (6)	32 (0)	20 (−7)	19 (−7)
Average precipitation inches (mm)	2.48 (63)	2.04 (52)	3.03 (77)	2.58 (66)	4.02 (102)	8.05 (204)	7.46 (189)	7.69 (195)	6.37 (162)	3.46 (88)	1.79 (45)	2.48 (63)	51.45 (1,307)
Average precipitation days (≥ 0.01 in)	7.0	6.4	6.8	6.3	8.4	16.2	17.1	17.2	14.2	8.4	6.0	7.1	121.1
Source: NOAA

== History ==
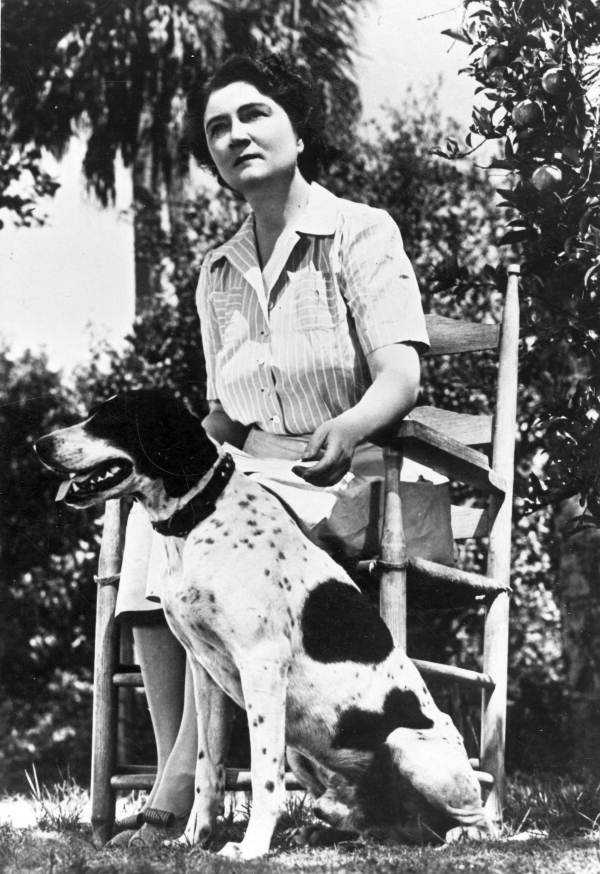
The Yearling won Floridian Marjorie Kinnan Rawlings a Pulitzer Prize for her glimpse at life in central Florida.

At the end of the Civil War, aside from the cattle, cotton, and coastal lands, much of Central Florida was wetlands. It took a major drainage project financed by businessman Hamilton Disston in the 1880s to make these wetland areas available for settlement.

Sanford was incorporated in 1877 as a port city at the Lake Monroe intersection and the St. Johns River. It was envisioned as a transportation center; the city's founder, Henry S. Sanford, nicknamed it "the Gate City of South Florida". It became a hub for shipping agricultural products, which earned the city another nickname, "Celery City".

Kissimmee, originally named Allendale, after Confederate Major J.H. Allen, who operated the first cargo steamboat on the Kissimmee River, boomed in the 1880s. It was the headquarters of Hamilton Disston's drainage company. The city was an important regional steamship port, owing that status to its location on Lake Tohopekaliga. Expanding the railroads into Central Florida eliminated the need for Kissimmee's steamship industry.

The Great Freeze of 1894–1895 ruined citrus crops, which had a detrimental ripple effect on the economy.

The hard-packed sand of Volusia County's beaches lent itself to auto races beginning in 1903 before paved roads were common, leading to the area's reputation for cars and racing. Ormond Beach was a popular spot for those who liked fast cars after the turn of the 20th century because the hard-packed beach was ideal for going fast. The same beach had led to the development of a tourist resort by Henry Flagler. It later attracted Flagler's former business partner John D. Rockefeller, who had a winter home in Ormond.

During and after World War II, the U.S. Army Air Forces (U.S. Air Force after 1947) and the U.S. Navy established several training facilities and operational bases in the region, mainly for aviation activities, followed by space exploration sites. In the late 1940s, the U.S. military established a missile testing facility on Merritt Island near Cape Canaveral. The land was largely undeveloped and the agreeable climate allowed for year-round operations. When NASA later searched for a long-term base in the 1960s to launch spacecraft, it chose the Merritt Island site next to Cape Canaveral for its access to the testing facility and nearby communities. NASA purchased over 100,000 acres (400 km^{2}) of land for the Kennedy Space Center.

Deltona was developed in 1962 as a planned retirement community. It is now the largest city in Volusia County.

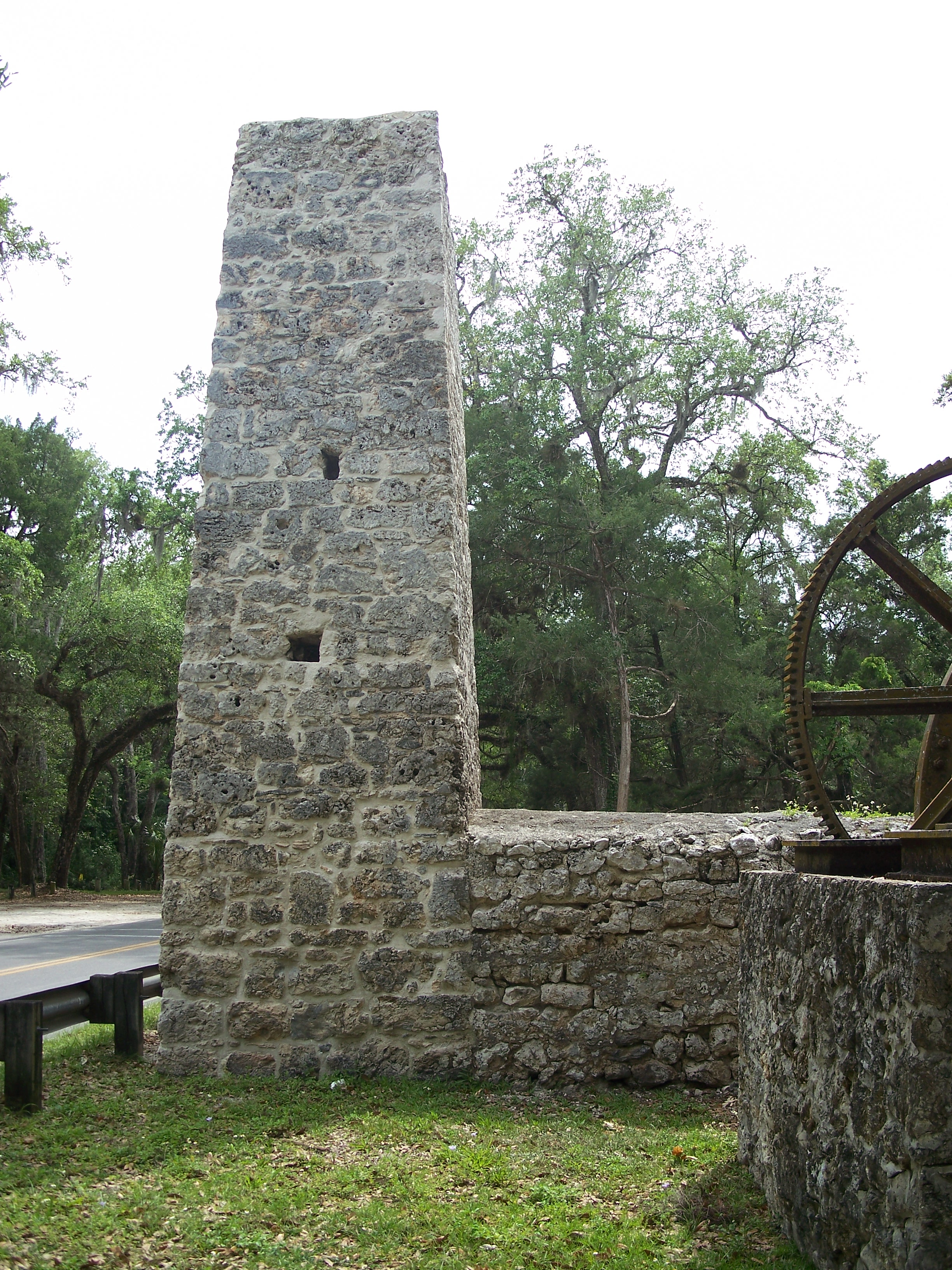
Yulee Sugar Mill, located in the Central Florida town of Homosassa. The Florida State Park is the site of David Levy Yulee's 5,100-acre sugar plantation. The mill operated from 1851 to 1864 and served as a supplier of sugar products for Southern troops during the Civil War.

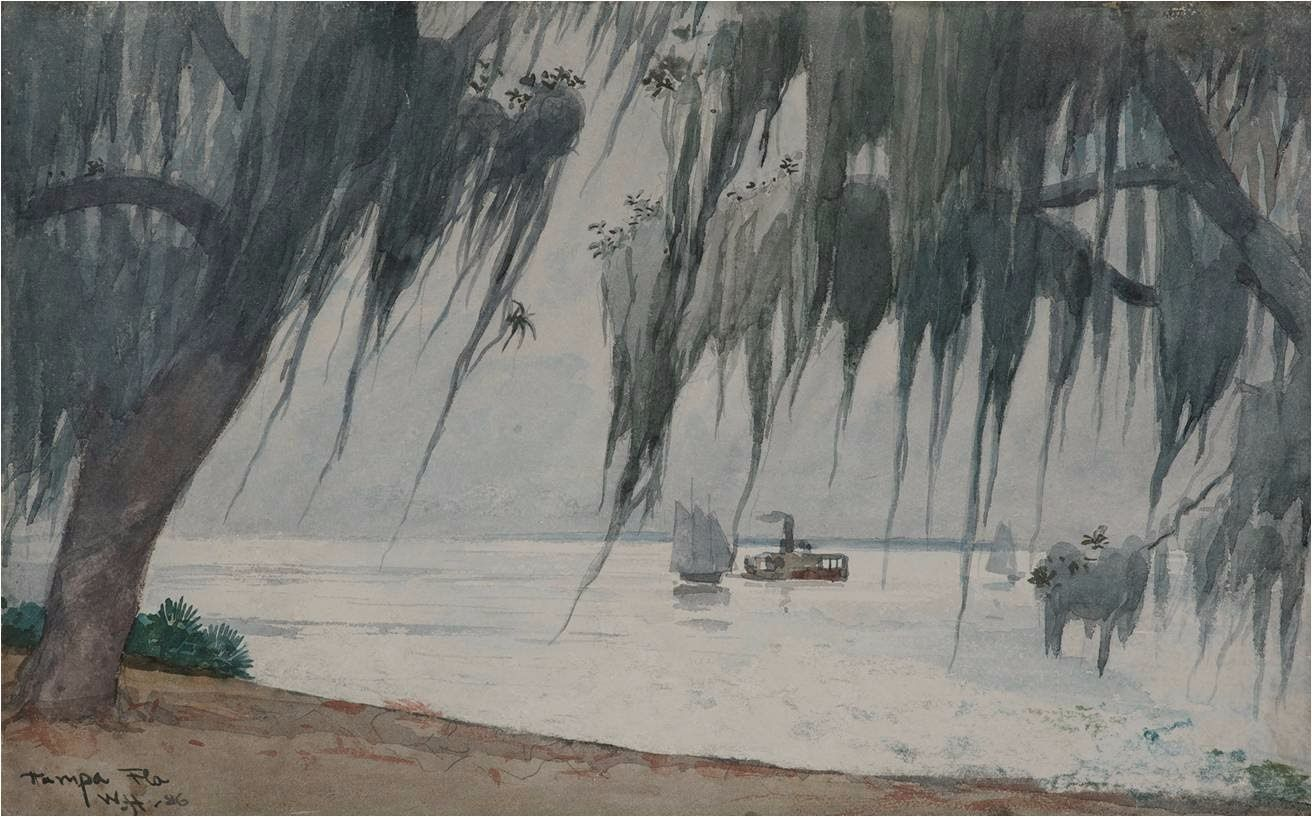
Spanish Moss by Winslow Homer, Tampa Bay, a painting of Spanish Moss swaying from live oak limbs, a familiar scene in central Florida

The construction of the Walt Disney World Resort was a transforming event for greater Orlando. Walt Disney wanted a location with abundant available land that was more accessible for the residents of the eastern United States to visit. Not only was there ample land in Central Florida, but it was inexpensive, and the inland location offered some protection from hurricanes. Plans were announced in 1965, and the theme park opened to the public in 1971.

== Culture and attributes ==
Lamme and Oldakowski's survey identifies several demographic, political, and cultural elements that characterize Central Florida and distinguish it from other areas of the state. While people from all parts of the state associated their area as part of the South, people in the southern part of Central Florida did not typically identify their area as part of "Dixie", while people in northern Central Florida did. People from Central Florida usually did not consider their region part of the Bible Belt.

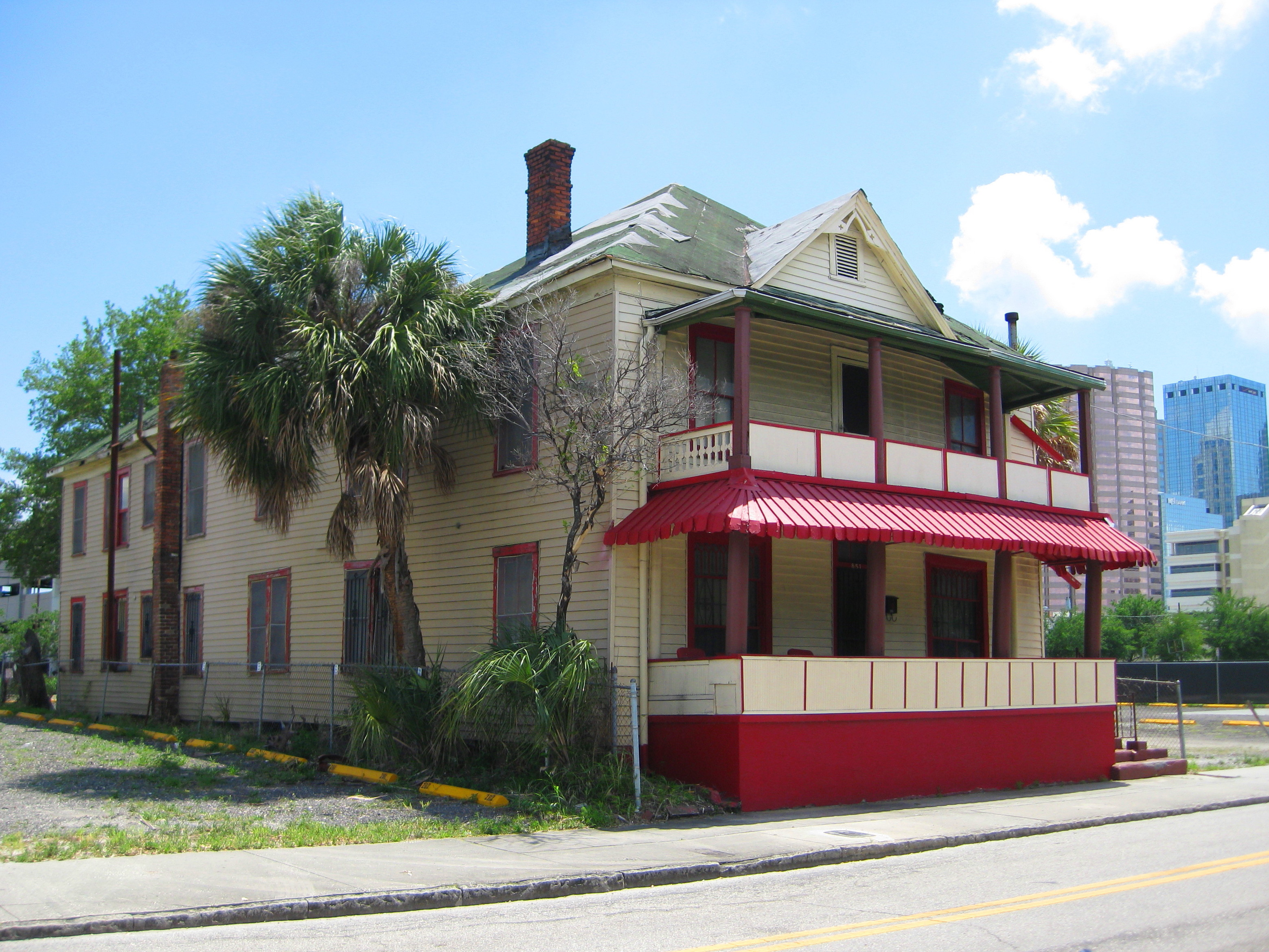
Jackson Rooming House in Tampa, accommodated African-Americans during the era of racial segregation in central Florida. The hotel played host to prominent figures such as Count Basie, Cab Calloway, James Brown, Ella Fitzgerald, and Ray Charles.

Politically, while North Florida overwhelmingly was considered conservative and South Florida was considered more liberal, the majority of Central Florida residents (52%) considered their area moderate; 41% considered it conservative, and 7% liberal. Lamme and Oldakowski's survey tracks with Barney Warf and Cynthia Waddell's studies of Florida's political geography during the 2000 Presidential election. Central Florida's economy is very similar to that in South Florida. Compared to the more diversified North Florida economy, tourism is by far the most significant industry in Central and South Florida, along with a much smaller but significant agricultural industry.

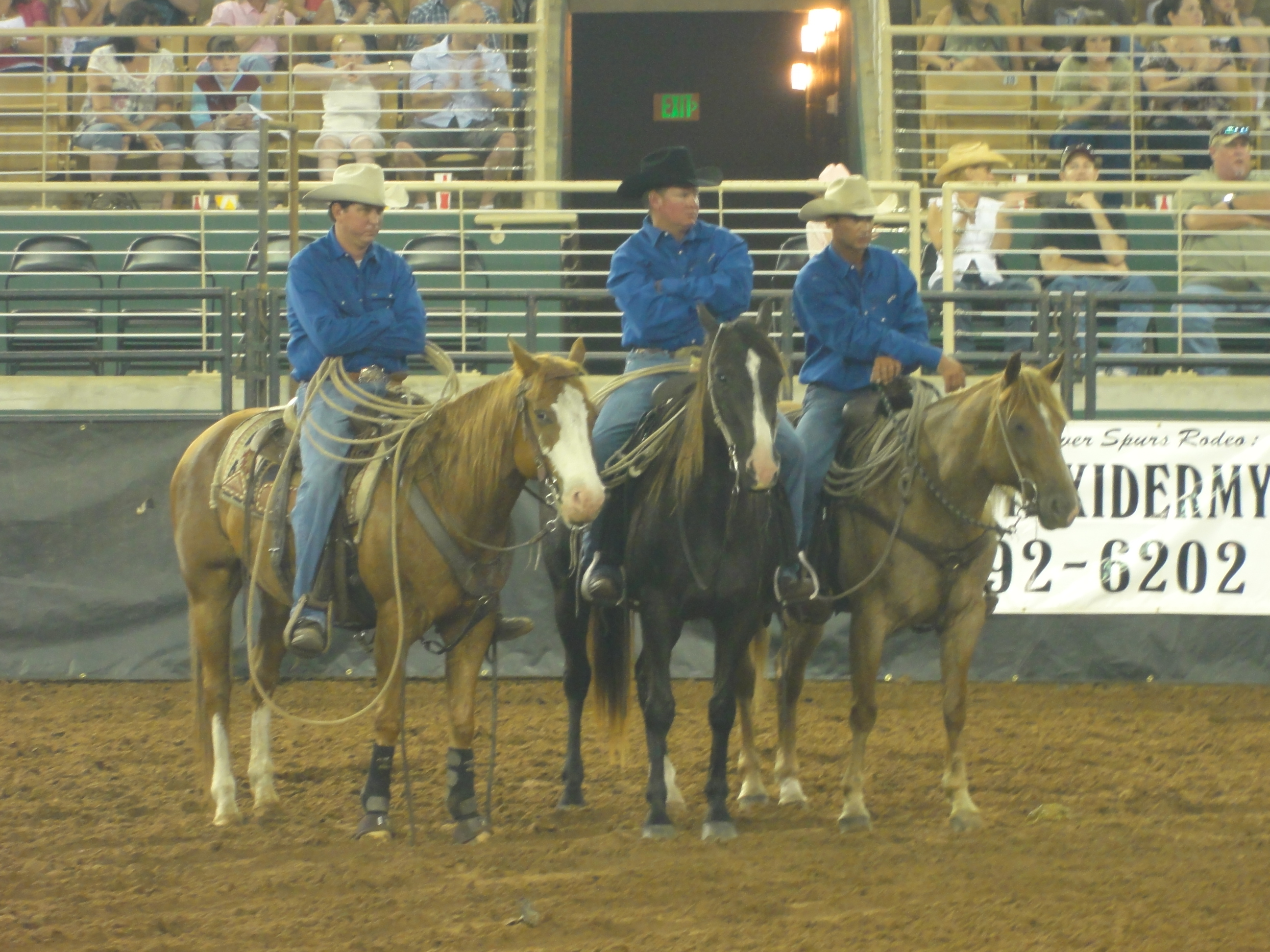
Central Florida cowboy culture, Silver Spurs Rodeo, Kissimmee

Lamme and Oldakowski's survey also found some cultural indicators that characterize Central Florida. In general, Central Florida was similar to North Florida and differed from South Florida in these measures. In Central and North Florida, American cuisine was the most popular food, in contrast to South Florida where ethnic foods were equally popular. Additionally, while there was little geographical variation for most styles of music, there was regional variation for both country and Latin music. Country was popular in Central and North Florida, and less so in South Florida, while Latin was less popular in Central and North Florida, and more so in South Florida.

== Demographics ==
In 2009, the estimated total population of the Central Florida, including the populations of Orange, Seminole, Osceola, Brevard, Volusia, and Lake counties region was 3.3 million people. If the populations of Polk and Sumter counties were included, the estimated population would be 3.969 million people. Exponential growth has fueled Central Florida for the past thirty years. The U.S. Census Bureau reported that the Orlando–Kissimmee–Sanford metropolitan area ranked among the fastest-growing metros in the country during 2022 and 2023. This expansion aligns with a broader statewide trend in Florida, which has seen consistent population surges fueled by domestic migration, favorable business conditions, and infrastructure development (U.S. Census Bureau, 2024). In 2024, Orlando’s 2.7% population growth surpassed Florida’s overall statewide growth rate of 2.0%. This indicates that Central Florida is expanding faster than nearly all other regions of the state, reinforcing its economic and cultural significance within Florida (ClickOrlando, 2025).

As of 2007 there were 70,000 Asians in Central Florida according to the U.S. Census. There were almost 1,900 Japanese persons, making up 3% of the Asians.

=== Recent growth (2024) ===
During July 1, 2023, and July 1, 2024, the Orlando metropolitan statistical area—representing the core of Central Florida—experienced a population increase of approximately 2.7%, adding nearly 75,969 residents. This growth made it the largest percentage increase among major U.S. metropolitan areas that year, highlighting the region’s strong migration and housing trends (Hamilton, 2025).

== Cities ==
Selected cities in Central Florida arranged by population:

City	Population		County
City	2020	2000	County
Tampa	384,959	303,447	Hillsborough
Orlando	307,573	185,951	Orange
St. Petersburg	258,308	248,232	Pinellas
Palm Bay	119,760	79,413	Brevard
Clearwater	117,292	108,789	Pinellas
Lakeland	112,641	78,452	Polk
Deltona	93,692	69,543	Volusia
Largo	82,485	69,371	Pinellas
Melbourne	84,678	71,382	Brevard
Kissimmee	79,226	47,814	Osceola
Daytona Beach	72,647	64,112	Volusia
Port Orange	62,596	45,823	Volusia
Sanford	61,051	38,291	Seminole
St. Cloud	58,964	35,183	Osceola
Apopka	54,873	26,642	Orange
Ormond Beach	43,080	36,301	Volusia
Clermont	43,021	9,333	Lake
Oviedo	40,059	26,316	Seminole

== Economy ==
Agriculture has occupied a large portion of Central Florida's economy, with winter strawberries, citrus, timber, vegetables, and aquaculture all making major contributions.

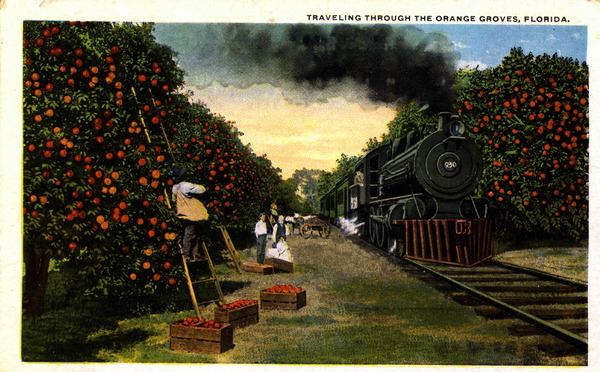
Orange groves, central Florida

Tourism is a large contributor to Central Florida's economy.

The area has economically diversified in the past decade. As a high-tech industrial hub, Metro Orlando has the seventh largest research park in the U.S., Central Florida Research Park, the engineering and business school of the University of Central Florida. It has defense companies such as Lockheed Martin and Siemens.

Medical research is prominent at Tampa's University of South Florida and Orlando's University of Central Florida, as well as the Sanford-Burnham Medical Research Institute biomedical research facility. USF in particular is a national leader in cancer and dementia research.

The Tampa Bay area has become a center of high-tech manufacturing and research, while both Orlando and the Tampa Bay area are centers for the financial industry, especially insurers and back-end operations for large banking companies.

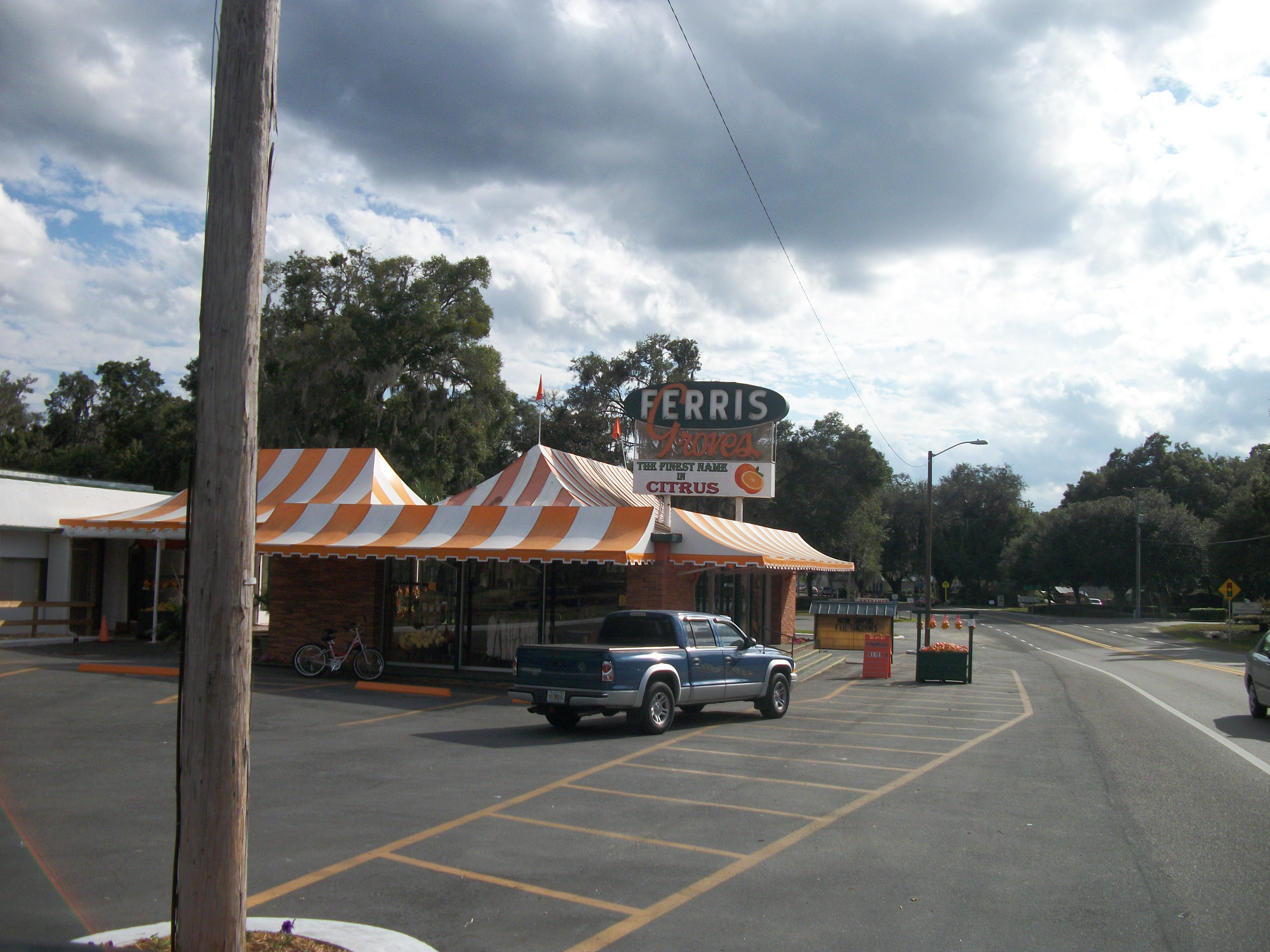
Ferris Groves Store in Floral City, one of many Old Florida style citrus stands found on the back roads of central Florida.

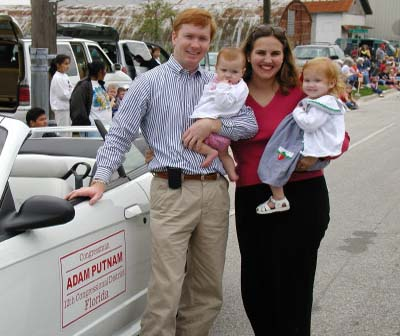
Plant City Strawberry Festival, Congressman Putnam with wife Melissa and their daughters at the Strawberry Parade in Plant City, Florida,

Active military installations in the region include Patrick Space Force Base and Cape Canaveral Space Force Station located on the Atlantic coast; MacDill Air Force Base, Coast Guard Air Station Clearwater and Coast Guard Sector St. Petersburg on the Gulf Coast; and Naval Support Activity Orlando, the Navy Pinecastle Impact (Bombing) Range, and the Avon Park Air Force Range located inland. These are augmented by major commands that are tenant activities at these installations, such as the headquarters for United States Central Command (USCENTCOM) and the headquarters for United States Special Operations Command (USSOCOM) at MacDill AFB, the Naval Ordnance Test Unit and Coast Guard Station Port Canaveral at Cape Canaveral SFS, and other Active, Reserve, Army National Guard, and Air National Guard activities that are located as either stand-alone facilities or as tenants on the active duty installations.

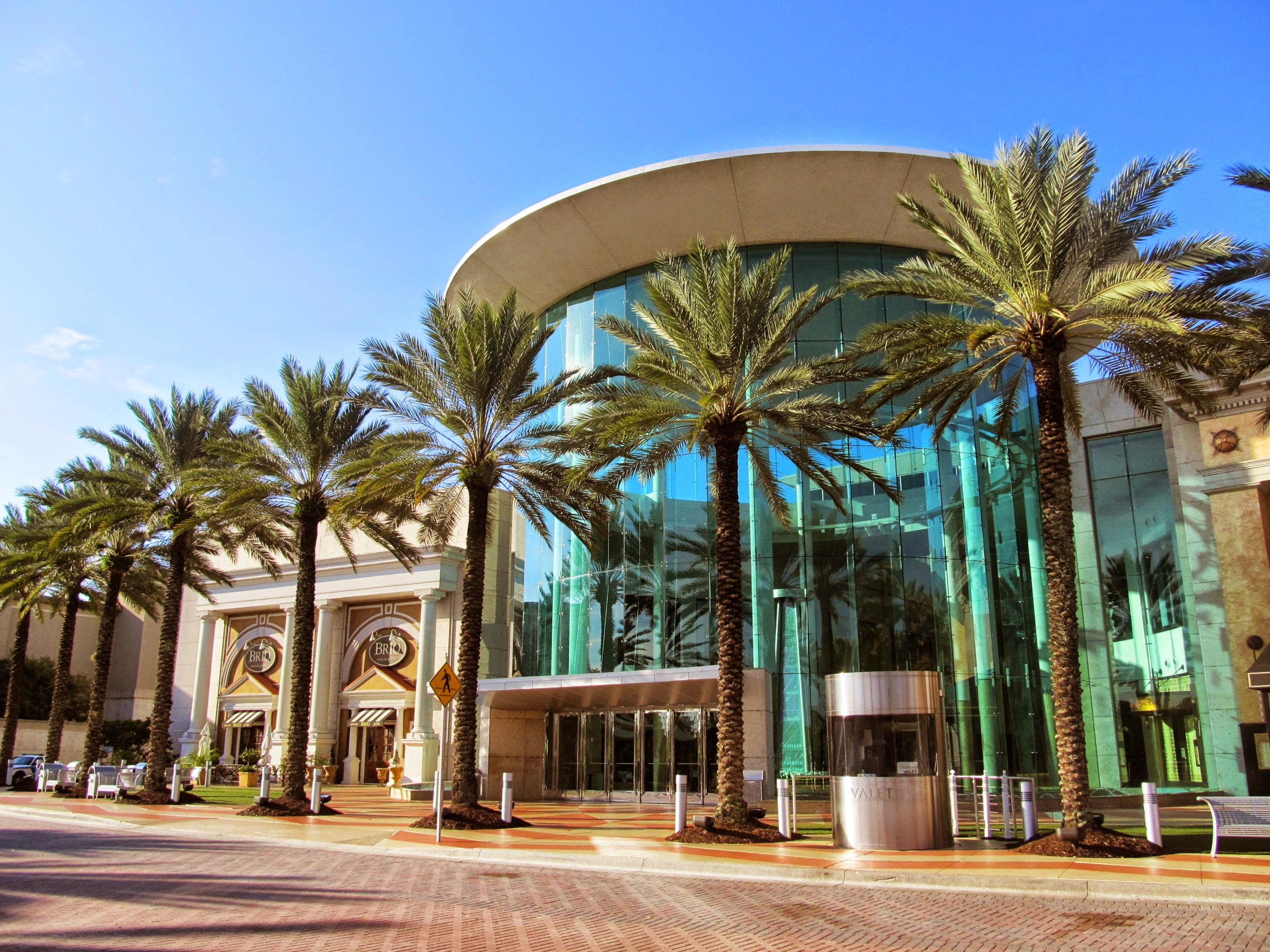
The Mall at Millenia, a super-regional high-end shopping mall in the Orlando metro area.

Additional former facilities that have since been closed and converted to civilian use include Hillsborough Army Air Field, a World War II training range which is now part of a neighborhood, Busch Gardens Tampa Bay, and the University of South Florida; Naval Air Station Sanford, which closed in 1968 and is the present day Orlando-Sanford International Airport; McCoy Air Force Base, which closed in 1975 and is the present day Orlando International Airport; and Orlando Air Force Base, which was transferred to the Navy in 1968 and renamed Naval Training Center Orlando until its BRAC-directed closure in 1999 and conversion to the present day Baldwin Park neighborhood.

The other major U.S. Government installations in Central Florida is the Kennedy Space Center, a NASA facility located adjacent to Cape Canaveral SFS, and the Department of Veterans Affairs (VA) Outpatient Clinic at Baldwin Park (former Orlando AFB Hospital / former Naval Hospital Orlando) and the VA Hospital at Lake Nona.

=== Largest employers ===
In July 2026, the largest employers were Walt Disney World with 80,000 workers, AdventHealth with 40,000 workers, Universal Orlando Resort with 32,000 workers, Orlando Health with 30,594 workers and Publix Supermarkets with 27,293 workers.

=== Triple Crown Growth ===
According to the Orlando Economic Partnership, Central Florida recently earned a “Triple Crown” distinction by simultaneously leading the United States in job growth, population growth, and gross domestic product (GDP) expansion. This distinction reflects the area’s thriving tourism, technology, and business service industries that attract new companies and residents (Orlando Economic Partnership, n.d.).

=== Attractions ===
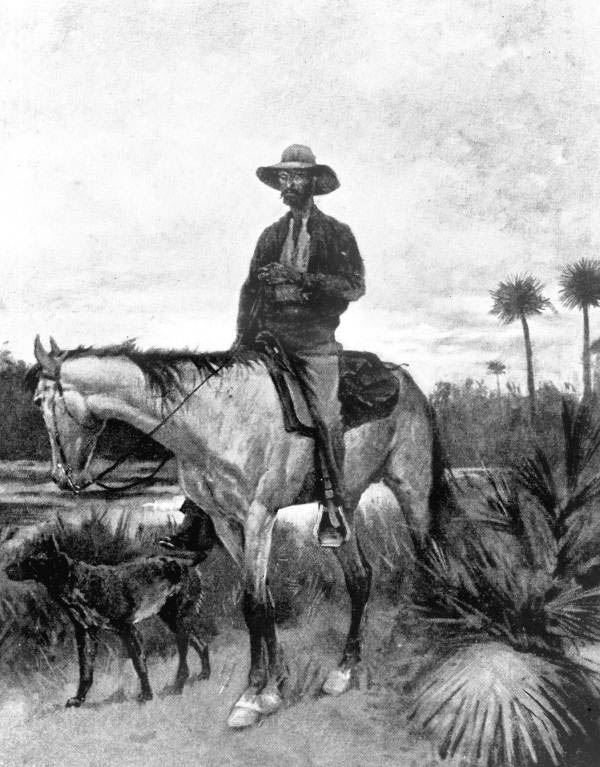
Cracker Country Living History Museum, located at The Florida State Fairgrounds, Tampa, founded by Mr. and Mrs. Doyle Carlton Jr. to ensure future generations might better understand and appreciate Florida's rural heritage

Daytona International Speedway on the day of the Daytona 500 in central Florida

==== Theme parks ====
- Walt Disney World Resort, which includes Magic Kingdom, Epcot, Disney's Hollywood Studios, Disney's Animal Kingdom, Disney's Typhoon Lagoon and Disney's Blizzard Beach
- SeaWorld Orlando
- Universal Orlando Resort, which includes Universal Studios Florida, Universal Islands of Adventure, Universal Epic Universe and Universal Volcano Bay
- Busch Gardens Tampa Bay and Adventure Island
- Legoland Florida
- Gatorland
- Fun Spot America Theme Parks

==== Zoos ====
Central Florida has four major zoos, the Central Florida Zoo and Botanical Gardens in Sanford, the Brevard Zoo in Melbourne, the Busch Gardens Tampa Bay animal park, and Lowry Park Zoo in Tampa. There are also two theme parks in Orlando featuring animals, albeit to a much lesser extent: Disney's Animal Kingdom and SeaWorld Orlando.

==== Natural areas ====
Central Florida also has a wide variety of natural attractions including the Bok Tower Gardens, Wekiwa Springs State Park, Blue Spring State Park, Rock Springs Run State Reserve, Canaveral National Seashore, and Merritt Island National Wildlife Refuge. The region also boasts an extensive network of recreational trails (jogging, biking, equestrian, etc.). While many connections are already in place, construction continues and will link all of the trails and greenways. Major trails include the Cady Way, Cross Seminole and West Orange Trails. Many of the top ranked beaches in the United States are located in Central Florida.

== Transportation ==
=== Airports ===
Major international airports include:

- Orlando International Airport
- Daytona Beach International Airport
- Orlando-Sanford International Airport
- Tampa International Airport
- St. Pete-Clearwater International Airport
- Melbourne International Airport
- Leesburg International Airport
- Lakeland Linder International Airport
- Winter Haven's Gilbert Airport
- Space Coast Regional Airport

=== Seaports ===
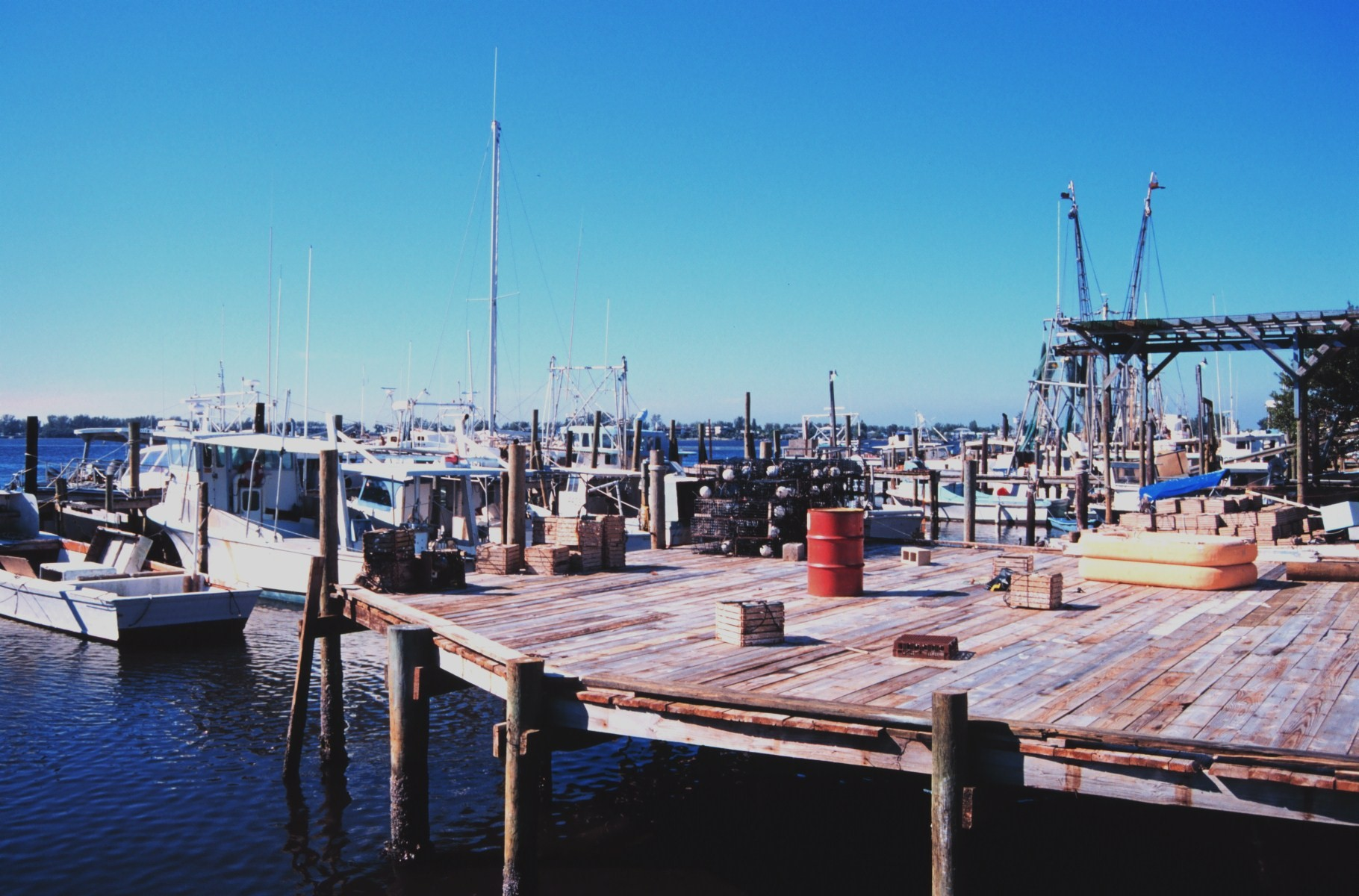
The central Florida seafood industry is shown here with a photograph of shrimp, snapper, grouper, and stone crab fishing boats at Cortez, Florida.

Port Canaveral, located in Cape Canaveral 45 minutes east of Orlando, is a cruise, cargo, and naval port. It is one of the busiest ports in Florida and is economically tied to Orlando. Locally perceived to be Orlando's seaport, Port Canaveral is the closest port for tourists and Orlando residents alike to cruise on Disney Cruise Line and Carnival Cruises. Future plans for the port include a rail and natural gas line running directly to Orlando International Airport.

Another major seaport of the region is Port Tampa Bay, which is one of the busiest in the state and is on the verge of a huge expansion which will allow it to compete on an international level.

=== Freeways and highways ===
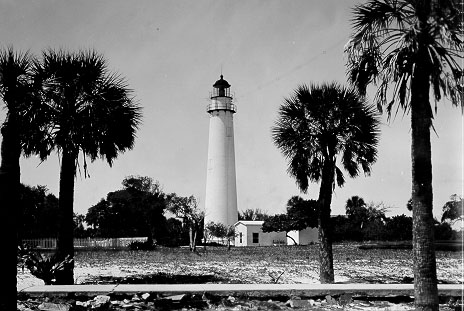
Historic Egmont Key Light is located in Tampa Bay, built in 1848 and commissioned by Col. Robert E. Lee. The island is on the National Register of Historic Places, and is a National Wildlife Refuge and a state park. Early in the Civil War, Confederate blockade-runners used the island as a base.

Limited Access Freeways and Expressways:

- Interstate 4 (Florida State Road 400)
- Interstate 75 (SR 93 and 93A)
- Interstate 275 (SR 93)
- Interstate 175 (SR 594)
- Interstate 375
- Interstate 95 (SR 9)
- Florida's Turnpike (SR 91)
- Florida State Road 100 – Moody Boulevard
- Florida State Road 528 – Beachline Expressway
- Florida State Road 408 – Holland East/West Expressway
- Florida State Road 417 – Central Florida GreeneWay
- Florida State Road 429 – Western Expressway
- Florida State Road 414 – Apopka Bypass
- Florida State Road 570 – Polk Parkway
- Florida State Road 589 – Veteran's Expressway
- Florida State Road 618 – Selmon Expressway

Major Surface Arterials:

- U.S. Highway 441
- U.S. Highway 17-92
- U.S. Highway 27
- U.S. Highway 192
- U.S. Highway 1
- U.S. Highway 98
- Florida State Road 19
- Florida State Road 33
- Florida State Road 46
- Florida State Road 415
- Florida State Road 436
- Florida State Road 50
- Florida State Road 60
- Florida State Road 520

* U.S. Highway 41

=== Public transportation ===
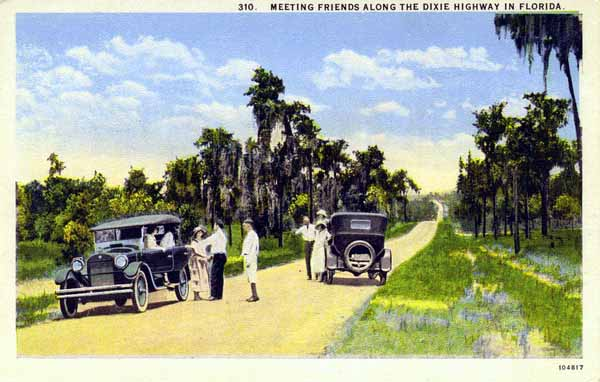
The Dixie Highway is a historic route passing through the heart of central Florida. Before the interstate system, it connected motorists traveling to towns such as Orlando, Arcadia and Bartow.

A regional commuter rail network is being developed in Central Florida. The first of these initiatives, SunRail, is a commuter rail line that runs from DeLand south to Kissimmee. The first phase was completed in 2014 with the full system in place in 2015. Amtrak also serves Central Florida running on CSX Transportation's A line and stops at the Orlando Amtrak station. The Auto Train stops in Sanford, Florida, north of downtown Orlando.

As of 2022, a high speed rail between Orlando and Miami is currently being developed by Brightline, who plans to extend the rail to Tampa after completion.

== Education ==
Florida's public primary and secondary schools are administered by the Florida Department of Education.

Eckerd College
St. Petersburg

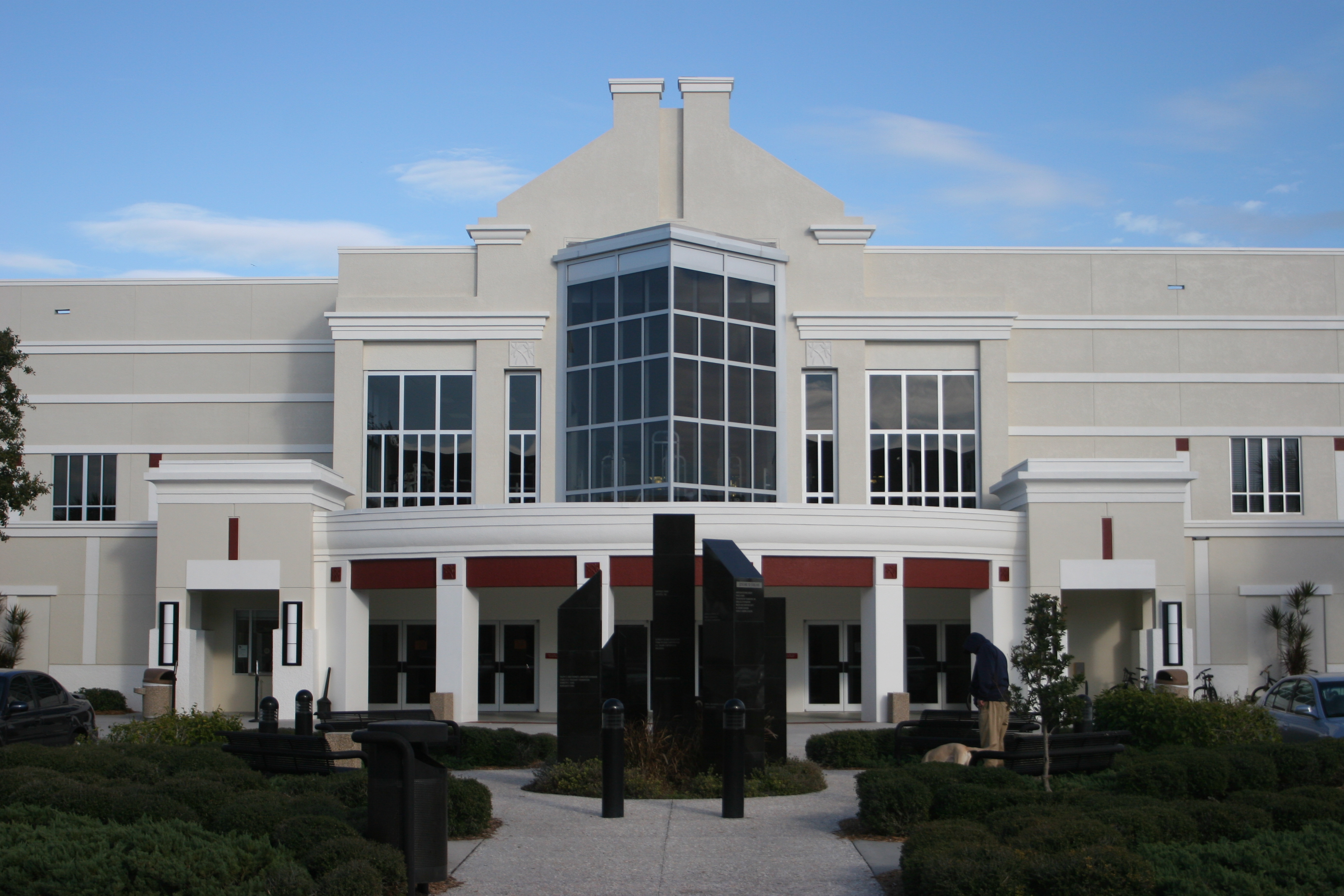
Florida Institute of Technology
Melbourne

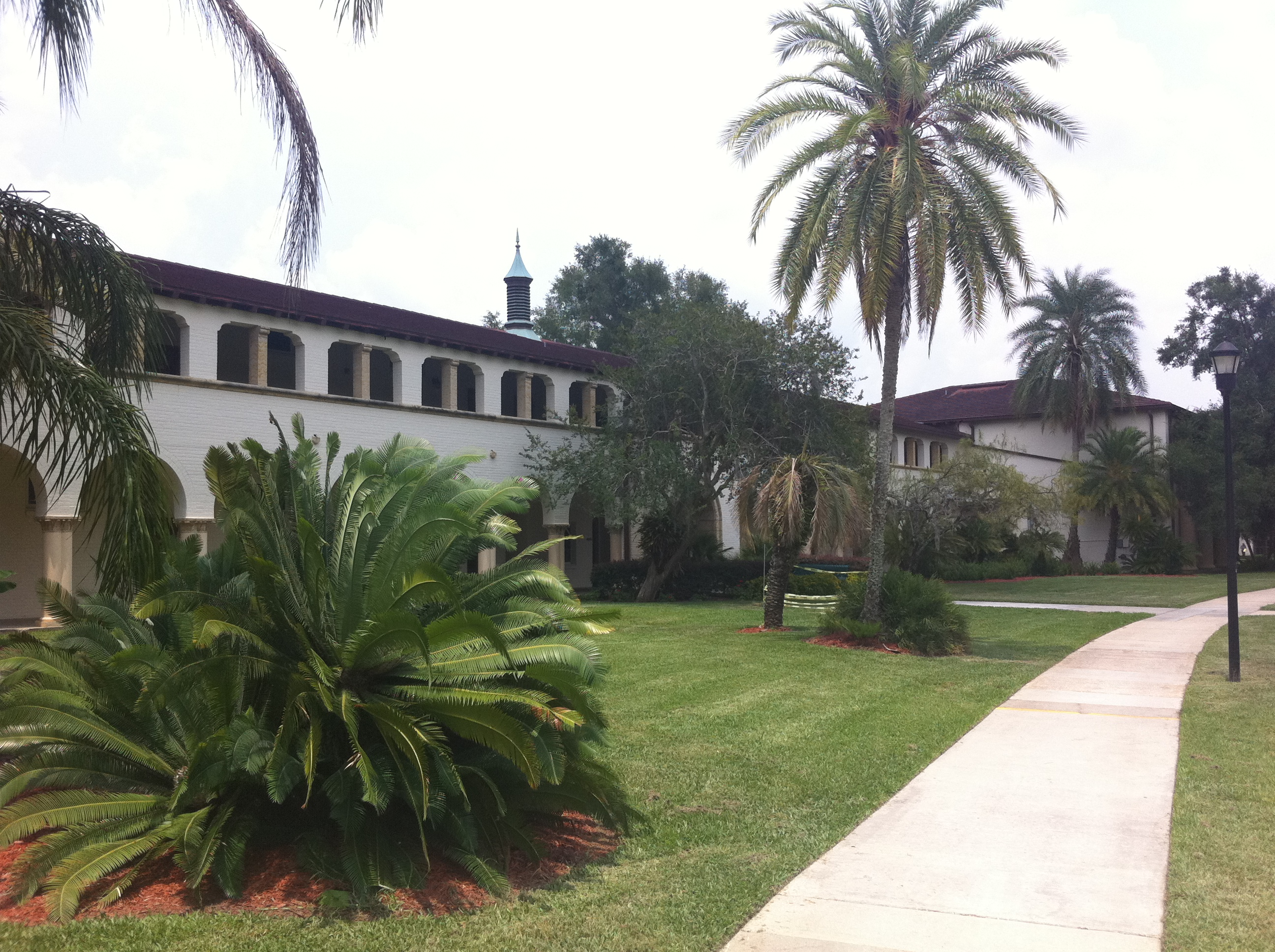
Saint Leo University
St. Leo

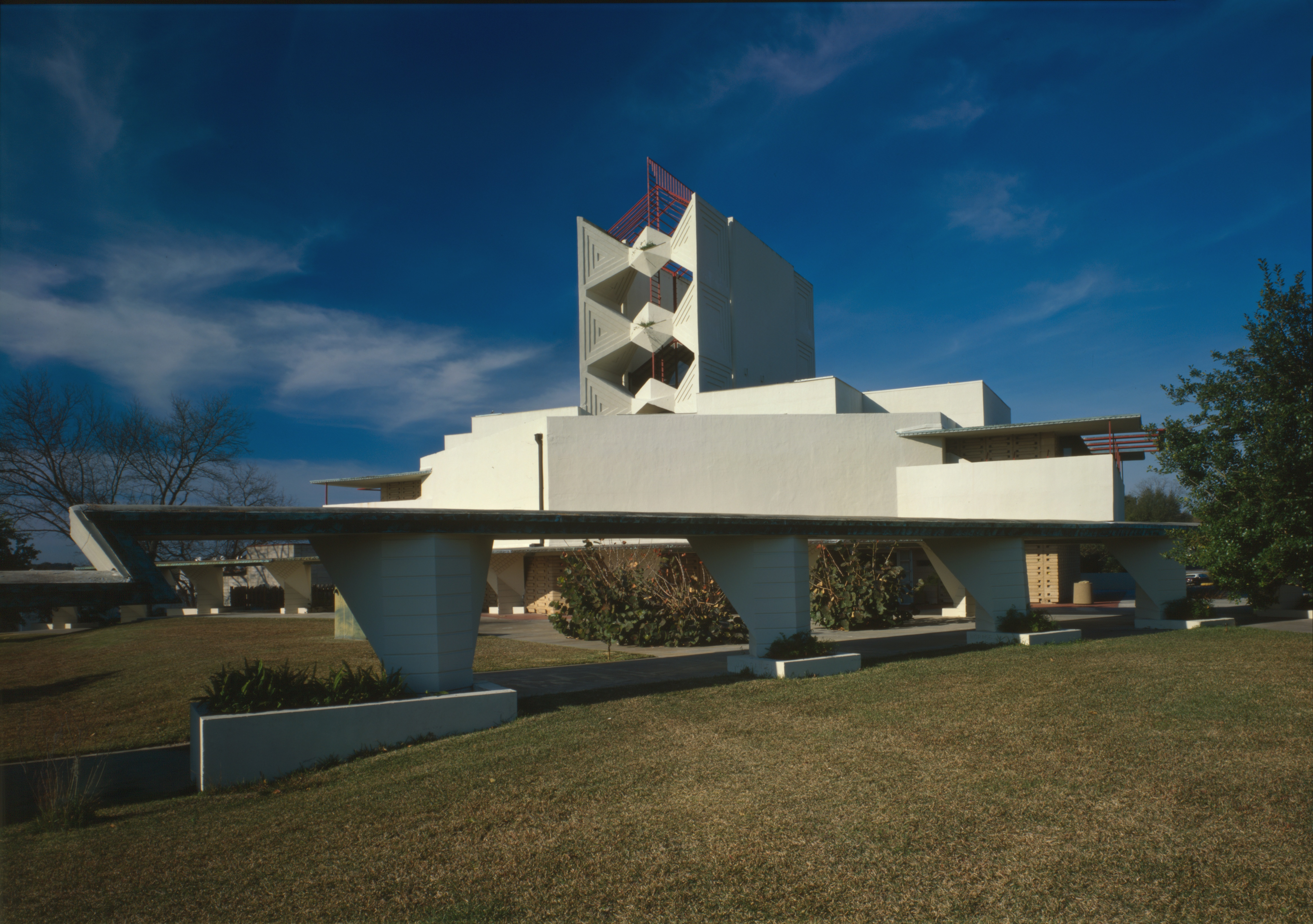
Florida Southern College
Lakeland

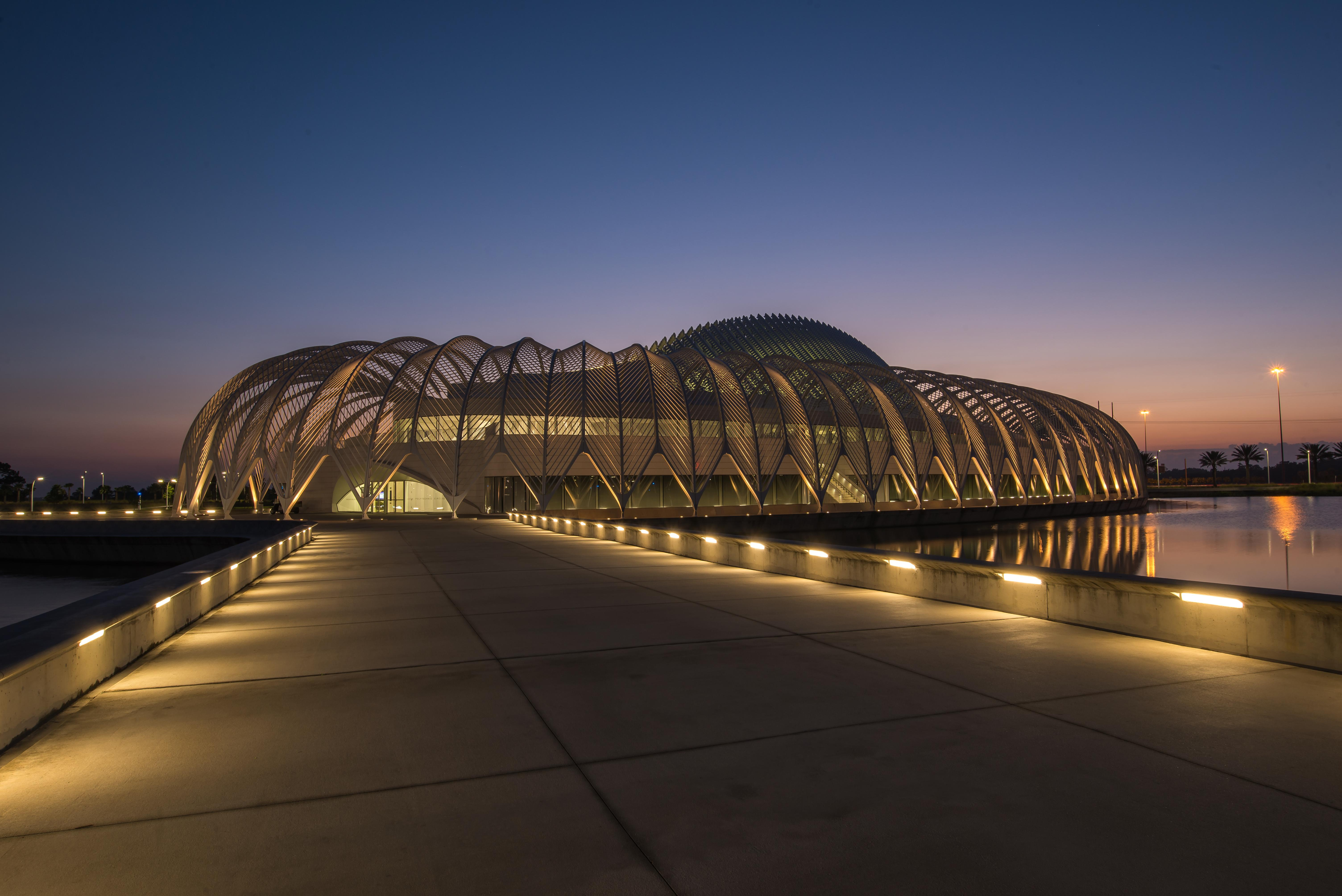
Florida Polytechnic University Lakeland

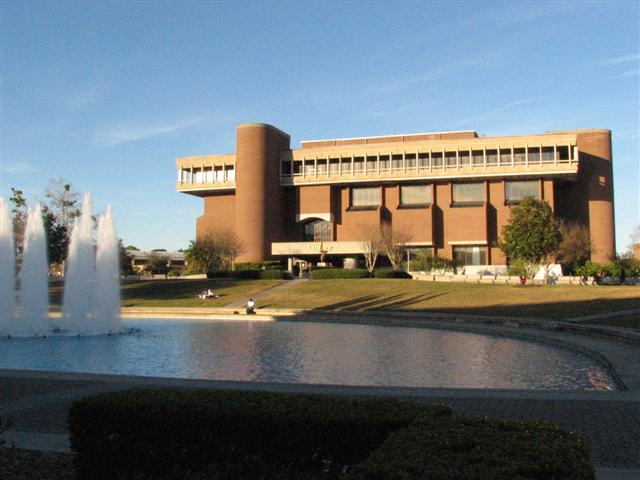
University of Central Florida
Orlando

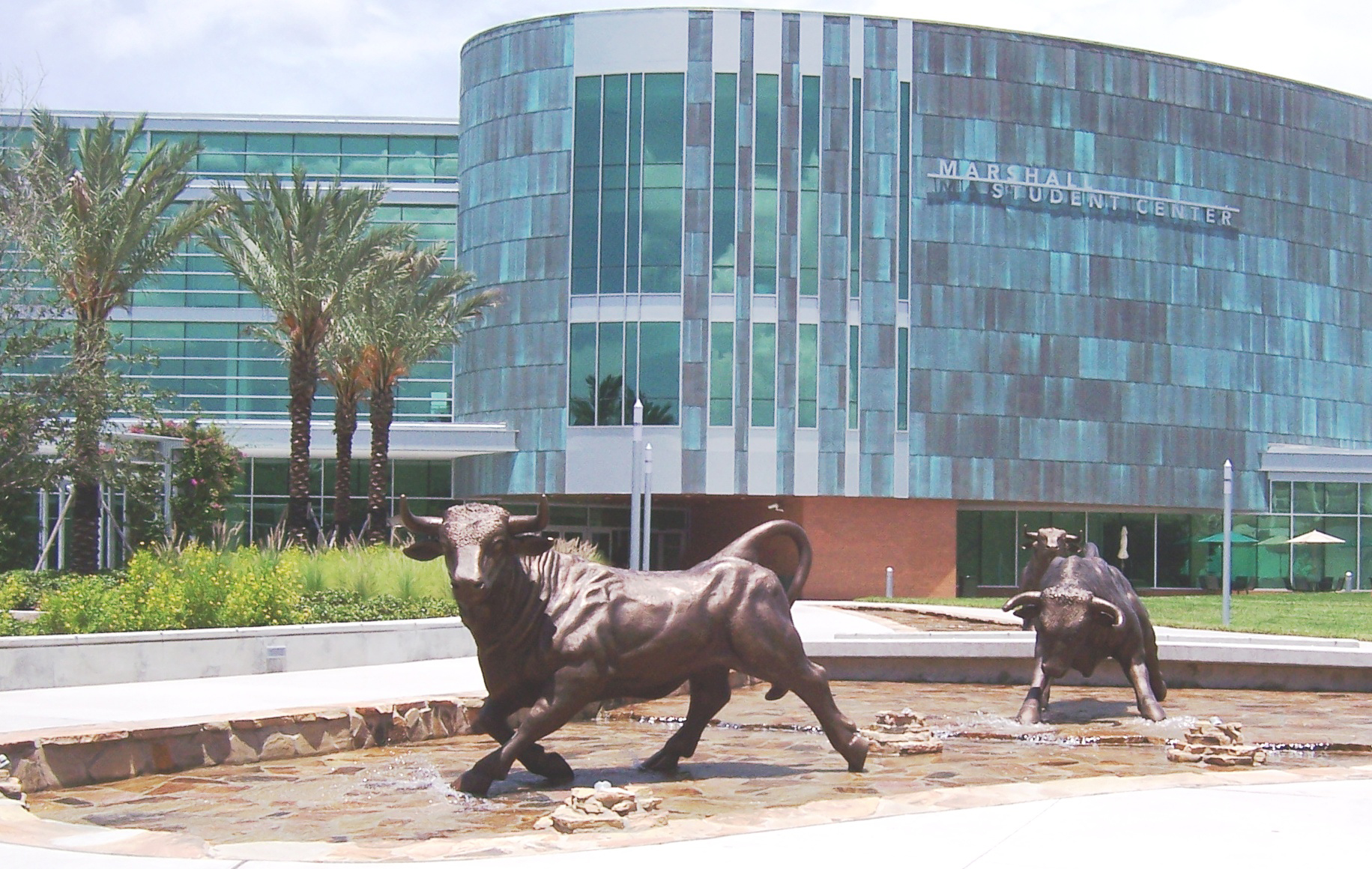
University of South Florida

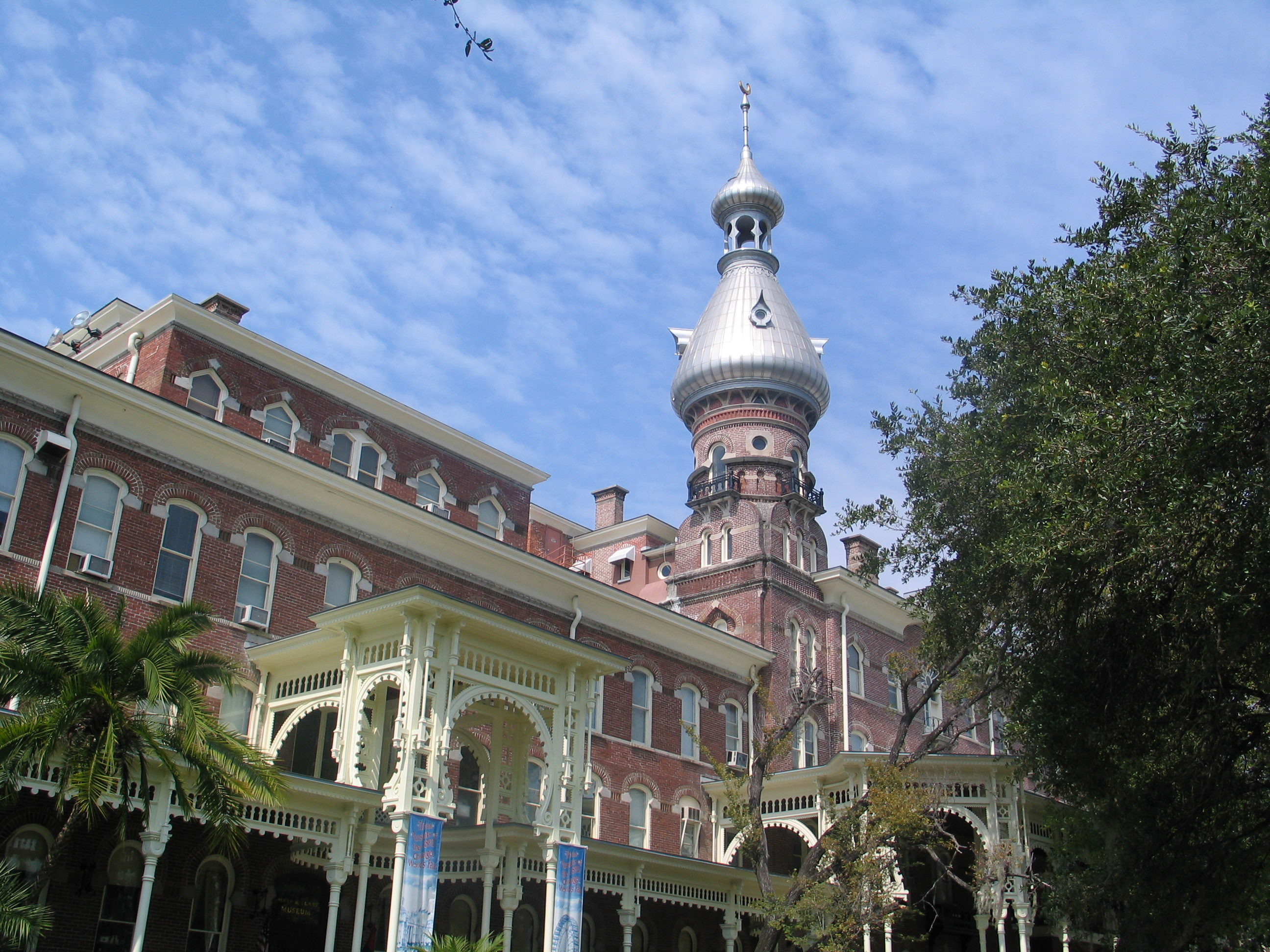
University of Tampa
Tampa

== Research and Innovation ==
Central Florida is also recognized as a hub for innovation, anchored by the Central Florida Research Park located near the University of Central Florida. The park is the largest research complex in the state, hosting more than 120 defense, simulation, and high-tech companies that contribute to national research, modeling, and training initiatives (Central Florida Research Park, n.d.).
