= National Center for Simulation =

- Type: Nonprofit
- Industry: Research and development Engineering; Science; Economics; Public policy Defense
- Founded: 1993
- Headquarters: Orlando, Florida, US
- Key people: Mr. George Cheros President & CEO, Dr. Neal Finkelstein Chief Operating Officer, & Lindsey Spalding, Director of Education and Workforce, Abbie Easter, Business Operations Manager, Lana Wallis, Deputy Director of STARBASE, and Chris Voltzke, Lead STARBASE Instructor
- Website: www.simulationinformation.com

The National Center for Simulation (NCS) is an association of defense companies, government, academic, start-up companies, and industry members. NCS is located in the Central Florida Research Park, adjacent to Naval Support Activity Orlando, and the simulation headquarters of the Army, Navy, Marine Corps, Air Force, and the University of Central Florida in Orlando, Florida, US.

== History ==
NCS was created in 1993 to support collaboration among the defense industry, NASA, government, and academia.

NCS is headquartered in the Central Florida Research Park in Orlando, Florida, which is home to the world's largest cluster for computer simulation and modeling, and more than 370 companies that are members of NCS. The ecosystem includes approximately $7 billion in procurement dollars for modeling, simulation, and training companies, supported by the military simulation and training commands for the U.S. Army, the U.S. Navy, the U.S. Air Force, and the U.S. Marine Corps. U.S. Coast Guard interests are handled by a liaison officer and staff embedded in the Navy's training systems organization.

Mr. George E. Cheros became President and CEO in July 2019. Dr. Neal Finkelstein became Chief Operating Officer in October 2019,

== Team Orlando ==
NCS is part of the "Team Orlando" partnership between military organizations, the modeling and simulation industry, and academic institutions working together to leverage resources and contribute to the overall security of the United States. Besides NCS, charter members of Team Orlando include the U.S. Army's Program Executive Office for Simulation, Training and Instrumentation (PEO-STRI), the U.S. Navy's Naval Air Warfare Center Training Systems Division (NAWCTSD), the U.S. Air Force Agency for Modeling and Simulation (AFAMS), the U.S. Marine Corps Program Manager for Training Systems (PMTRASYS), the Joint Program Office for Medical Simulation, the United States Army Simulation and Training Technology Center (STTC), the U.S. Coast Guard Liaison Office at NAWCTSD, and the University of Central Florida's School of Modeling, Simulation and Training.
