= Institute for Simulation and Training =

Research institute at University of Central Florida

Coordinates: 28°35′24″N 81°11′59″W

- Type: Research Institute
- Established: 1982; 44 years ago
- Director: Carolina Cruz-Neira, Ph.D.
- Location: Orlando, Florida, United States
- Website: Official Site

The Institute for Simulation and Training (IST) is a research institute of the University of Central Florida located in Orlando, Florida, United States. Carolina Cruz-Neira was appointed director of IST in spring 2025.

The Institute provides a wide range of research and information services for the modeling, simulation and training community of Central Florida. As well, the institute aids in undergraduate and graduate studies in modeling and simulation leading to bachelor's degrees, master's degrees, Professional Science Master's and doctoral degrees. IST is a member of the National Center for Simulation.

== See also ==
- University of Central Florida
