= Serious Games Showcase and Challenge =

Video game developer competition

The Serious Games Showcase and Challenge is a competition and a showcase event that was created to encourage video game developers to create products that are useful for non-entertainment purposes. The annual event made its first appearance as an exhibit space at the Interservice/Industry Training, Simulation, and Education Conference (I/ITSEC) in 2006. The event accepts games from universities, businesses, and government organizations as entries in competition for awards prizes.

Each year the event awards a Best Academic, Small Business, Large Business, and Government Game. Attendees at the conference can also vote on the People's Choice Award.

== Description ==
For the purpose of the Challenge, entries will be considered a game if they involve an assigned challenge and employ some form of positive and/or negative reward system.

Entries will be considered a serious game if they use these gaming attributes to overcome a designated problem or deficiency, and provide appropriate feedback to the user about their efforts. Entered games must target users at the high school level, at a minimum.

Finalists will be selected by a panel of leaders in the gaming, industry and academic fields, and will be invited to showcase their serious game at I/ITSEC, where attendees will view and vote on each of the finalists. Awards will be presented to the top finishers in each category.

The Challenge is open to a wide range of contestants. Potential categories include student, individual (indie game developer) / government and business. PC game entries (or compiled for PC execution) will be accepted from virtually any application areas including "mods", mobile, virtual worlds and original development. Gaming content can be focused on any genre such as business, education or government.

All entries will be judged by representatives in leading gaming, academic and industry companies in three primary areas, solution to a stated problem, technical quality and playability. Entries should clearly define the problem or need that is being addressed, as well as the gaming or game technology solution involved. Each entry must be not only technologically sound in its development, delivery and user interface, but also engaging, enjoyable, and easy to use, providing a challenging and rewarding experience to the user.

Innovative approaches to any of the entered solutions are specifically encouraged and rewarded in the scoring.

== Awards ==
- Best Student Game In order to be eligible for an award, a student team must be composed of students who are actively enrolled in a post-secondary institution such as a college, trade school, or university. The winning team receives recognition at SGS&C; the winning individual or team receives a plaque.
- Best Individual or Small Business Game Individuals or small businesses are eligible for this category. In order to be eligible for an award, a small business team must be composed of members who are currently employed by businesses that have 500 or fewer employees at the time of the game submission. The winning individual or team receives a plaque.
- Best Government Lab Game This category is aimed at government labs internally developing serious games. A government agency sponsoring a game through a contractor would be submitted by the contractor that as a business entry.
- Best Large Business Game In order to be eligible for an award, a large business team must be composed of members who are currently employed by businesses that have 500 or more employees at the time of game submission. The winning team receives a plaque.

== Winners ==
About the Showcase with links to past winners:
