= Central Florida Research Park =

Research park in Orlando, Florida, United States

Coordinates: 28.5800°N 81.1988°W

- Location: Orlando, Florida, United States
- Operator: University of Central Florida
- Established: 1978; 48 years ago
- Area: 1,027-acre (4.16 km^{2})
- Partners: 126
- Structures: 59
- Employees: 10,000
- Website: www.cfrp.org/

The Central Florida Research Park (CFRP) is a research park abutting the main campus of the University of Central Florida (UCF) in Orlando, Florida, United States. CFRP is the largest research park in Florida, the fourth largest in the United States by number of companies, and the seventh largest in the United States by number of employees. CFRP is home to numerous centers hosted by the United States Department of Defense, UCF, and private corporations.

== Park ==
The Park was established as a result of legislation passed by the Florida Legislature in 1978, and is a cooperative effort between the University of Central Florida, the Orange County Research and Development Authority, and the Orange County Board of County Commissioners. The governing body of the Park is the Orange County Research and Development Authority. The university and officials of CFRP believe that the potential for the establishment of close ties between the university and industry will create an attractive environment conducive to the location of research-oriented industry in the Park. This activity will enrich and support the academic, teaching, and research programs of the university. Businesses can purchase or lease land in the park on which to construct a facility or can lease space for office, lab, or light manufacturing activities.

Planned to provide a campus-like environment for business and military modeling, simulation, and training (MS&T) commands and activities adjacent to UCF, the CFRP covers over 1,027-acre (4.16 km^{2}), directly south of UCF's 1,415-acre (5.73 km^{2}) main campus in Orlando. Located approximately 13 miles (21 km) northeast of downtown Orlando and 55 miles (89 km) southwest of Daytona Beach, the park was built to supplement the university's goal of providing highly trained personnel to support the Kennedy Space Center and NASA, which is located only 35 miles (56 km) to the east.

== Partnerships ==
Significant organizations, including the Institute for Simulation and Training, National Center for Simulation, Team Orlando, and the National Center for Forensic Science, are located in the Research Park.

Given the importance of simulation and training to the Department of Defense, an extensive military presence is also located in the park centered on the Orlando area's last remaining active duty military installation, Naval Support Activity Orlando. Tenant commands at NSA Orlando include the Naval Air Warfare Center Training Systems Division (NAWCTSD), the U.S. Army Program Executive Office for Simulation, Training, and Instrumentation (PEO STRI), activities of the U.S. Army's Research, Development and Engineering Command United States Army Simulation and Training Technology Center (STTC), the Marine Corps Program Manager for Training Systems (PM TRASYS), and the Air Force Agency for Modeling and Simulation (AFAMS). Over $1.4 billion in federal contracts is awarded by the U.S. military each year for activities in and in the vicinity of the park.

== Notable tenants ==
- Aon Hewitt
- AT&T Inc.
- BAE Systems Land & Armaments
- Bank of America
- Boeing
- Booz Allen Hamilton
- CAE
- Carley Corporation
- Cisco Systems
- Collins Aerospace
- Cubic
- Florida Space Institute
- Florida Technical College
- General Dynamics
- Hewlett-Packard
- Huntington Ingalls Industries Mission Technologies
- L3Harris
- Leidos
- Martin Collier Phillips Corporation
- National Center for Simulation
- Northrop Grumman
- Raytheon
- SAIC
- Siemens
- United States Army Corps of Engineers
- United States Geological Survey
- Wyle Labs

NOTE:

- Lockheed Martin maintains a large facility dedicated to simulation and training approximately 3.5 miles southwest of the Central Florida Research Park.
- Camber Corporation maintained facilities in the Central Florida Research Park until relocating to The Quadrangle business park, approximately 1.5 miles to the northwest. It later relocated back to the south side of the park. In December 2016, Camber Corporation was acquired by Huntington Ingalls Industries (HII), which continues to maintain this facility as part of their Mission Technologies division. In 2022, HII acquired Alion Science and Technology Corporation and also took control of their Orlando facility.

== See also ==
- Innovation Way
- University of Central Florida research centers
