= Air Force Agency for Modeling and Simulation =

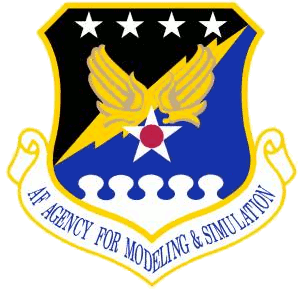
- Agency emblem
- Active: 3 June 1996 – present
- Country: United States
- Branch: United States Air Force
- Type: Field operating agency
- Role: Training modeling and simulation
- Part of: Headquarters Air Force
- Location: Central Florida Research Park, Orlando, Florida

The United States Air Force established the Air Force Agency for Modeling and Simulation (AFAMS) in June 1996 at Orlando, Florida. AFAMS mission is to enhance and leverage Modeling & Simulation to support and facilitate integrated, realistic and efficient operational training across warfighting domains to enable full-spectrum readiness. AFAMS vision is advance readiness through Live, Virtual and Constructive (LVC) training.

== Role ==
AFAMS manages the enterprise level programs in Live/Virtual/Constructive (LVC), Operational Training Infrastructure (OTI), and associated environments. AFAMS directly supports the USAF & DoD training mission in five functional areas: mission rehearsal, exercises & operational training, warfighter modeling and simulation (M&S) technology improvements, database and model management, enterprise requirements and standards. Air Force Mission Directive 56 established AFAMS with the following mandates:

- Implementation of Air Force, Joint, and DoD M&S policy and standards.
- Support for corporate Air Force M&S planning, requirements, and investment.
- Establishment, transition, and integration of major Air Force M&S initiatives and programs.
- Support for Air Force decision making and mission execution.

AFAMS is a field operating agency operating under the Training and Readiness directorate (AF/A3T) within the Headquarters Air Force organization at the Pentagon. AFAMS is located in the Central Florida Research Park, adjacent to the Naval Air Warfare Center Training Systems Division and Naval Support Activity Orlando, along with numerous other DoD, joint, service, contractor, and educational organizations focused on modeling, simulation and training (MS&T). Proximity to these other agencies is intended to provide the Air Force "the maximum leverage and advantage of the developing programs and technologies enhancing the Air Force ability to provide ready forces."

== See also ==
- List of United States Air Force Field Operating Agencies
