= Naval Air Warfare Center Training Systems Division =

Coordinates: 28°34′59″N 81°11′50″W

- Active: April 1941 – present
- Country: United States
- Branch: Navy
- Type: Research and development
- Garrison/HQ: Orlando, Florida, U.S.

Commanders
- Commanding Officer: Captain Robert Betts

The Naval Air Warfare Center Training Systems Division (NAWCTSD) is an Echelon IV command of the United States Navy, reporting to the Commander, Naval Air Warfare Center - Aircraft Division (NAWCAD) at NAS Patuxent River, Maryland. NAWCTSD is located in Orlando, Florida, in the Central Florida Research Park, adjacent to the University of Central Florida (UCF). The facility is a part of a larger military installation within the Central Florida Research Park known as Naval Support Activity Orlando (NSA Orlando).

The Commanding Officer (CO) of NAWCTSD, an aeronautically designated U.S. Navy Captain, is also dual-hatted as the installation CO of NSA Orlando. This results in a dual-track command chain, answering to the Commander of NAWCAD as CO of NAWCTSD for Naval Air Systems Command (NAVAIR) issues, and to the Commander, Navy Installations Command (CNIC) as CO of NSA Orlando for installation-related issues.

NAWCTSD is the principal U.S. Navy center for research, development, test and evaluation, acquisition, life cycle program management and product support of all aviation, surface and undersea training systems, devices and programs for the U.S. Navy and all aviation training systems for the U.S. Marine Corps. It also provides interservice coordination and training systems support for the U.S. Army, U.S. Air Force and U.S. Coast Guard, especially in those instances of similar platforms and systems (i.e., USAF CV-22B Osprey, USCG MH-60T Jayhawk, etc.).

== History ==
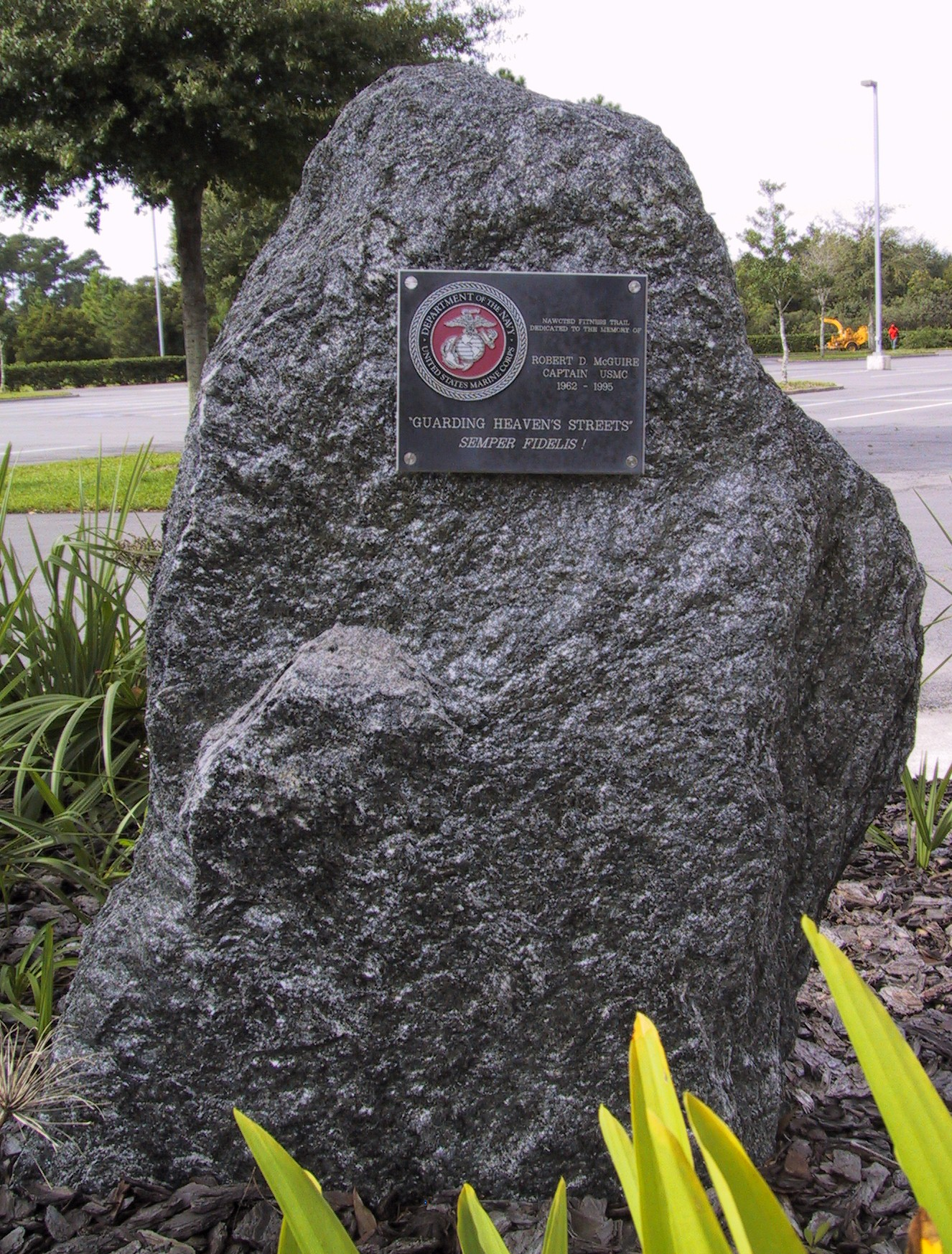
Robert D. McGuire memorial. Inscription on plaque reads: NAWCTSD FITNESS TRAIL DEDICATED TO THE MEMORY OF ROBERT D. McGUIRE CAPTAIN USMC 1962 - 1995 "GUARDING HEAVEN'S STREETS" SEMPER FIDELIS!

The roots of the NAWCTSD reach back to April 1941 when then-commander Luis de Florez became head of the new Special Devices Desk in the Engineering Division of the Navy's Bureau of Aeronautics (BuAer). De Florez championed the use of "synthetic training devices" and urged the Navy to undertake development of such devices to increase readiness. In June, the desk became the Special Devices Section.

Throughout World War II, the Section developed numerous innovative training devices including ones that used motion pictures to train aircraft gunners, a device to train precision bombing, and a kit with which to build model terrains to facilitate operational planning in the field.

The Special Devices Section grew and became the Special Devices Division. In August 1946, the Division, at its newest home at Port Washington, New York, was commissioned the Special Devices Center.

As what would later become NAWCTSD evolved and grew, it was aligned at various times under several different parent organizations within the Navy. In 1956, it became the Naval Training Device Center (NAVTRADEVCEN). Over a three-year period in the mid-1960s, the Center moved from its Long Island location to Orlando, Florida, taking residence as a tenant activity at the then-Orlando Air Force Base, that installation subsequently becoming Naval Training Center Orlando in 1968 until its closure in 1999 pursuant to a 1993 Base Realignment and Closure Commission (BRAC) decision.

In 1985, the by then renamed Naval Training Equipment Center (NTEC) became the Naval Training Systems Center (NTSC). In 1988, the Center moved from NTC Orlando to its present headquarters approximately 15 miles east of its former location and just south of the University of Central Florida campus. The main building complex named for its founding father, de Florez.

On October 1, 1993, the Naval Training Systems Center became today's NAWCTSD. In 2003, the command was briefly renamed Naval Air Systems Command Training Systems Division (NAVAIR-TSD), but has since reverted to its original name. In 2005, the physical facility and property was also designated as an independent base named Naval Support Activity Orlando, making it the sole remaining active duty U.S. Navy installation in the Orlando area. At approximately 40 acres in size, NSA Orlando is the second smallest shore installation in the U.S. Navy. However, it is surrounded by several "Partnership" buildings owned and maintained by the State of Florida and effectively leased at cost to various modeling, simulation and training (MS&T) commands of the Department of Defense, to include Army and Marine Corps commands, effectively increasing the military community to several hundred acres. The Air Force MS&T command in Orlando, the Air Force Agency for Modeling and Simulation (AFAMS), currently leases commercial office property immediately adjacent to, but outside the fence line of, NSA Orlando.

NAWCTSD remains a component of the Naval Air Systems Command, but continues to maintain a portfolio and lines of effort that extends beyond Naval Aviation, to include other activities of the Navy and is a collaborative partner with other DoD and non-DoD organizations.

== Naval Support Activity Orlando ==
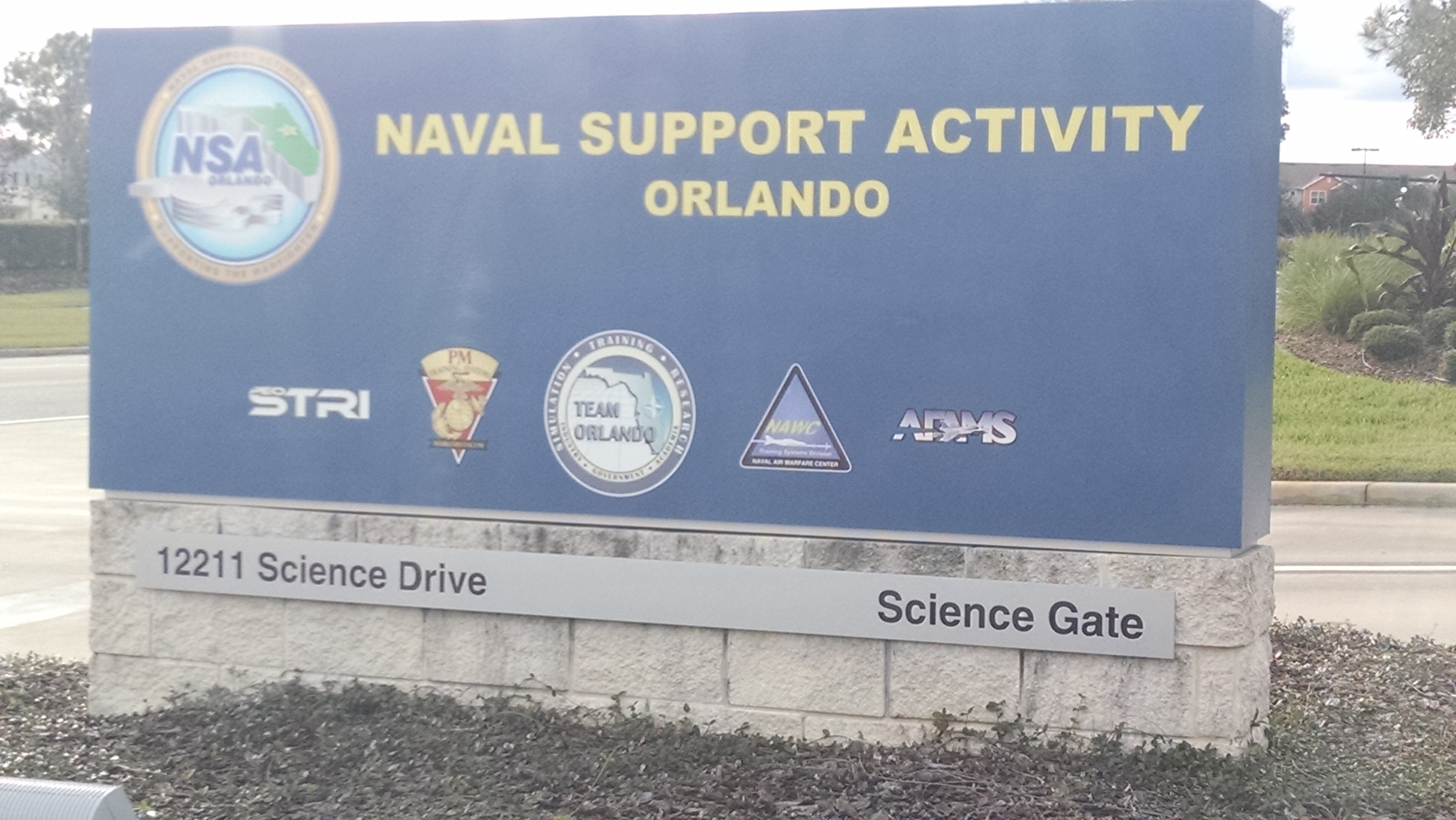
Sign outside Naval Support Activity Orlando

The land and main buildings on which the main NAWCTSD facility is located inside the Central Florida Research Park is a U.S. government installation that was designated as Naval Support Activity Orlando in 2005. Additional nearby buildings and facilities are shared in partnership with the Central Florida Research Park and the University of Central Florida and house other Department of Defense (DoD) and Department of Homeland Security (DHS) activities, to include the U.S. Army Futures Command's Synthetic Training Environment Cross-Functional Team (STE CFT), the U.S. Army Program Executive Office for Simulation, Training and Instrumentation (PEO-STRI), the U.S. Marine Corps Program Manager for Training Systems (PMTRASYS), the Air Force Agency for Modeling and Simulation (AFAMS), United States Army Simulation and Training Technology Center (STTC), Federal Law Enforcement Training Centers FLETC Orlando team and the Veterans Health Administration Simulation Learning, Education and Research Network.

As previously stated, the Commanding Officer of NAWCTSD is concurrently dual-hatted as the Commanding Officer of NSA Orlando. Command of the combined NAWCTSD and NSA Orlando is held by a Naval Aviator or Naval Flight Officer in the rank of Captain, either an unrestricted line officer dual-designated as an acquisition professional (AP), or a restricted line aeronautical engineering duty officer.

The gate guardian aircraft for the installation is a Douglas A-4 Skyhawk, BuNo 139931, in Blue Angels livery. This aircraft was previously a gate guardian at the former NTC Orlando and was relocated to NSA Orlando in 1999, just prior to the former's closure due to BRAC. Another aircraft, an F/A-18A Hornet, BuNo 161597, is located on the west side of the installation and is painted in low visibility gray Fleet markings with NAVAIR and NAWCTSD insignia. During its operational career, this aircraft flew with both Fleet squadrons and the Blue Angels. It was previously located at the former Naval Air Station Atlanta, Georgia and was relocated to NSA Orlando just prior to the former's closure due to BRAC.

== See also ==
- Air Force Agency for Modeling and Simulation
- United States Army Simulation and Training Technology Center
- University of Central Florida research centers
