= Alexander Cartwright (academic) =

American academic administrator

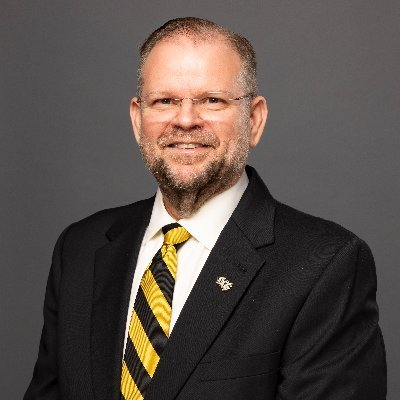

President of the University of Central Florida
- Incumbent
- Assumed office April 13, 2020
- Preceded by: Thad Seymour (acting)

23rd Chancellor of the University of Missouri
- In office 2017–2020
- Preceded by: Garnett Stokes (acting)
- Succeeded by: Mun Choi

Personal details
- Education: University of Iowa (BS, MS, PhD)

Academic background
- Thesis: Nonlinear Optical Properties of Hetero N-I-P-I Device Structures (1995)
- Doctoral advisor: Arthur Smirl

Academic work
- Discipline: Electrical engineering Computer engineering
- Institutions: State University of New York; University of Missouri; University of Central Florida

Alexander Nevin Cartwright is an American academic and President of the University of Central Florida in Orlando, Florida. Before his nomination to UCF, he was the chancellor of the University of Missouri in Columbia, Missouri, and Provost and Executive Vice Chancellor of the State University of New York. On March 20, 2020, Cartwright was nominated by a unanimous vote of the UCF Board of Trustees to become President-Elect of UCF, and was then confirmed by the Florida Board of Governors on March 25, 2020. He became the acting President of UCF on April 13, 2020, succeeding Interim President Thad Seymour.

Academic offices
Preceded by R. Bowen Loftin	9th Chancellor of the University of Missouri; 2017–2020	Succeeded by Mun Choi
Preceded by Thad Seymour (interim)	6th President of the University of Central Florida; 2020–present	Incumbent
