= University of Central Florida =

Public university in Orlando, Florida, US

- Former name: Florida Technological University (1966–1978)
- Motto: "Reach for the Stars"
- Type: Public research university
- Established: June 10, 1963; 63 years ago
- Founder: Florida Legislature
- Parent institution: State University System of Florida
- Accreditation: HLC
- Academic affiliations: ORAU; space-grant
- Endowment: $266.7 million (FY2025)
- Budget: $2.1 billion (FY2025)
- President: Alexander Cartwright
- Provost: John Buckwalter
- Academic staff: 2,865 (fall 2025)
- Total staff: 13,708 (fall 2025)
- Students: 70,674 (fall 2025)
- Undergraduates: 60,083 (fall 2025)
- Postgraduates: 10,591 (fall 2025)
- Location: Orange County, Florida, United States (Note: UCF is located in the census-designated place of University, but has an Orlando, Florida mailing address.); 28.6016°N 81.2005°W
- Campus: Large suburb Main: 1,415 acres (573 ha) Total: 1,893 acres (766 ha)
- Other campuses: Bay Lake; Clermont; Cocoa; Daytona Beach; Downtown Orlando; Kissimmee; Sanford
- Colors: Black and gold
- Nickname: Knights
- Sporting affiliations: NCAA Division I FBS – Big 12; Sun Belt
- Mascots: Knightro; Pegasus and the Golden Knight; Citronaut (Legacy)
- Website: ucf.edu

The University of Central Florida (UCF) is a public research university with its main campus in unincorporated Orange County, Florida, near Orlando, Florida, United States. It is part of the State University System of Florida. With 70,674 students as of the fall 2025 semester, it has the second-largest on-campus student body of any public university in the United States. UCF is classified among "R1: Doctoral Universities – Very high research spending and doctorate production."

UCF was founded in 1963 and opened in 1968 as Florida Technological University. The new state university was intended in part to train scientists and engineers for the growing aerospace and defense workforce around Kennedy Space Center and what is now Cape Canaveral Space Force Station. As the curriculum widened beyond engineering and the physical sciences, the school was renamed the University of Central Florida in 1978. It remains active in space-related research through units such as the Florida Space Institute and the NASA Florida Space Grant Consortium.

Most students attend the main campus, 13 miles (21 km) east of downtown Orlando. The university offers more than 230 degree programs through 13 colleges, including the Health Sciences Campus at Lake Nona Medical City, the Rosen College of Hospitality Management, and a campus in downtown Orlando. Since opening it has awarded more than 450,000 degrees.

The university's colors are black and gold. Its athletic teams, the UCF Knights, compete in NCAA Division I as members of the Big 12 Conference.

== History ==
=== Founding ===
The university's first Knights and Pegasus logo, used when the school was Florida Technological University

The Florida Legislature authorized a new public university in east-central Florida on June 10, 1963, when Governor Farris Bryant signed Senate Bill No. 125. Local officials had lobbied for the campus as the region’s population and the workforce around the Space Coast grew in the early 1960s. Former Senate President William A. Shands and Senator Beth Johnson were among the bill’s principal backers. The university was founded as a coeducational state university with the mission of educating students for space-age careers in engineering and other technological professions.

On January 24, 1964, the Florida Board of Regents bought 1,000 acres (400 ha) of undeveloped land along Alafaya Trail in northeast Orange County for $500,000. Area residents later donated another 227 acres (92 ha) and helped raise more than $1 million toward the site. In December 1965 the board appointed Charles Millican as the university’s first president. After consulting a citizen advisory group, Millican selected the name Florida Technological University and helped design the Pegasus seal. He also introduced the motto “Reach for the Stars” and the paired slogans “accent on excellence” and “accent on the individual.” Millican laid out the main campus as a set of pedestrian rings inside a loop road, a plan later compared to mid-century planned-community design.

Millican and Governor Claude Kirk broke ground in March 1967. Classes opened on October 7, 1968, with 1,948 students in 55 degree programs across five colleges, 90 instructors, and about 150 staff members. From the start the university drew students interested in engineering jobs tied to Kennedy Space Center and area defense contractors, but it opened with five colleges rather than as a federal laboratory school. The first graduating class, 423 students, received degrees on June 14, 1970. Astronaut and Orlando native John Young spoke at commencement.

Millican chose the school colors. An early unofficial mascot, the Citronaut — an orange-astronaut hybrid — did not last. After a short-lived “Vincent the Vulture” period, students in 1971 voted for the Knight of Pegasus as the athletic mascot. The teams later competed as the Golden Knights and then the Knights.

=== Expansion ===
Entering office in 1978, the university's second president, Trevor Colbourn, recognized the diversification and growth of UCF's academic programs away from its strictly technological and scientific beginnings. As the university developed strong business, education, and liberal arts programs, Colbourn recognized that the university's name no longer reflected its mission. From its establishment the university was known as Florida Technological University, nicknamed Florida Tech, until December 1978, when Governor Reubin Askew signed legislation changing the school's name to the University of Central Florida.

Colbourn established the university's honors program, and started the university's first satellite campus. In addition, he was responsible for constructing the Central Florida Research Park adjacent to the UCF campus, founded in 1978. The park serves as a major focus of simulation for space and defense-related research. It was part of Colbourn's plan to make UCF a world-class partnership university. Among the university's first partners were Lockheed Martin and the United States Navy, and Colbourn led the push to found both the Institute for Simulation and Training and the Center for Research and Education in Optics and Lasers in 1986. During his tenure, enrollment increased from 11,000 in 1978 to over 18,000 in 1989. Colbourn also supported the university's athletic programs. He was responsible for establishing the school's football program in 1979, which began an era of growth for the university. In April 1979, UCF awarded its 15,000th degree.

=== Hitt presidency ===
In March 1992, John C. Hitt became UCF's fourth president. Once known mainly as a small commuter and technology school, UCF administrators began to increase its academic and research standing while also evolving into a more traditional research university. When Hitt took office, UCF's enrollment was 20,302. As of 2014, 60,821 students attended classes on 12 campuses spread across central Florida. The university consisted of 13 colleges and employed more than 10,150 faculty and staff. During this time, UCF raised admissions standards, increased research funding, built new facilities, and established notable partnerships with major research institutions.

The university's athletic program also grew with an on-campus football stadium, new basketball arena, more on-campus housing, and the development of the UCF College of Medicine at Lake Nona. Until 1999, the Knights were represented by a jouster from the Medieval Times dinner show in nearby Kissimmee, Florida. That same year, Knightro was introduced at the staple homecoming event, Spirit Splash.

During its spring 2010 graduation ceremonies, UCF awarded its 200,000th degree, less than five years after awarding its 150,000th.

==== Colbourn Hall scandal ====
In August 2018, the state university system's board of governors and the Florida legislature opened an investigation into the university for misuse of state funds. On September 13, 2018, UCF admitted to misappropriating money intended for educational and operating expenses to build the new $38 million Trevor Colbourn Hall, leading to the resignation of CFO Bill Merck. In January 2019, UCF severed ties with President Emeritus John Hitt after the investigation proved that UCF had misspent or planned to misspend over $85 million between 2013 and 2018. Newly appointed president Dale Whittaker, who was a provost at UCF during Hitt's tenure, resigned in February 2019 after just seven months in office over allegations that he also knew about the misappropriation of funds. Board of trustees chairman Marcos Marchena also resigned that month. In August 2019, the final report into additional UCF construction projects revealed the balance of misdirected funds between July 2010 and August 2018 was $99.61 million (equivalent to $147.07 million in 2025). The report found that key people in the university leadership were aware of the misdirection of the funds. UCF was fined by the state for 120% the cost of the misused funds.

=== Cartwright presidency ===
Alexander Cartwright is the fifth and current president of UCF. He became the president on April 13, 2020, succeeding acting president Thad Seymore, who took over following Whittaker's resignation in February 2019.

== Campuses ==
=== Main campus ===
The University of Central Florida main campus is located in the University census-designated place, along Alafaya Trail east of Orlando, Florida.

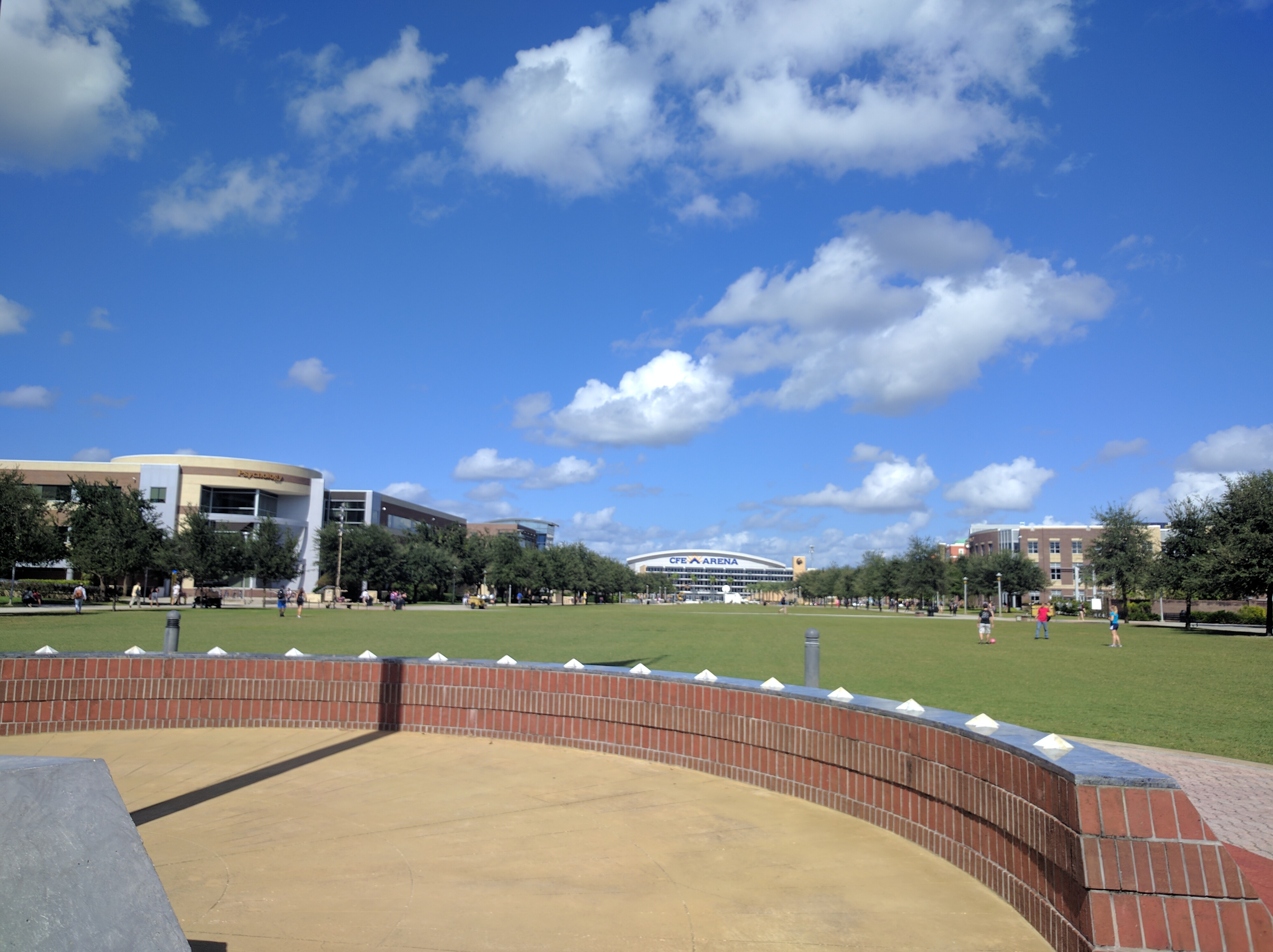
Memory Mall

The campus is designed to be pedestrian-oriented, with a series of concentric circles. The outermost circle is Gemini Blvd, which is also the main road for vehicular traffic on campus. Inside of Gemini, there is Apollo Circle, Mercury Circle, and finally Pegasus Circle as the innermost circle.

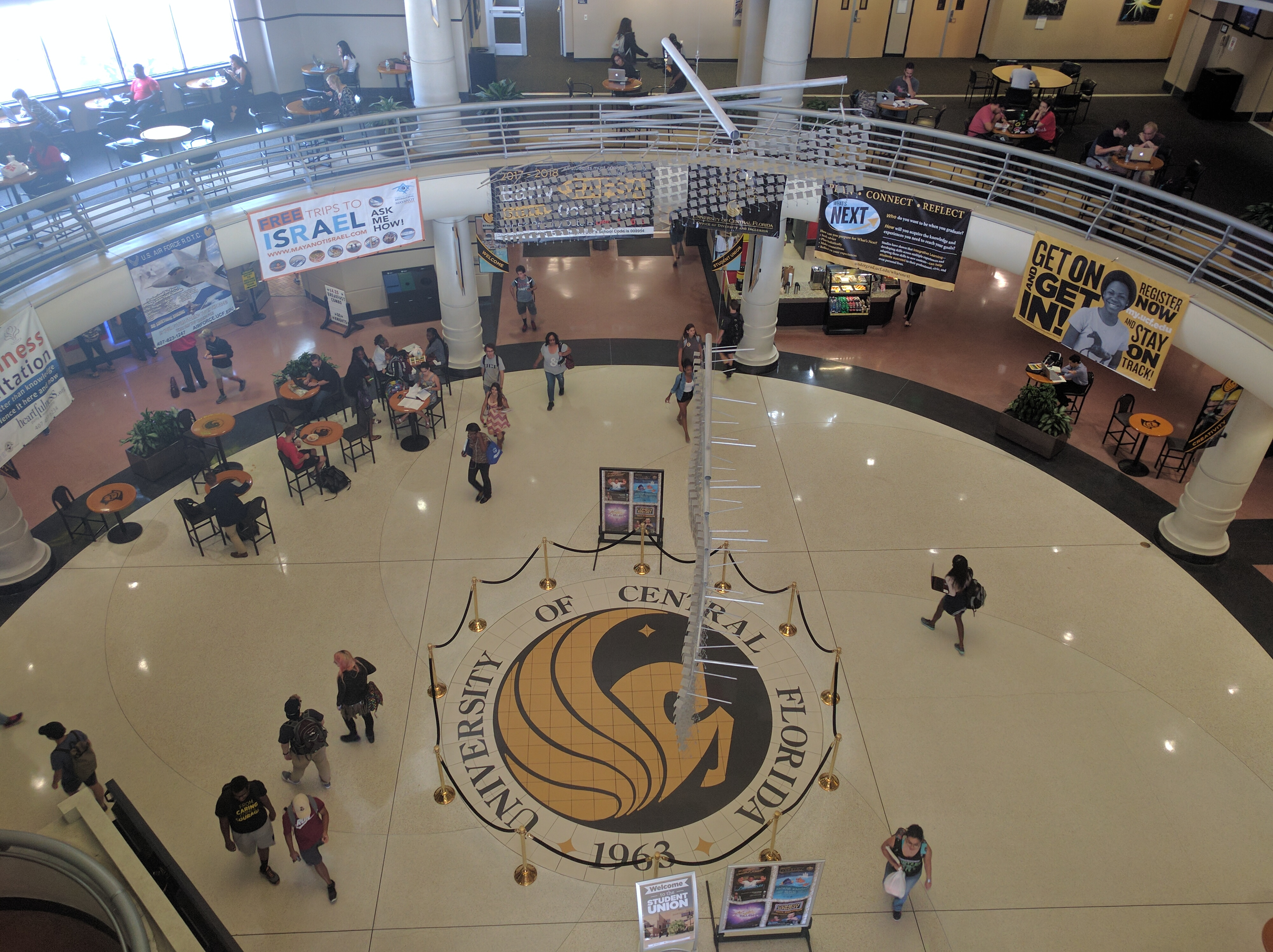
Student Union

Pegasus Circle contains the student union, with the John C. Hitt Library located directly to the south of it. All academic buildings are located inside of Gemini, with the circle divided up into pie-shaped sections for each college. As there are very few roads inside of Gemini, many buildings' loading docks are accessible only by sidewalks and thus receive most deliveries at night. The University of Central Florida campus is one of only two in the nation with a concentric circle design, the other being the University of California, Irvine. Newsweek ranked UCF as having the 20th most beautiful university campus in the country in 2011.

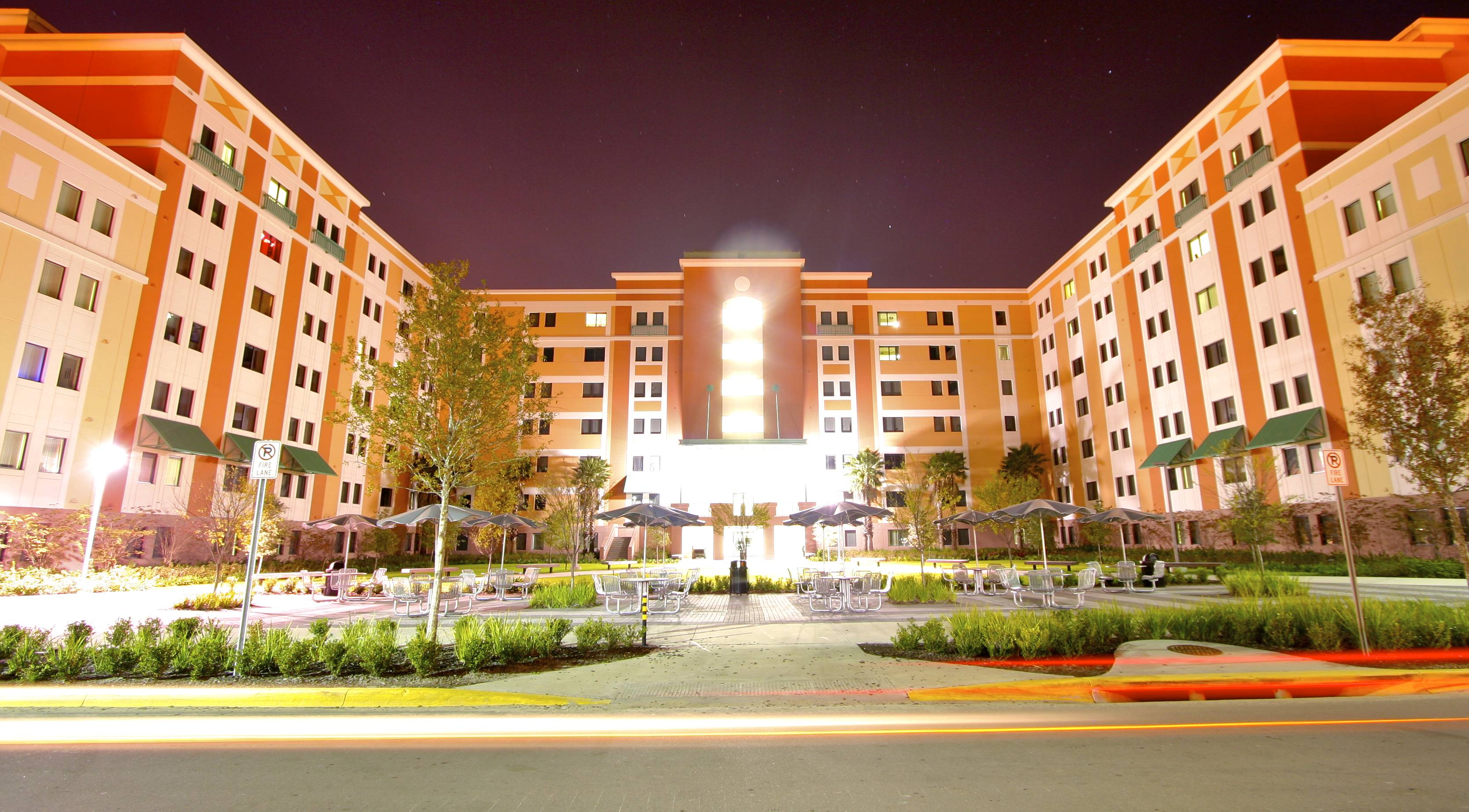
UCF Tower student housing dorms

Student housing is provided along the perimeter of the campus. Outside of Gemini, the campus is divided up into different themed sections. The northwest side of campus includes Greek communities and on-campus residences.

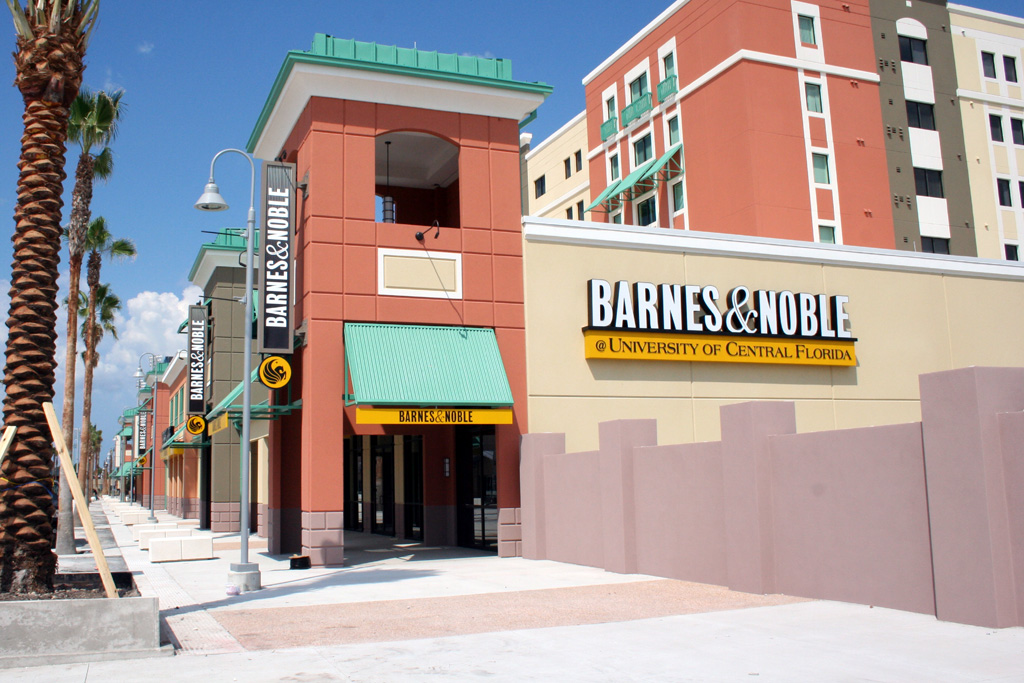
East retail and Tower III at Knights Plaza

The north side contains Knights Plaza, an uptown style athletic village with stores and restaurants, the east side contains the Arboretum of the University of Central Florida and the engineering wing.

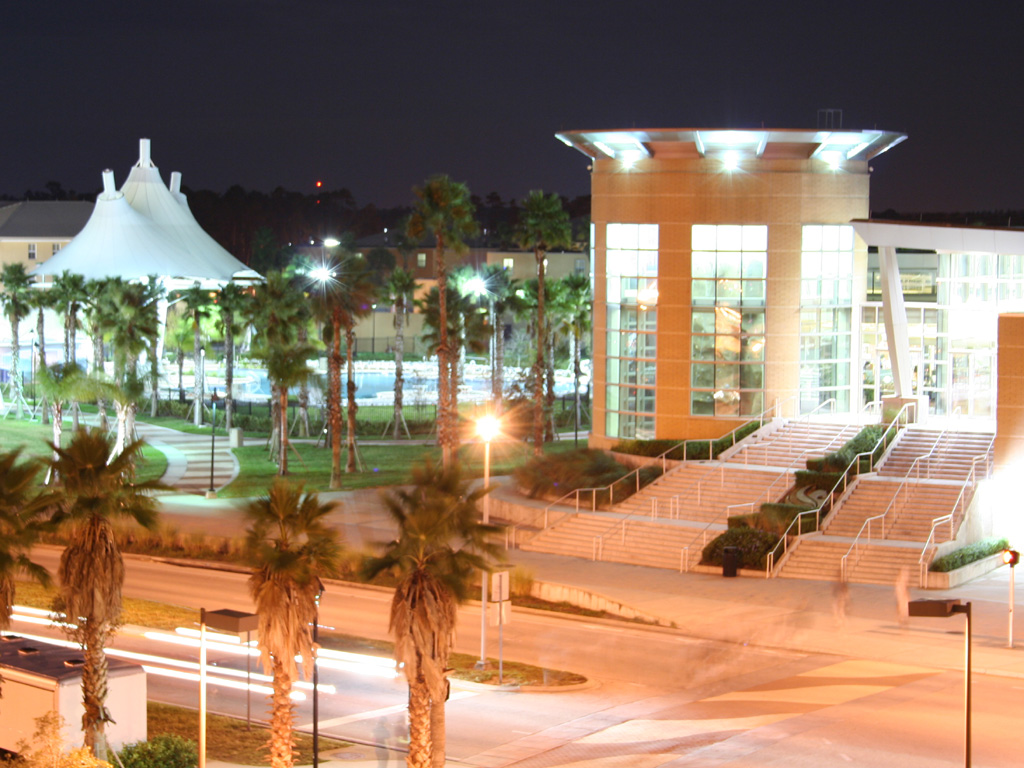
UCF Recreation and Wellness Center

The south side contains student recreation and wellness facilities, leisure pool, recreation park, and more student housing. Also located directly south of the main campus is Central Florida Research Park, which is the seventh largest research park in the nation and the largest in Florida, housing over 116 corporations. The park provides more than 10,000 jobs to over 500 students and thousands of alumni.

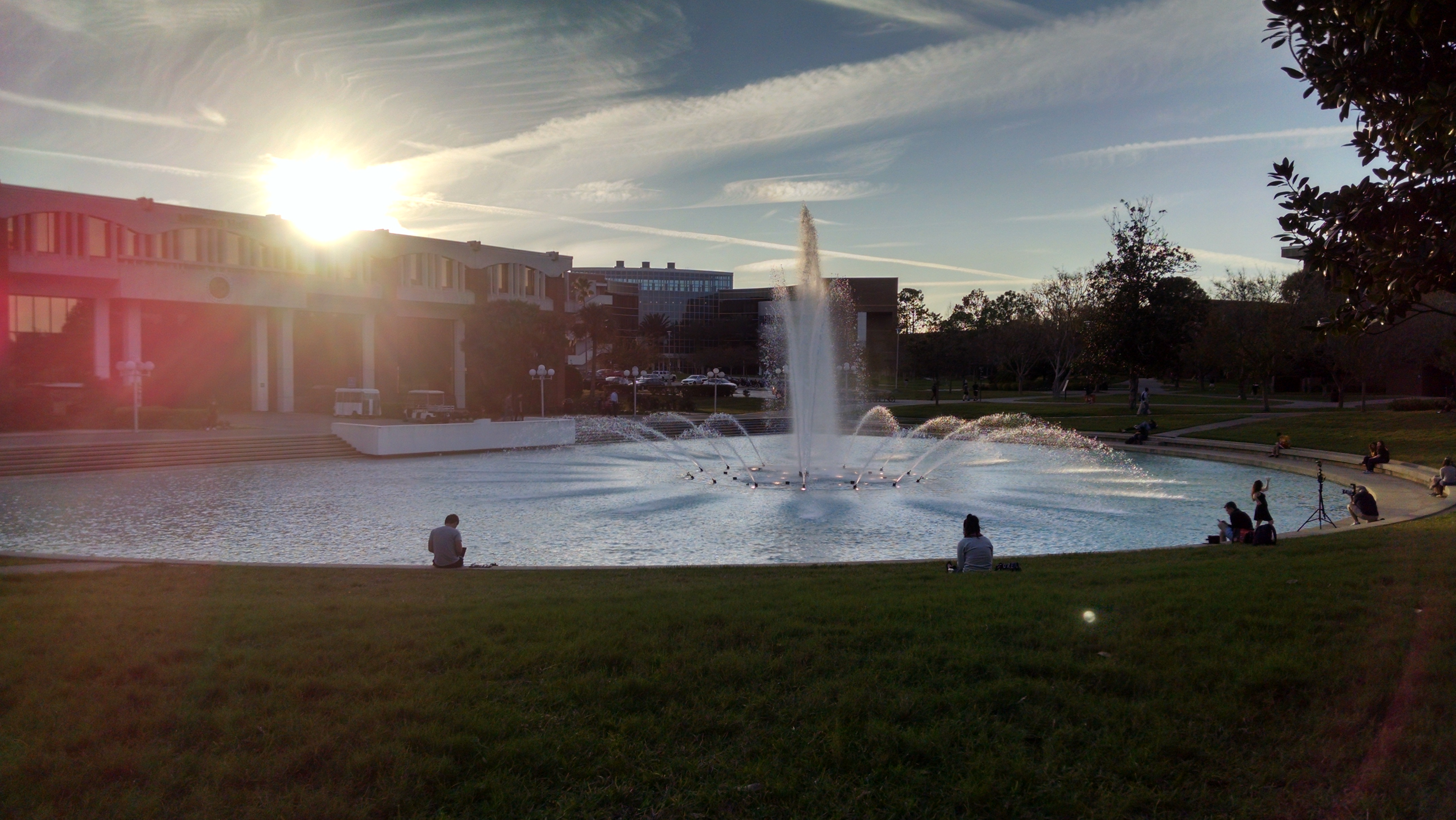
Reflecting Pond and Millican Hall

Main Campus is one of the safest branches nationally in comparison of all branches in the US. The percent of crimes in Main Campus decreased from 0.12% (in 2010) to 0.07% (in 2014) crimes per year.

=== Regional campuses ===
In addition to the Orlando campus, the University of Central Florida has several other campuses to service the Central Florida region.

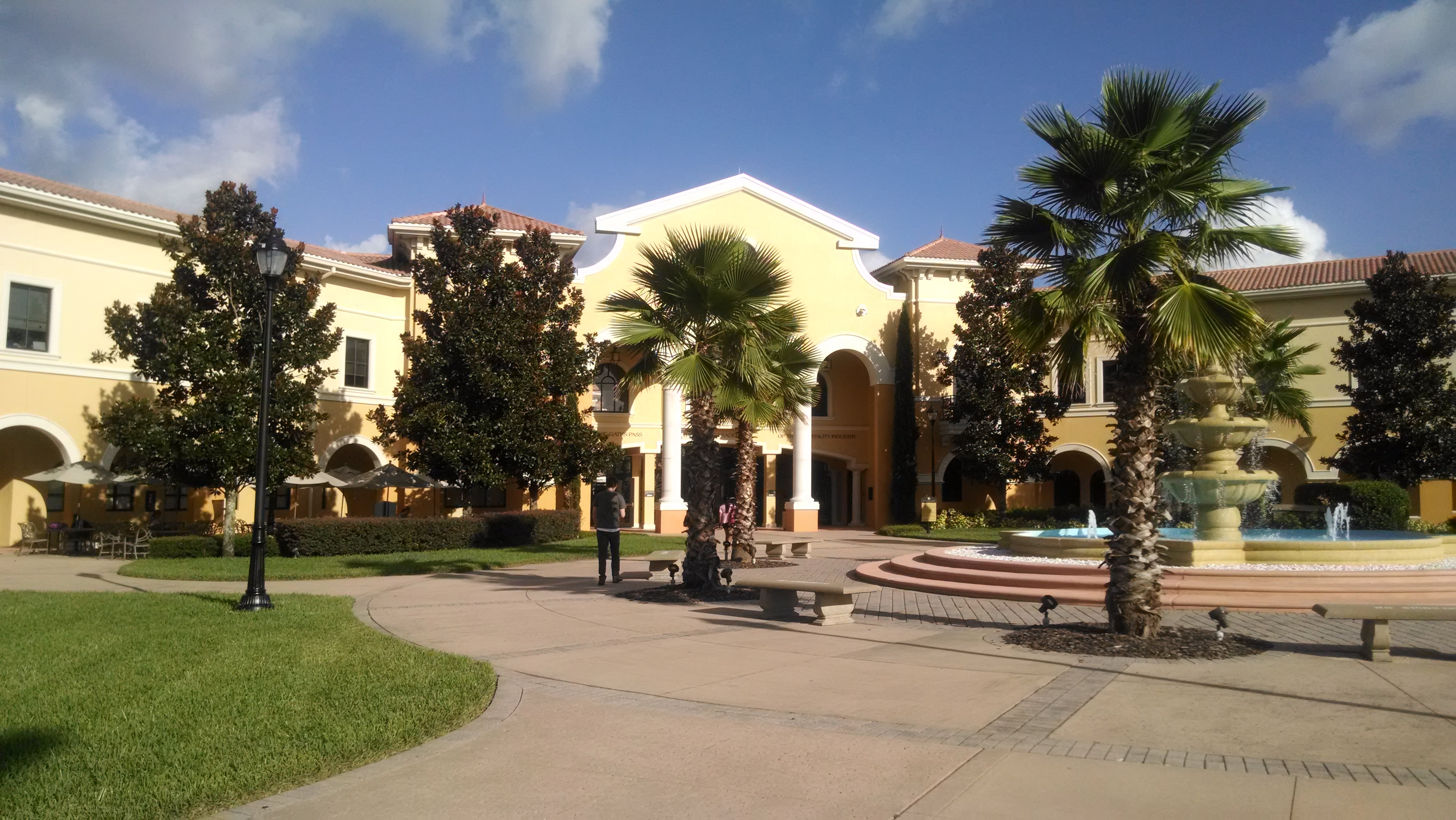
Rosen College of Hospitality

In Orlando, there is another campus, located in downtown Orlando: the UCF Health Sciences Campus located at Lake Nona, Orlando, Florida. In addition, the Rosen College of Hospitality Management is located away from the main campus, in close proximity to the heart of Orlando's tourism industries near Universal Studios and Disney Parks, Experiences and Products.

==== Downtown Campus ====
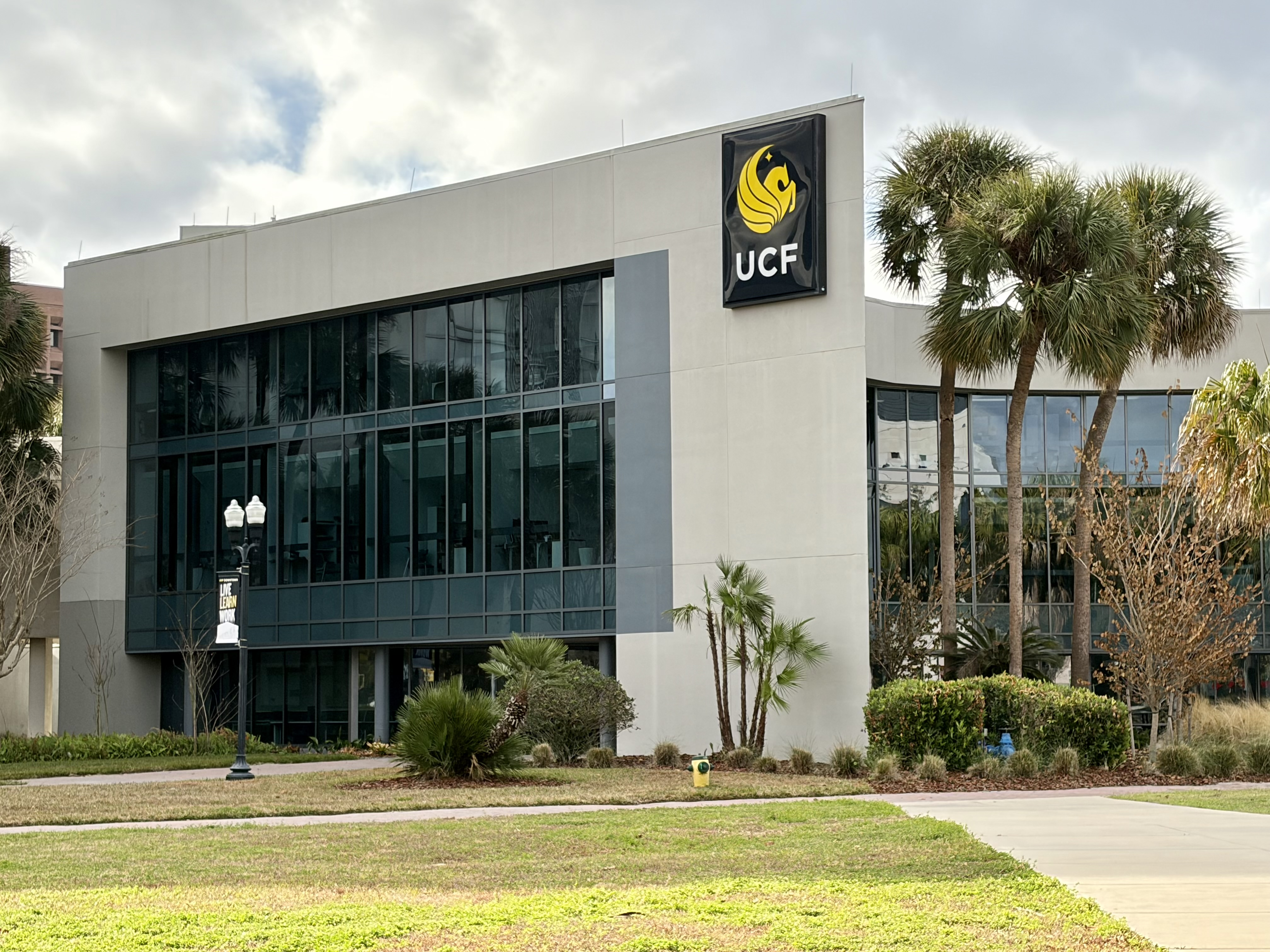
UCF Center for Emerging Media in Downtown Orlando

In 2019, a 15-acre (6-hectare) campus was opened in Downtown Orlando in collaboration with Valencia West. It includes the Dr. Phillips Academic Commons, Union West student housing, and the UCF Center for Emerging Media buildings.

==== Health Sciences Campus at Lake Nona ====
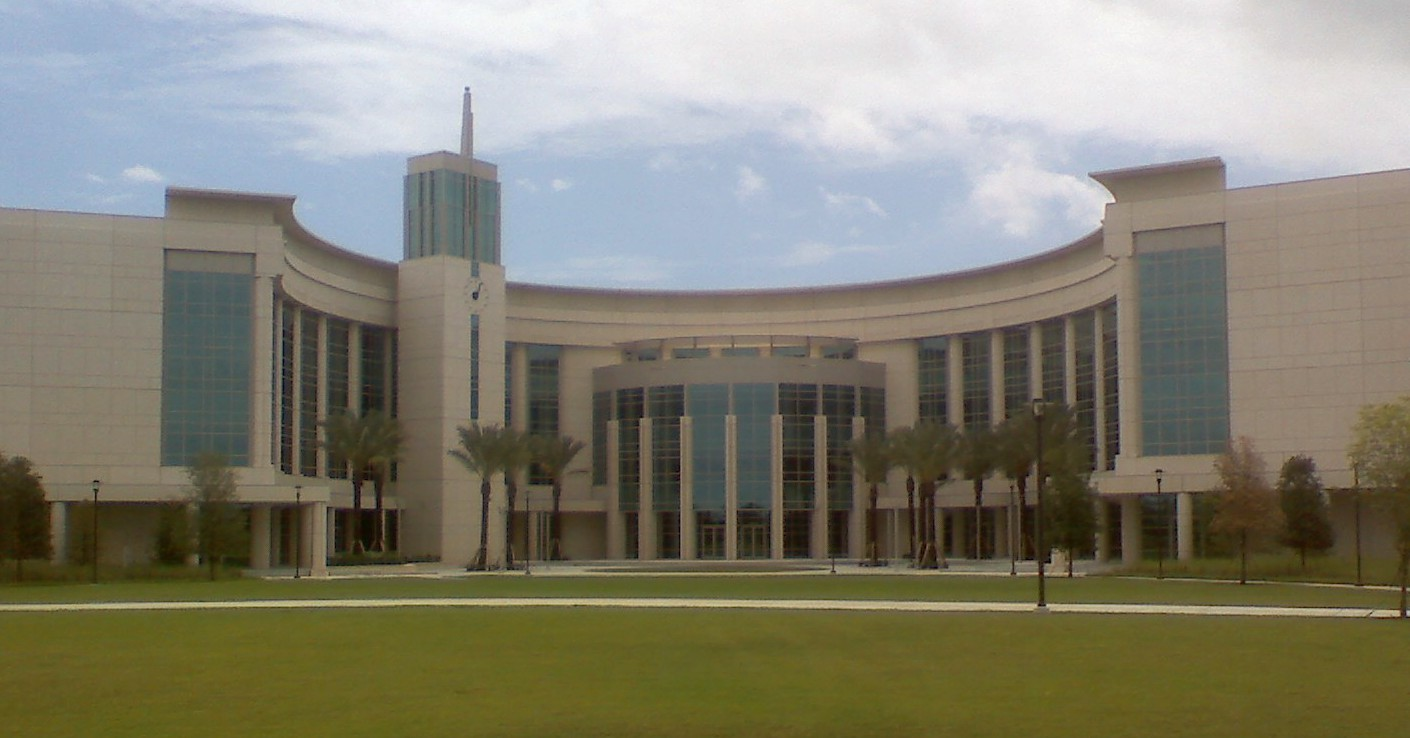
UCF College of Medicine at Lake Nona

The 50-acre (20-hectare) UCF Health Sciences Campus at Lake Nona includes the UCF College of Medicine and the Burnett Biomedical Sciences Building. The Burnham Institute for Medical Research, a Veterans Affairs Medical Center, Nemours Children's Hospital, M.D. Anderson Cancer Research Institute, turning the area into a medical city. The campus will also serve as the future home of the UCF College of Nursing and the newly approved UCF College of Dental Medicine. The College of Medicine welcomed its charter class in August 2009.

Upon completion of construction, the campus could accommodate as many as 5,000 upper division, professional, and graduate students and faculty members in the health-related programs, and include up to two million square feet of research and instruction space.

== Administration ==
As a part of the State University System of Florida, UCF falls under the purview of the Florida Board of Governors. The University of Central Florida is headed by the board of trustees, which governs the university, consisting of 13 appointed to staggered five-year terms by the Florida Board of Governors. The Student Government president and the faculty chair also serve on the board for the duration of their one-year terms of office.

The president of the University of Central Florida is the university's principal executive officer. The office was formed upon the university's creation in 1963. The president is appointed by the board of trustees with the consent of the Florida Board of Governors and leads the university through its daily business. Today, the president's office is in Millican Hall on the university's main campus, and the president lives in the Burnett House, also on the main campus. The fourth president of UCF, John C. Hitt, served from 1992 to 2018 and was succeeded by incumbent university president Dale Whittaker. After Whittaker resigned in 2019, Thad Seymour Jr. was appointed from his previous position as UCF's vice president for partnerships and chief innovation officer to serve as the university's interim president until the board of trustees should choose a replacement.

Due to cutbacks in federal, state and local budgets, UCF has had over $140 million in funds cut from its operating budget since 2008. This included a $53 million cut to UCF's 2012–13 fiscal year budget by the Florida legislature. So far UCF has endured the budget cuts by implementing a hiring freeze, ending some faculty perks, such as free seminars, cutting executive pay, and wise management of funds. To help counter the budget decreases, the university received $18 million in funds from the American Recovery and Reinvestment Act. UCF's operating budget for the 2014–15 fiscal year is $1.5 billion, a 13.9% increase from the previous year. UCF's financial endowment, administered by the University of Central Florida Foundation, Inc., was valued at $162 million in 2020.

== Academics ==
=== Admissions ===
Fall first-time freshman admission statistics
	2022	2021	2020	2019	2018	2017
Applicants	54,977	48,927	47,957	45,118	41,816	37,693
Admits	22,560	17,797	21,661	20,016	17,786	18,810
Enrolls	7,512	7,091	8,039	7,323	7,234	6,860
Admit rate	41.0%	36.4%	45.2%	44.4%	42.5%	49.9%
Yield rate	33.3%	39.8%	37.1%	36.6%	40.7%	36.5%
SAT composite*	1200–1360 (71%†)	1170–1350 (73%†)	1160–1340 (77%†)	1170–1340 (79%†)	1160–1340 (70%†)	1150–1320 (60%†)
ACT composite*	25–29 (29%†)	25–30 (27%†)	25–30 (23%†)	25–30 (21%†)	25–29 (30%†)	24–29 (40%†)
* middle 50% range † percentage of first-time freshmen who chose to submit

UCF's admission rate for first-time-in-college freshmen has declined from 61% of prospective students admitted in the fall of 2005, to 42% for fall 2020.

34% of accepted applicants were in the top ten percent of their graduating class, while 72% of accepted applicants were in the top quarter of their high school class rankings. Freshmen enrolled in fall 2020 posted average SAT scores of 1320, ACT scores of 28.7 and average high school weighted GPAs of 4.18. UCF is in the top 20 percent of universities in the nation for SAT average and the top 25 percent for GPA average. 71% of undergraduates receive financial aid. 90% of students receive scholarships through the Florida Bright Futures program. Forty percent of incoming freshman received Advanced Placement, International Baccalaureate, or an equivalent college credit upon entrance, while 30% of the freshman class received merit based scholarships. The retention rate of the 2010 freshman class was 87%.

More freshmen and transfer students applied to UCF during 2015 than any other public university in Florida, and UCF also awarded more bachelor's degrees than any other Florida public university that year. In 2010, UCF was ranked 2nd in Florida, and 34th in the United States, by the number of National Merit Scholars enrolled. 335 National Merit Scholars enrolled at UCF for the fall 2020 term.

=== Classification ===
The University of Central Florida is accredited by the Higher Learning Commission (HLC), a U.S. Department of Education–recognized institutional accreditor based in Chicago that historically served colleges in the Midwestern United States. From 1970 to 2026, UCF was accredited by the Southern Association of Colleges and Schools Commission on Colleges (SACSCOC). In 2022, Florida law (SB 7044; §1008.47) required public universities to change accreditors after each cycle; UCF received initial HLC accreditation in 2025, the first State University System of Florida institution to complete the switch.

Its academic calendar is based on the semester system, with the typical fall semester running from the end of August until the beginning of December and the typical spring semester running from the beginning of January through the beginning of May. In addition, UCF offers four different summer semesters, ranging from 6 to 12 weeks long. The university is classified as a "large four-year, primarily nonresidential" university with a "comprehensive doctoral" graduate instructional program and "highest research activity".

=== Rankings ===
Academic rankings

National
- Forbes: 156
- U.S. News & World Report: 117 (tie)
- Washington Monthly: 17
- WSJ/College Pulse: 300

Global
- ARWU: 401–500
- QS: 701-710
- THE: 401–500
- U.S. News & World Report: 434 (tie)

National program rankings
Biological Sciences	144 (tie)
Business	Unranked
Chemistry	119 (tie)
Clinical Psychology	145 (tie)
Computer Science	64 (tie)
Criminology	22
Earth Sciences	155 (tie)
Education	40 (tie)
Engineering	74 (tie)
English	131 (tie)
Health Care Management	41 (tie)
Mathematics	125 (tie)
Medicine: Primary Care	Tier 4
Medicine: Research	Tier 3
Nursing: Master's	Unranked
Nursing: Doctorate	71 (tie)
Physical Therapy	42 (tie)
Physics	95 (tie)
Psychology	140 (tie)
Public Affairs	46 (tie)
Social Work	67 (tie)
Sociology	110 (tie)
Speech-Language Pathology	48 (tie)
Statistics	72 (tie)

Global program rankings
Chemistry	888 (tie)
Clinical Medicine	507 (tie)
Computer Science	219 (tie)
Economics & Business	334 (tie)
Electrical & Electronic Engineering	238 (tie)
Engineering	296 (tie)
Environment/Ecology	774 (tie)
Materials Science	436 (tie)
Mathematics	351
Nanoscience & Nanotechnology	325 (tie)
Optics	41
Physical Chemistry	413 (tie)
Physics	379 (tie)
Psychiatry/Psychology	260
Public, Environmental & Occupational Health	99 (tie)
Social Sciences & Public Health	99 (tie)

In the 2025 U.S. News & World Report rankings, UCF was tied for 117th in the National Universities category (tied for 57th among "Top Public Schools") and tied for the 15th "most innovative school". In addition, U.S. News & World Report ranked the University of Central Florida as the 9th best in online bachelor's program in the nation in 2025.Aviation Week Network also ranked UCF as the No. 1 provider of graduates to the U.S. aerospace and defense industry.U.S. News & World Report ranked UCF No. 1 in the nation for "homeland/national security and emergency management" programs in 2026, for the third consecutive year. Shanghai Ranking Global Ranking of Academic Subjects, UCF ranked No. 1 in the U.S. for "transportation science and technology".

=== Colleges ===
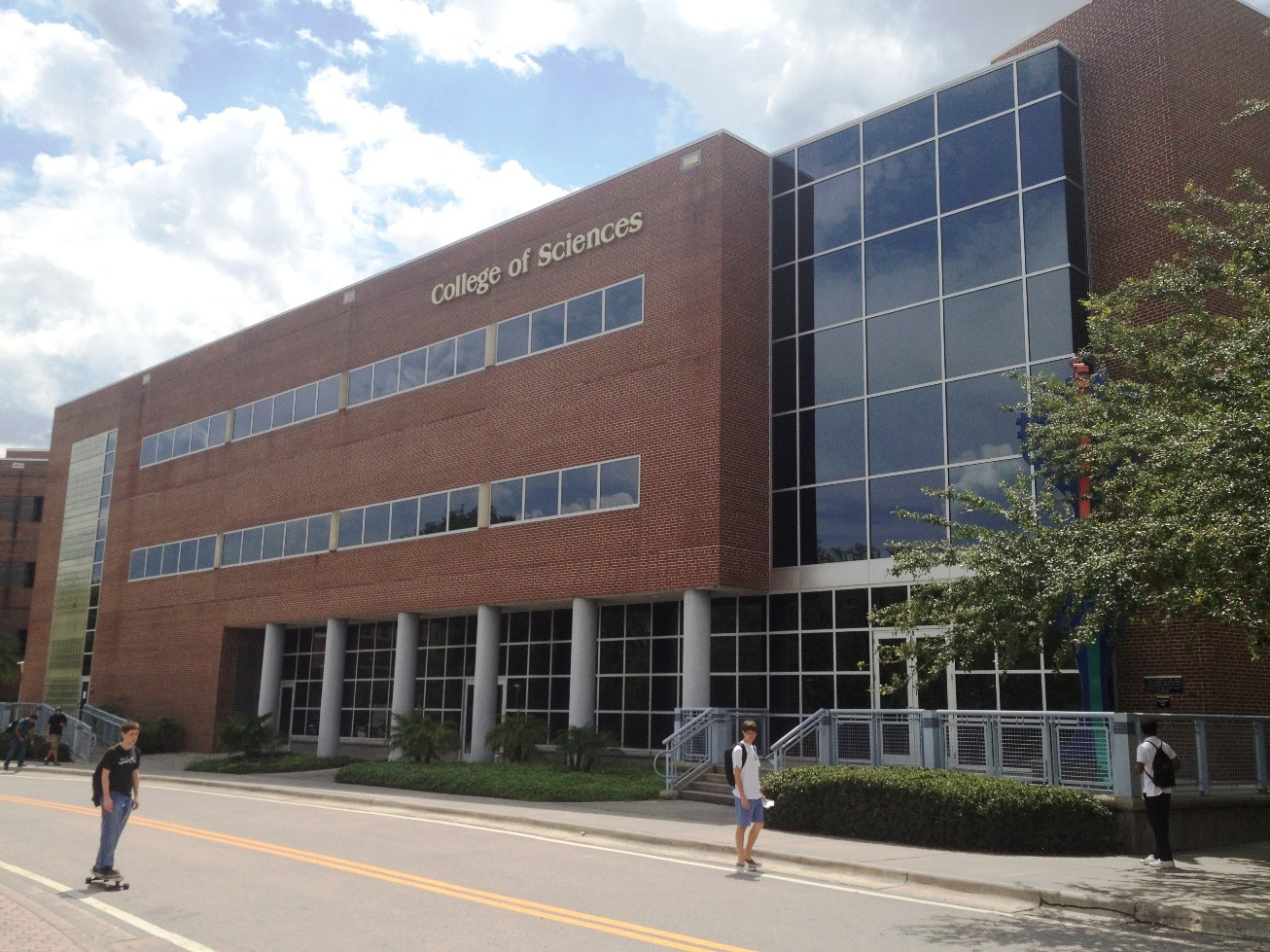
College of Sciences

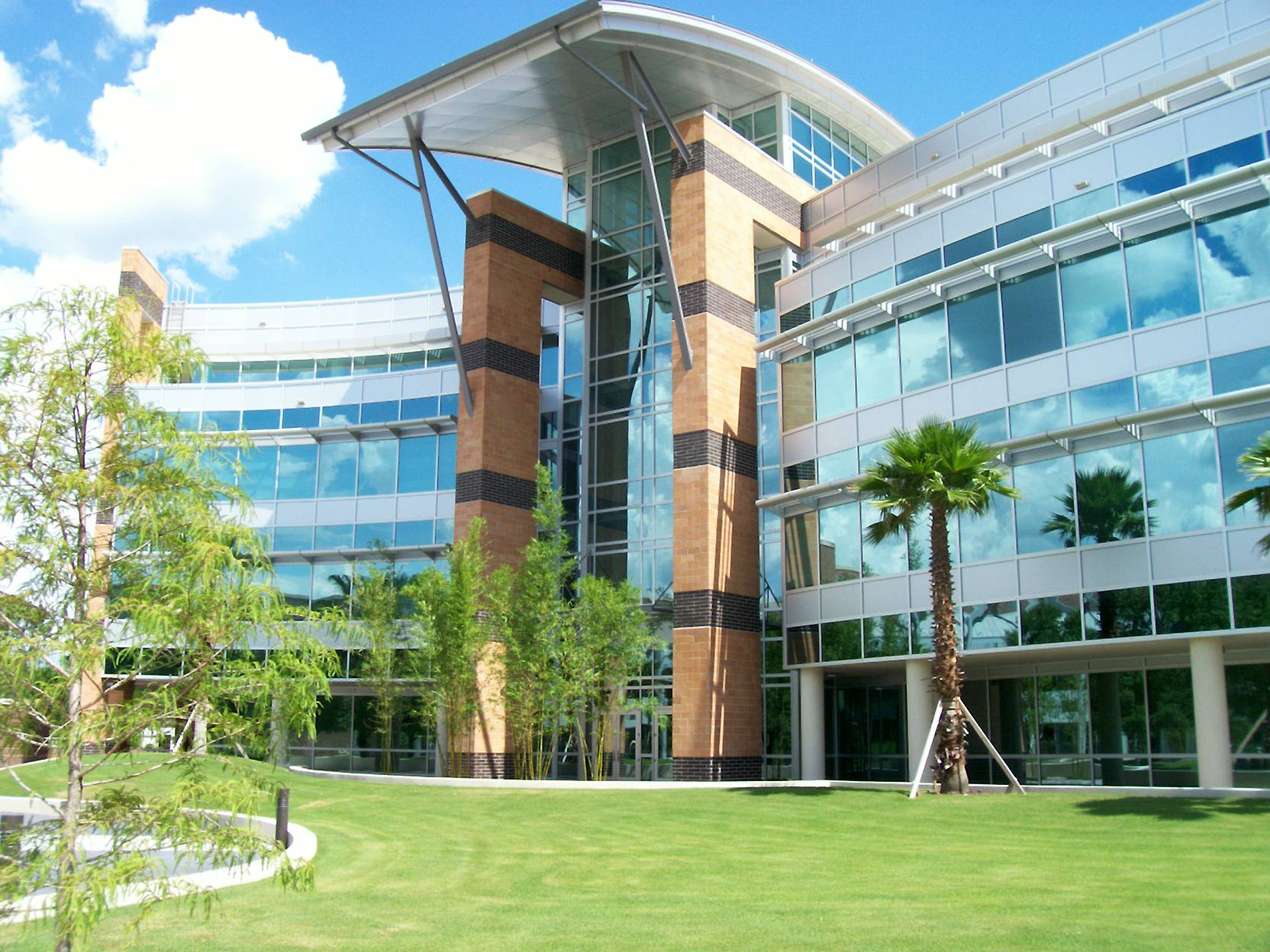
Engineering Center

Teaching Academy

The university houses 13 colleges, which offer 101 baccalaureate programs, 88 master's programs, 31 doctoral programs, three specialist programs, and a professional program (medicine). In addition, 75% of the faculty have doctorate degrees, and 46% have tenure. The 13 colleges house 41 separate degree-granting departments and schools.

By enrollment, the three largest undergraduate units are the College of Sciences, the College of Business Administration, and the Health Professions and Sciences. At the graduate level, the College of Graduate Studies serves as the central administrative unit of graduate education at the university. Graduate students are also students of one of the other 12 colleges at the university. The university is seeking approval for a College of Dental Medicine, which would be housed at the Health Sciences Campus in Lake Nona.

College/school founding
College/school	Year founded
Arts and Humanities	2005
Business Administration	1968
Education and Human Performance	1968
Engineering and Computer Science	1966
Graduate Studies	2008
Health Professions and Sciences (originally Health and Public Affairs)	2018 (1978 as Health and Public Affairs)
Medicine	2006
Nursing	2007
Optics and Photonics	2004
Rosen College of Hospitality Management	1983
Sciences	2005
Undergraduate Studies	2015
The Burnett Honors College	1998

==== The Burnett Honors College ====
The University Honors Program, administered by the Burnett Honors College is designed for 500 accomplished incoming undergraduates annually. Undergraduates enrolled in the Honors College participate in smaller classes with faculty, including individual research programs or assigned research in the area of a sponsoring faculty member. Another program offered by the college is Honors in the Major, which allows juniors and seniors to conduct original research within their major and write an undergraduate honors thesis.

==== College of Medicine ====
The UCF College of Medicine was established in 2006 by the Florida Legislature and the Florida Board of Governors to increase opportunities for medical education in Florida. The College of Medicine welcomed its charter class of 41 students on August 3, 2009, and eventually will produce about 120 medical graduates a year.

With more than 4,300 applications for 41 available positions, UCF broke the state university record for most applications, and for 2009 it was the most selective medical school in the country. For the class of 2014, there were 3,761 applicants and only 60 were accepted. This initial class had the highest average MCAT score, 32.2, and GPA, 3.8, of any incoming class of medical students in the state. The inaugural class had a median age of 28, with 25% of the class composed of out-of-state students. The charter class completed their first year of courses on the UCF main campus, while the Lake Nona Medical City was completed. Every member of the inaugural class received a full scholarship, including tuition and basic living expenses, for their entire four years at the university, valued at over $160,000.

The university aims for the college to become a research-intensive medical school, with the aid of the Burnett School of Biomedical Sciences, the UCF Lake Nona Cancer Center, a Veterans Affairs Medical Center, Nemours Children's Hospital, Tavistock Group, and a M.D. Anderson Cancer Research Institute, all located on the College of Medicine's Lake Nona campus.

==== Rosen College of Hospitality Management ====
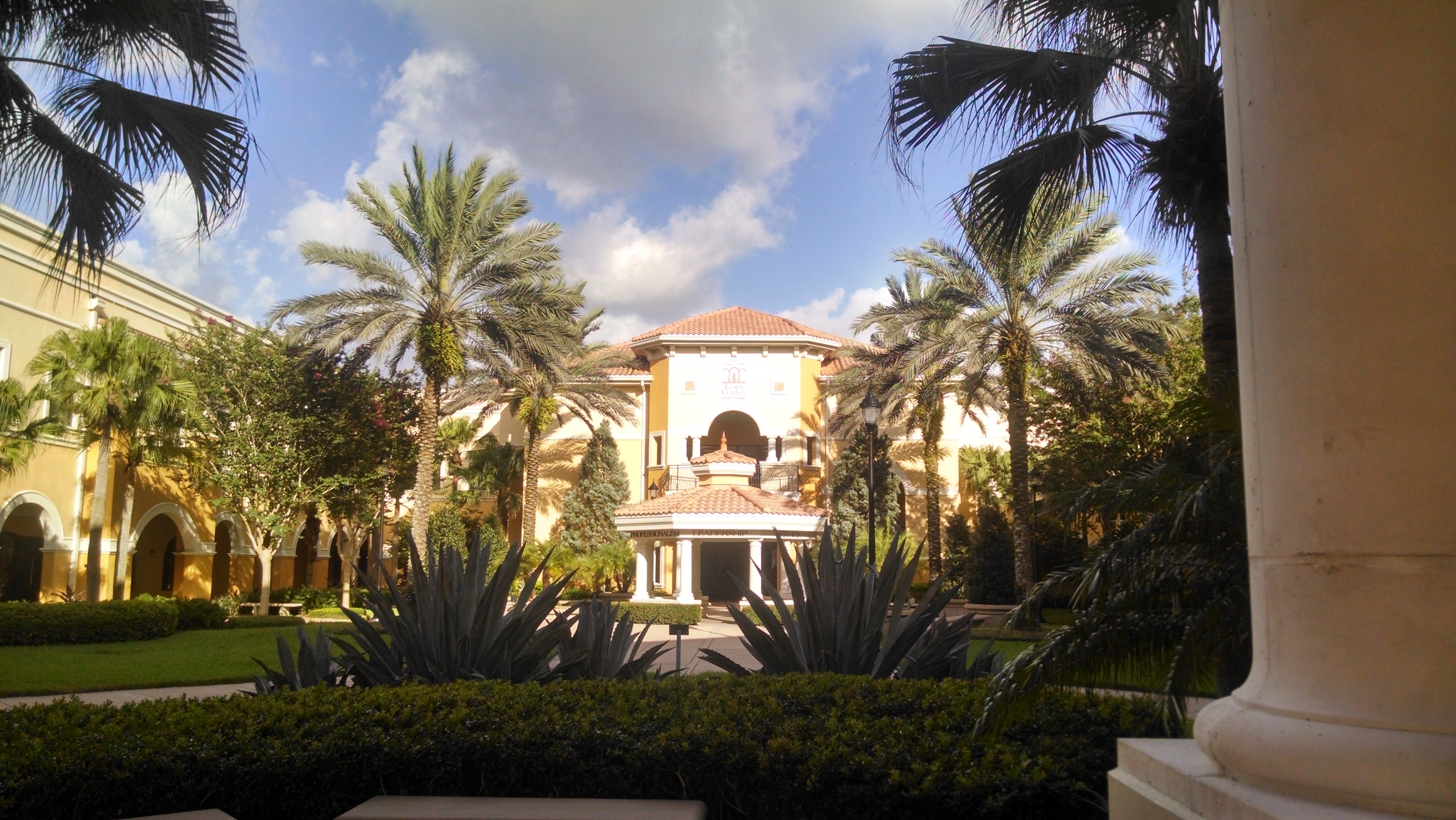
Rosen College of Hospitality Management

Located near the Orange County Convention Center on Universal Boulevard in Downtown Orlando, the college's 20-acre (8-hectare) campus is designed to imitate a resort-style feel, with various areas of the college named for major donors to the college (e.g. Disney Dining Room, Universal Orlando Library, Darden Auditorium, and the state-of-the-art Anheuser Busch Beer & Wine Lab). Regular Shuttle service is offered on most days that class is in session to and from the UCF Main Campus.

The college features an on-site Campus Life Office and Career Services Office that coordinate on-campus activities and career development events in conjunction with the UCF Student Government Association. In 2005, the university opened two on-campus housing buildings, able to house 400 residents. The college offers a variety of student organizations including associations such as Eta Sigma Delta (International Hospitality Management Honor Society), National Society of Minorities in Hospitality, the Professional Convention Management Association, and the National Association of Catering Executives, and the Global Association of Christian Hospitality Professionals.

=== Limited access programs ===
Among the colleges, a number of undergraduate academic programs are termed "limited access programs" which are programs where student demand exceeds available resources thus making admission to such program competitive. Examples include academic programs taught under the Nicholson School of Communication and the music, theatre, dance, and medical laboratory sciences schools or departments. Students must apply to join these programs separately from admission to the university. Criteria for admission varies but is generally very selective and includes factors such as indicators of ability, performance, creativity, and talent. Arts programs require competitive auditions and have some of the smallest numbers of undergraduate majors in the university.

=== Libraries ===
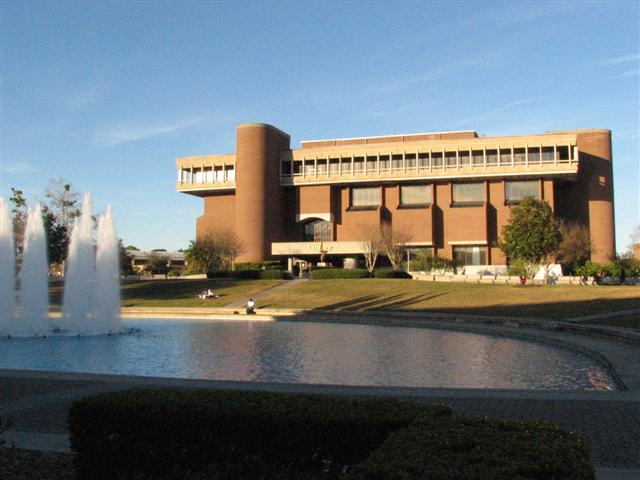
John C. Hitt Library

UCF Libraries collections include over 2.2 million print volumes, 3.2 million microforms, 330,000 government documents, 10,000 full text electronic journal subscriptions, 660,000 e-books, 40,000 media titles, a base of 43,000 serial subscriptions, in addition to special collections and university archives materials. Notable collections within the library include the Bryant West Indies collection, the Van Sickle Leftist Pamphlet collection, the Book Arts Collection, collections of materials on tourism and hospitality, and materials on the history of Central Florida. UCF Libraries is a partner within the State University System of Florida Libraries.

Most of the print and media collection is housed in the John C. Hitt Library, which is located on UCF's main campus and is open to students, faculty and the public seven days a week. The library is five stories tall, and was the first academic building on campus. Leonardo Nierman's sculpture Flame of Hope is displayed outside the entrance to the building, and Nierman's stained glass Genesis window is exhibited on the third floor of the library building. In 2012, the main campus library was dedicated to honor John C. Hitt, UCF's fourth president, who at the time was celebrating his twentieth anniversary as university president. In addition to the John C. Hitt Library, Rosen College library, Downtown Library, Curriculum Materials Center, and the Harriet F. Ginsburg Health Sciences Library, UCF operates libraries at nine of its regional campuses throughout Central Florida.

The student newspaper, the Central Florida Future, at one time was housed on the upper floor of the library before moving to the Central Florida Research Park. In 1984, a complete renovation of the original library was undertaken, as well as an addition that more than doubled the size of the building. University president Trevor Colbourn dedicated the newly remodeled and expanded library in February 1985. A $64.4 million expansion of the Hitt Library, which would add 212,400 square feet (19,730 m^{2}) of space, as well as an Automated Retrieval System was recently approved by the university's board of trustees but may be delayed due to budget cuts.

In 2022, the library began working on its 21st Century Library Project, a multi-phased plan designed to create additional space for student learning, technology, collaboration, and research expansion. The project upon completion will include the construction of a four-story automated retrieval center, increased quiet study space, and the creation of additional research and writing facilities on the fifth floor.

== Research ==
The University of Central Florida fosters research among its thirteen academic colleges and schools, partnerships with corporations such as Lockheed Martin, Disney, Boeing, L3Harris, Siemens, SpaceX, and Universal. UCF also houses a satellite campus in Cocoa, FL, near Kennedy Space Center. UCF is also a member of the Florida High Tech Corridor Council. The university has made noted research contributions to aerospace, optics, modeling and simulation, digital media, engineering and computer science, business administration, education, and hospitality management.

UCF is classified among "R1: Doctoral Universities – Very high research activity". According to the National Science Foundation, UCF spent $215.3 million on research and development in 2018, ranking it 107th in the nation. In 2009, UCF directly influenced 26,000 jobs and $1.96 billion in economic activity. When UCF's economic impact is combined with that of the Central Florida Research Park, the university and park influenced 46,000 jobs and $3.84 billion in economic activity in 2009. The new College of Medicine, which opened in August 2009, will create an estimated 30,000 local jobs and have an economic impact of $7.6 billion in its first few years.

Metropolitan Orlando sustains the world's largest recognized cluster of modeling, simulation and training companies. Located directly south of the main campus is the Central Florida Research Park, which is one of the largest research parks in the nation, providing more than 10,000 jobs. Research Park is the 7th largest research park in the nation, with 2,700 Department of Defense, NASA personnel, and direct support contractors. Collectively, those defense organizations manage $5.2 billion in contracts every year. Many of the employees in Research Park work with UCF researchers and students on projects in the sciences, engineering, photonics and optics, modeling and simulation, and health-related fields.

The university also conducts research through numerous institutions and centers, including the Center for Research and Education in Optics and Lasers, Florida Solar Energy Center, Institute for Simulation and Training and Institute for Economic Competitiveness.

=== Space Institute ===
UCF founded and governs the Florida Space Institute along with government partnerships such as NASA. As a result of their contributions, 17 UCF researchers had asteroids named after them. UCF researchers found and named a planet in 2012 after the discovery of UCF-1.01. The U.S. National Astronomy and Ionosphere Center is also managed by UCF. A 2015 Aviation Week & Space Technology workforce study named UCF the No. 1 supplier of engineers to aerospace and defense industries.

== Student life ==
=== Student body ===
Enrollment in UCF (2017–2023)
Academic year	Undergraduates	Graduate	Total enrollment
2017–2018	56,972	8,726	66,183
2018–2019	58,913	9,168	68,571
2019–2020	59,483	9,553	69,525
2020–2021	61,456	10,002	71,948
2021–2022	60,075	9,847	70,406
2022–2023	58,749	9,210	68,442

Undergraduate demographics as of fall 2023
Race and ethnicity	Total
White	44%
Hispanic	31%
Black	9%
Asian	8%
Two or more races	5%
International student	3%
Unknown	1%
Economic diversity
Low-income (Note: The percentage of students who received an income-based federal Pell grant intended for low-income students.)	34%
Affluent (Note: The percentage of students who are a part of the American middle class at the bare minimum.)	66%

UCF's student body consists of 61,456 undergraduates and 10,002 graduate and professional students and 490 M.D. students from all 67 Florida counties, all 50 states and 157 countries. Study abroad programs allow UCF students to study and conduct research in 42 programs in 21 countries. The ten largest undergraduate disciplines at UCF are business management and administration, health professions and related, psychology, education, engineering, biology, multi/interdisciplinary studies, computer and information sciences, hospitality, and social sciences.

UCF's enrollment has increased by over 60% this century, from 33,453 in 2000 to 64,318 in 2016. Of the more than 60,000 students, 11% are graduate and professional students, while women make up 55% of the student body. Nearly 20 percent of UCF faculty are minorities.

Due to budget decreases and increased demands on the university, the UCF board of trustees, with the approval of the board of governors and the Florida legislature, approved a 15% increase in tuition for the 2012–13 academic year. For the 2020–21 academic year, undergraduate tuition costs were $212.28 per credit hour for in-state students and $748.89 per credit hour for out-of-state students. Graduate tuition costs were $369.65 per credit hour for in-state students and $1,194.05 per credit hour for out-of-state students. Tuition for the medical school is $25,490 for both in-state and out-of-state students. Estimated annual cost for undergraduate students is $22,2849 for Florida residents and $38,949 for non-Florida residents. Expected costs for graduate students are $22,072 for in-state students and $38,878 for out-of-state students. About 8% of tuition fees are allocated to support the university's athletic programs.

UCF has over 400 registered student organizations, intramural sports, and an active Student Government. The university encourages student activism through organizations such as the Office of Student Involvement, the Multicultural Student Center, the Campus Activities Board, and Volunteer UCF.

=== Traditions ===
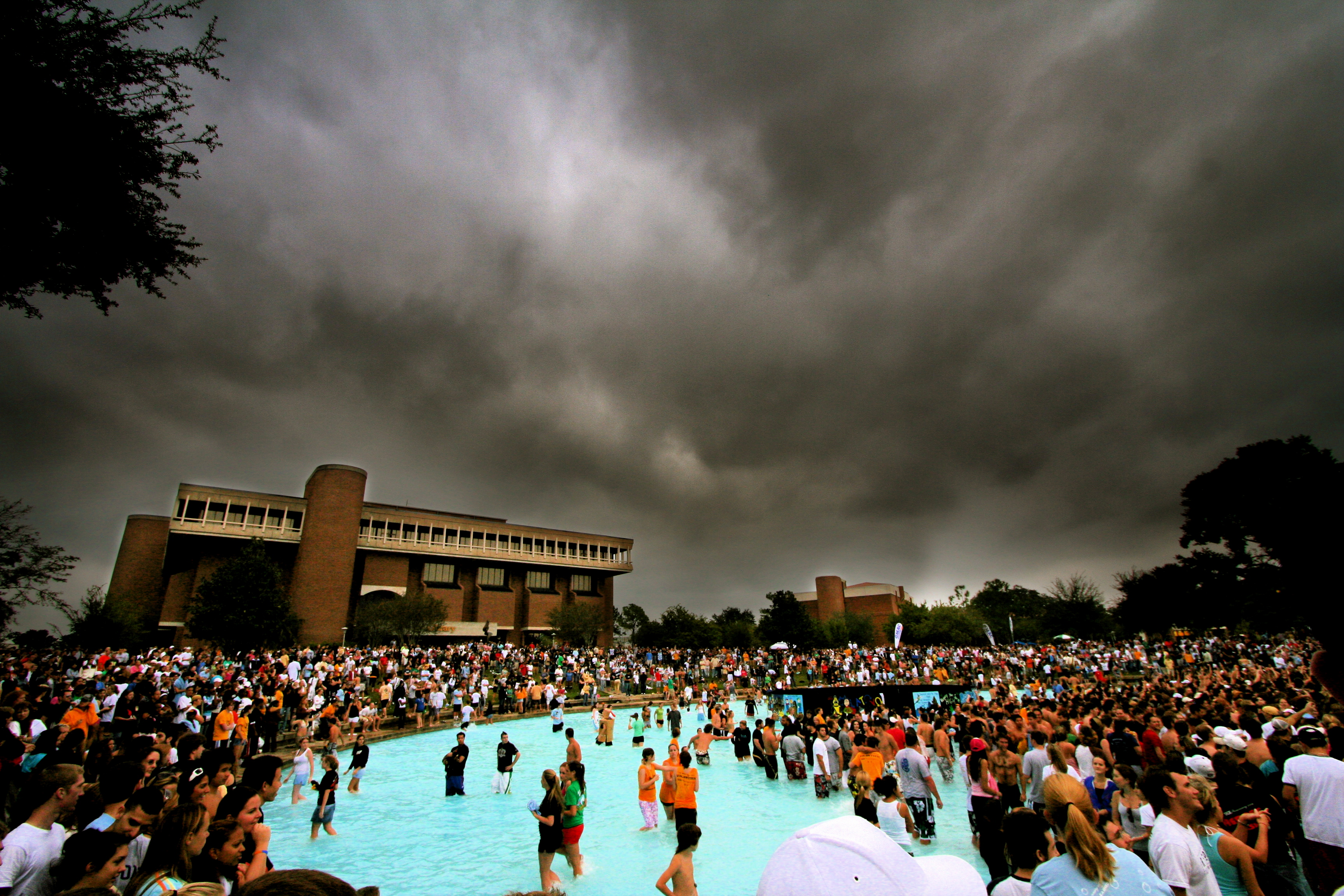
Students in the Reflecting Pond during Spirit Splash

Spirit Splash is a homecoming tradition at UCF, and is traditionally the only time during the year that students are allowed into the Reflecting Pond. It has been named the best college tradition in Florida by Florida Leader magazine, and among "The 20 Best College Traditions" by Business Insider.

Spirit Splash occurs the Friday before the Homecoming game, and serves as a pep rally where students descend into the pond to demonstrate school spirit. Spirit Splash began in 1995 when then-Student Body President Miguel Torregrossa was pushed into the Reflecting Pond by one of his cabinet members and fellow students followed suit. Along with the thousands of students who attend, there are members of the community, local dignitaries, alumni, children and even dogs who come to join in on the festivities. Knightro, the Marching Knights, cheerleaders, student athletes, and dancers all participate in the pep rally, usually followed by a concert. Spirit Splash was made possible in part by weight testing performed on the Reflecting Pond in preparation for President Richard Nixon's visit to the university to speak at its 1973 commencement. It was determined that the best way to protect the president would be to hold commencement in the pond itself, after being drained, so that Secret Service agents could be stationed on the roofs of the adjacent buildings.

As is the case with many universities, UCF has superstitions regarding its seal. From their first day on campus for orientation, new students are told to never walk on the Pegasus seal in the center of the main floor of the Student Union. As the tradition is told, those who step on the seal will never graduate from UCF. Usually the seal is roped off with heavy black velvet ropes, but when the ropes are not in place, students can be seen carefully avoiding the seal. In 2005, Florida Leader magazine named this tradition the best college superstition in Florida.

=== Housing ===
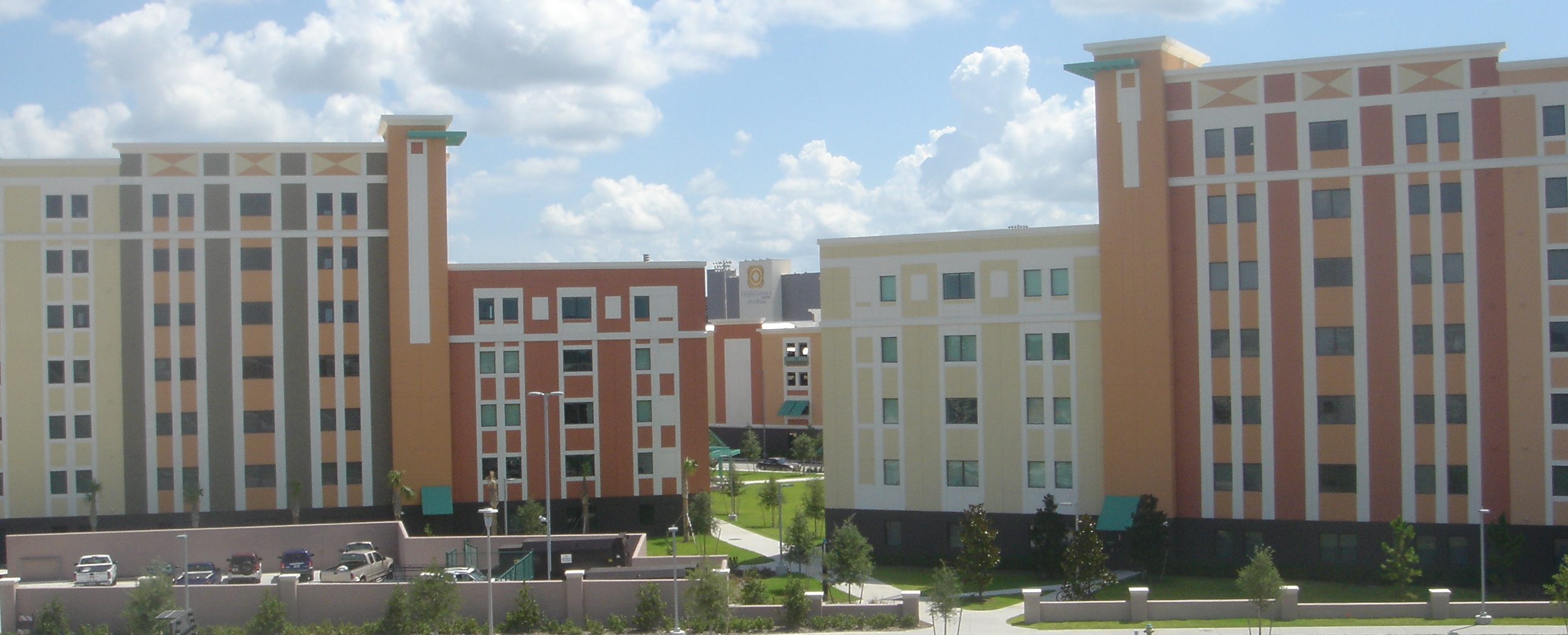
Towers at Knights Plaza

The university currently houses over 12,000 on-campus students in eight different communities. Residence hall style suites are available in the Libra, Apollo, Hercules, Nike, and Neptune communities. All of the residence hall suites have bathrooms shared between 2 or 3 rooms as opposed to communal bathrooms. Apartment-style housing is available in the Academic Village (Nike and Hercules) communities, the Towers at Knights Plaza, the Lake Claire Courtyard Apartments Community, and NorthView. UCF also has 400 beds at the Rosen College Apartments Community, located on the Rosen College of Hospitality Management campus. The majority of all on campus housing is occupied by freshman, though The Towers at Knights Plaza house mainly upper-classmen, student athletes, and honors students. Residents of the Towers Communities and Rosen College Apartments sign annual contracts to rent their apartments for a full academic year (fall, spring, and summer), whereas residents of all other standard housing communities on the main campus sign academic contracts to rent their rooms only for one or two semesters at a time. Housing on the main campus typically fills to capacity well before the start of the fall semester, and cannot accommodate everyone who applies.

In addition, about 3,750 beds are available at the university-affiliated housing communities of Knights Circle and The Pointe at Central, which are off-campus apartment communities owned by The University of Central Florida Foundation, Inc. and managed by Asset Living. These communities contain many UCF services such as Resident Assistants, UCF Police service, reduced rent and offer shuttle service to and from campus on class days. The university also administers NorthView, which is owned and operated by UCF and located directly north of the main campus in Oviedo. NorthView houses 600 students, and includes a Hillel Jewish Student Center, a Catholic Student Center, and a common space for other faith based organizations to use.

Greek housing is also available on the main campus in the Greek Park community, which consists of close to 500 beds. There are ten sororities and three fraternities housed on campus, with eleven fraternities offering housing off campus.

=== LEAD Scholars Academy ===
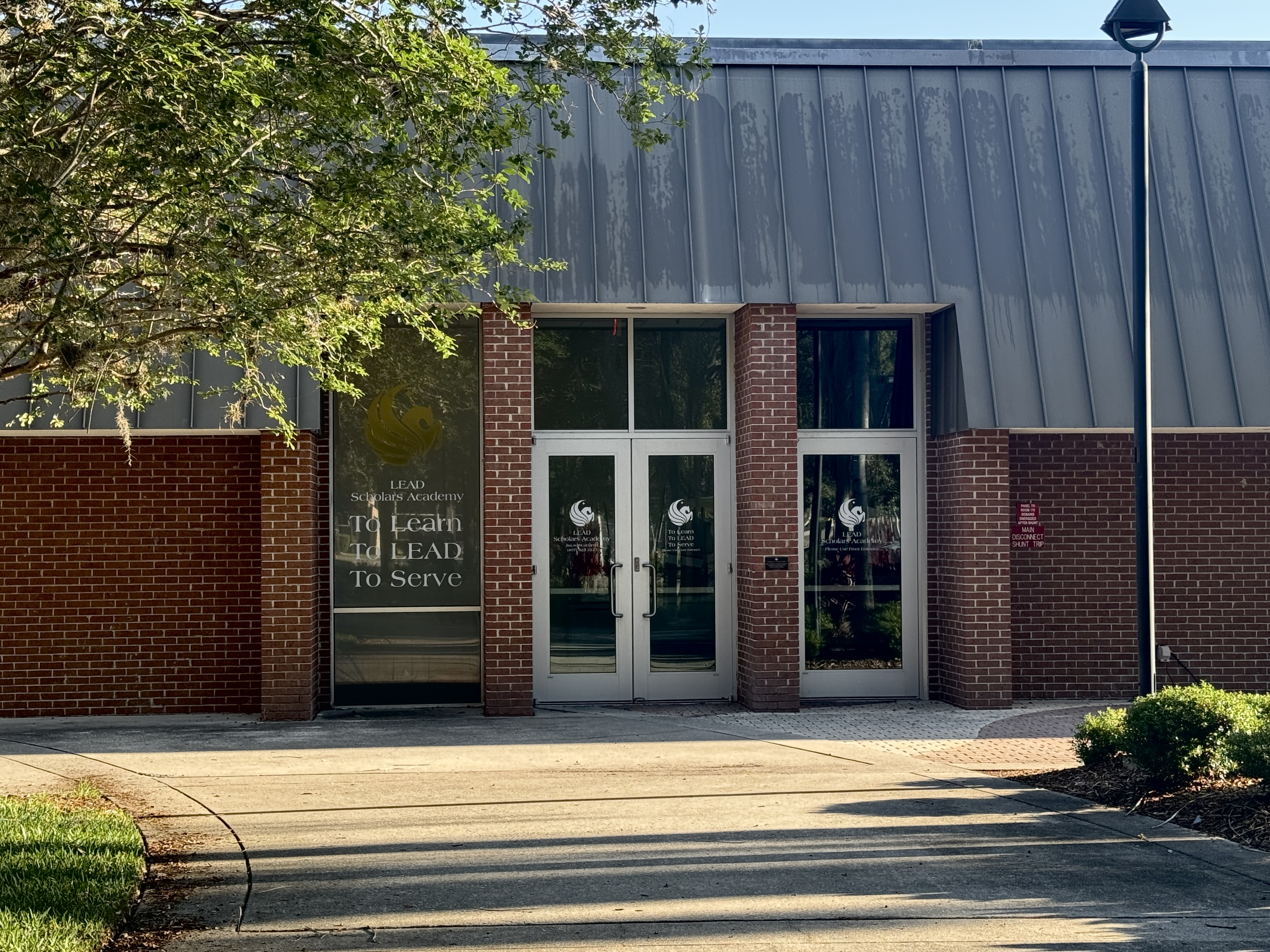
LEAD Lounge

Founded in 1995 and eliminated on August 3, 2026, the LEAD Scholars Academy was a selective, two-year undergraduate leadership program at the University of Central Florida that combined academic coursework, experiential learning, and service projects. In the first year students completed LDR 2001 (Foundations of Leadership) and LDR 2002 (Leadership in Action); in the second year they enrolled in LDR 3950 (LEAD Seminar) and LDR 4105 (Leadership Capstone).

Applicants typically participated in signature events such as a two-day REEL Retreat, annual Leadership Week panels and workshops. Graduates had the option to continue their leadership studies to receive a Leadership Studies minor or certificate and contributed collectively thousands of community service hours each year through partnerships with local nonprofits and campus organizations.

In 2019, the LEAD Scholars Academy was named “Outstanding Leadership Program of the Year” by the NASPA Student Leadership Programs Knowledge Community; in 2023, it received the “Outstanding Program Bridging Civic Learning and Leadership Development” award from the NASPA Civic Learning & Democratic Engagement Knowledge Community; and in 2023–24 the program earned a NASPA Excellence Bronze Award in the Leadership, Student Activities, & Related Areas category, recognizing its innovative student development initiatives.

The LEAD Scholars Academy was cited as a model leadership pipeline by Inside Higher Ed, noted by Georgetown’s The Feed for its role in improving Latine student retention through targeted support programs, and featured on the NASPA SA Voices podcast in an interview with Stacey Malaret discussing the program’s impact and methodology.

=== Recreation and fitness ===
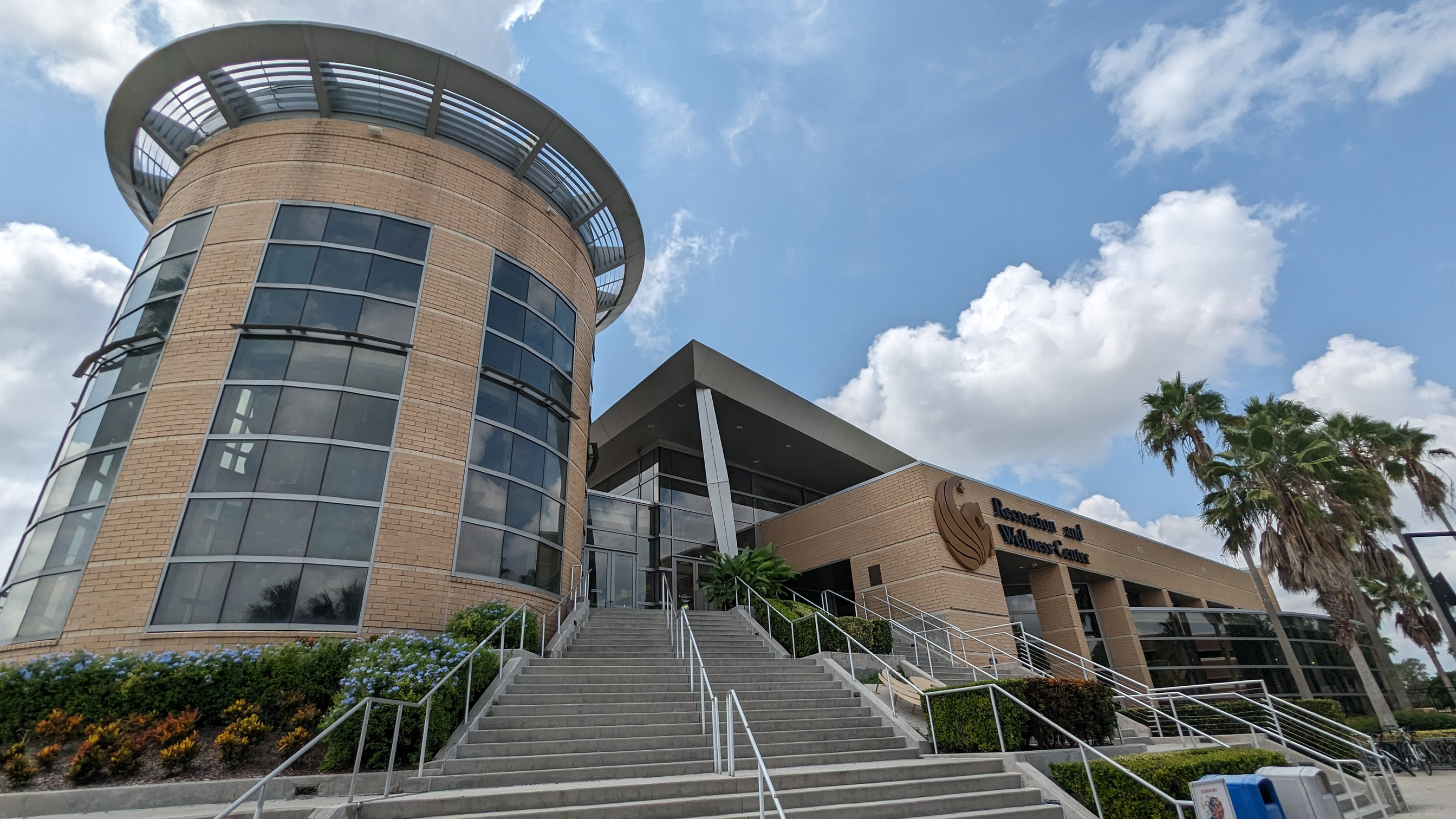
Recreation and Wellness Center

Many different recreational organizations and facilities are available on the UCF campus. Lake Claire is an on-campus lake with canoes, kayaks, and pedal boats available for rent (free to UCF students), and a small beachfront. In addition, UCF's Challenge Course is one of only five in the country to contain a high elements course.

UCF's main campus boasts the Recreation and Wellness Center and is located on the south side of campus, adjacent to the Academic Village. The center is open to all students, and paid memberships are available for non-students. The Wellness Center offer programs to boost students' understanding of their health, provides discounted blood and STD testing, staffs certified personal trainers, and teaches methods to maintain good health.

The UCF Recreation and Wellness Center, which opened in 2002, is a 150,000 square feet (14,000 m^{2}) building that comprises five programs: Intramural Sports, Sport Clubs, Outdoor Adventure, Fitness, and Aquatics. The main recreation center includes a custom climbing wall with more than 20 different routes, as well as, tennis courts, sand volleyball courts, a disc golf course, numerous intramural sports fields, a leisure pool, and an outdoor lap pool.

=== Student government ===
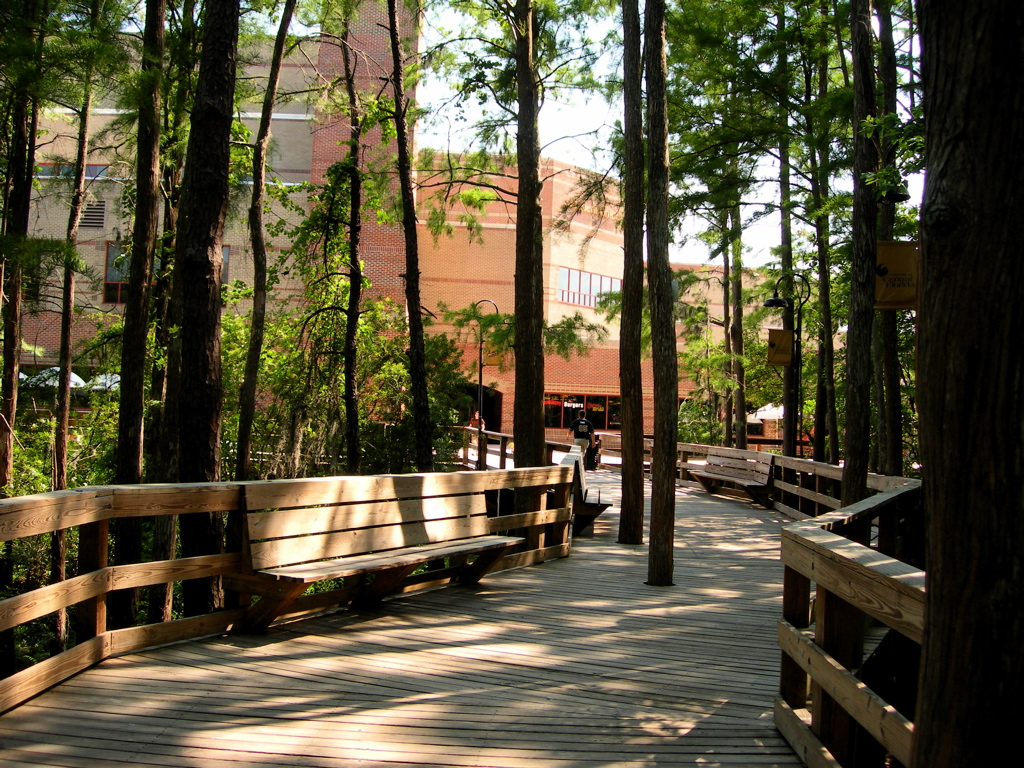
Boardwalk behind UCF Student Union

The University of Central Florida's Student Government (UCF SG) is an advocacy group for the students who attend the university, representing the university's approximately 70,000 undergraduate, graduate, and professional students. It is the largest student government within the state of Florida and one of the largest in the United States. UCF SG operates within a multimillion-dollar budget. It funds and operates five campus departments—the Recreation and Wellness Center, the Office of Student Involvement, Student Legal Services, the A&SF Business Office, and the Student Union—while also providing around $1 million in funding to nearly 600 registered student organizations.

=== Campus and area transportation ===
The university campus is served by The Pegasus Express which serves the 11 shuttle routes on-campus. The Central Florida Research Park, Rosen College of Hospitality, Health sciences campus, and the Downtown city campus are all served by the regional campus shuttles, which has 15 routes and covers 22 off-campus UCF apartment complexes as well.

=== Media ===
KnightNews.com is the only digital student newspaper serving the UCF community, and it operates without oversight from the university administration. KnightNews.com won the College Press Freedom Award in 2016 for its work fighting for open government. A print newspaper, the Central Florida Future, was shut down in August 2016. The Future, which also ran without university oversight, was one of the largest student-run newspapers in the United States. It focused on campus and local news coverage, but also featured national and international stories. The university itself publishes two magazines, Centric and Pegasus. Centric is the official student magazine of the university, and Pegasus is the official university magazine.

The university has operated WUCF-FM, a NPR station, since 1978. The station broadcasts Jazz that reaches Orange, Seminole, Osceola, Brevard, Lake and Volusia counties in central Florida. They broadcast an Internet program that is heard worldwide. In 2011, the university purchased WUCF-TV, which is Central Florida's only Public Broadcasting Service (PBS) television station. As the region's sole PBS affiliate, the station broadcasts to an estimated population of 4.6 million people in its aerial viewing area.

One limited access program at UCF is the Jazz Studies program, which launched a professional recording label for the university, Flying Horse Records. The program's faculty group, The Jazz Professors, and their student group, The Flying Horse Big Band, have both issued professional recordings since 2011 for the university label.

=== Greek life ===
The Office of Fraternity and Sorority Life at The University of Central Florida is separated into five divisions: UCF Greek Council, Interfraternity Council, National Pan-Hellenic Council, Panhellenic Council, and the Diversified Greek Council. The Order of Omega has a chapter at the university.

The Interfraternity Council (IFC) comprises 18 fraternities, and the Panhellenic Council is made up of 12 sororities. In addition there are also many multicultural and honor Greek organizations. The Diversified Greek Council consists of 9 cultural organizations, four fraternities and five sororities. The National Pan-Hellenic Council comprises nine historically black organizations, five fraternities and four sororities. There are now also three recognized fraternal organizations for Christian students.

Greek life at the University of Central Florida involves more than 3,000 students in over 45 chapters. Approximately 11% of current undergraduate males and 9% of undergraduate females are members of either a sorority or fraternity.

The average GPA of Greek Life is higher than the overall university average. UCF's Greek Life won the inaugural Mid-American Conference Grade Point Average Award, which is given to the university with the highest Greek GPA above their campus' non-Greek GPA.

== Athletics ==
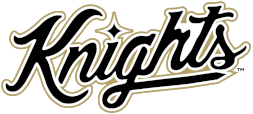
UCF Knights athletic script wordmark

The University of Central Florida features a large variety of intercollegiate athletics teams, known as the "UCF Knights", which compete in Division I of the National Collegiate Athletic Association (NCAA), and the Big 12 Conference (except for the men's soccer team which competes in the Sun Belt Conference). (Note: In football, UCF competes in the NCAA NCAA Division I Football Bowl Subdivision (FBS), still often referred to by its former designation of "Division I-A.")

UCF fields 15 varsity teams: six men's, and nine women's. Men's sports include baseball, basketball, football, golf, soccer, and tennis. Women's sports include basketball, cross country, golf, rowing, soccer, softball, tennis, track and field, and volleyball.

Big 12 Conference logo in UCF colors

The Knights varsity teams have won numerous conference titles, and two national titles. UCF, as members of Conference USA between 2005 and 2013, were conference champions in football in 2007 and 2010, and women's basketball in 2009 and 2010. After joining American Conference (AAC) in 2013, the Knights won additional football conference championships in 2013, 2014, 2017, and 2018. The Knights' claim a national championship in 2017, when they were named national champions in football by the Colley Matrix. They finished the 2017 season as the only unbeaten team in the country but did not play in the College Football Playoff. While every other major selector named Alabama the national champion, the NCAA lists UCF as a co-national champion in its official records book due to the Colley Matrix ranking them No. 1.

The women's volleyball team won the AIAW Small College Division national championship in 1978 (at the time the women's sports equivalent of NCAA Division II; the NCAA did not sanction women's sports until the 1980s), and the men's basketball team reached the Division II Elite Eight the same year.

The UCF varsity athletic program began in the 1969–70 academic year. Its first athletic brand was the Citronaut, an orange-astronaut hybrid. Students later chose the "Knights of Pegasus", and the Citronaut remains a legacy mark used for alternate branding. Then known as the Florida Technological University Knights of Pegasus, the university was a charter member of the Sunshine State Conference in 1975.

The Knights joined Conference USA in 2005 and opened a new athletic village, Knights Plaza, in 2007. Marketed as "Bringing the Knights home," the complex includes Addition Financial Arena, Acrisure Bounce House, a softball stadium, and the first Division I indoor football practice facility in Florida. UCF was the first school to open a new football stadium and basketball arena in the same year. Knights Plaza also includes John Euliano Park, the UCF Soccer and Track Stadium, and practice facilities. New athletic logos and an updated Knightro mascot debuted with the complex.

=== Spirit teams ===
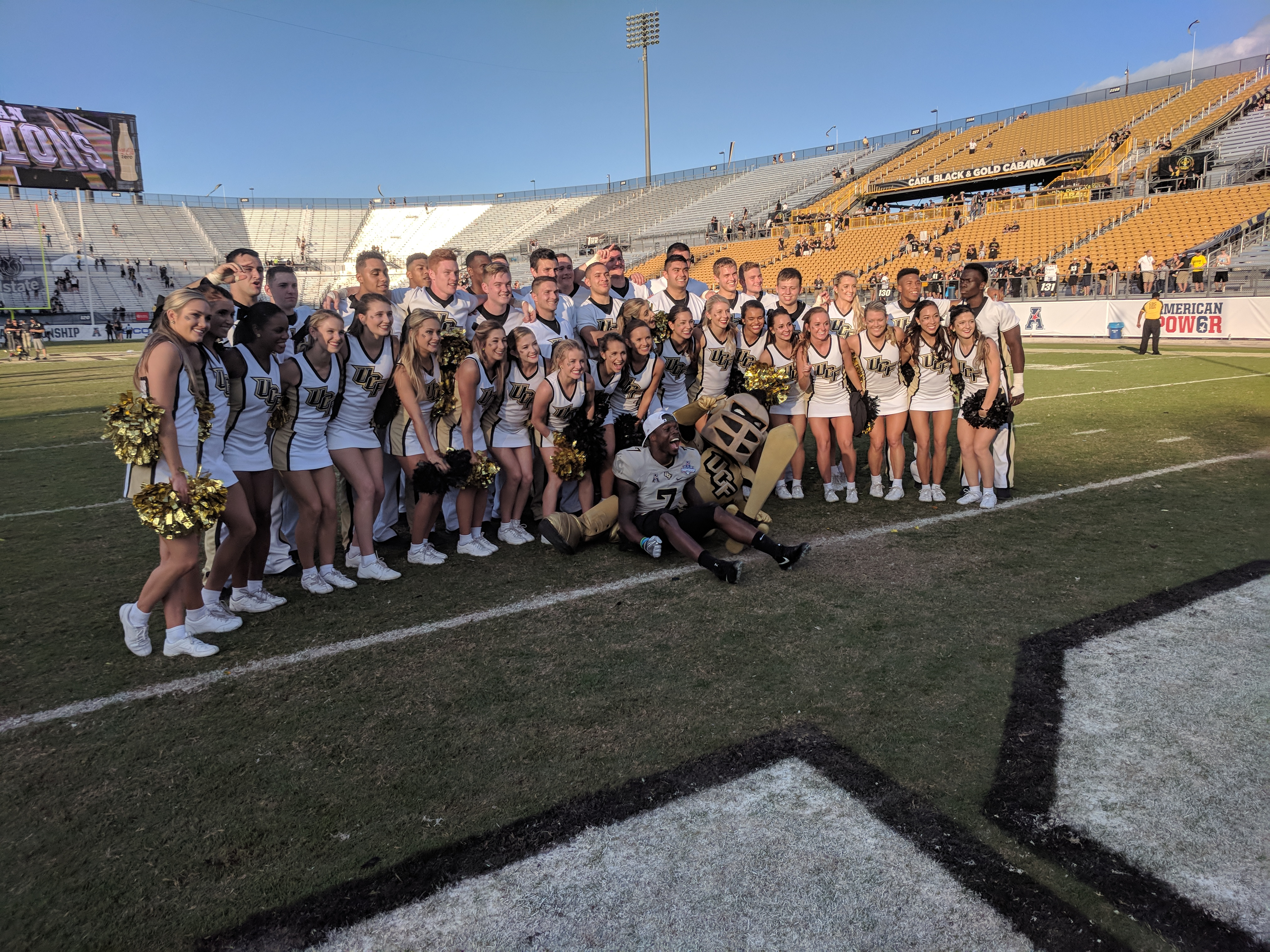
UCF cheerleaders with Knightro mascot

The UCF cheerleading team, which is a competitive team, has also captured national titles. They have won four at the College Cheerleading and Dance Team Nationals, in 2003, 2007, 2020 and 2024. As the reigning national champions, the cheerleading team was followed by WE tv's cheerleading show, Cheerleader U, in 2008.

The UCF dance team, known as KnightMoves, competes at the College Cheerleading and Dance Team National Championship. KnightMoves has finished in the top-10 of nationals every year since 2003. The team also placed third in 2025 and Top 5: 2003, 2004, 2024 and 2026.

=== Knights football ===
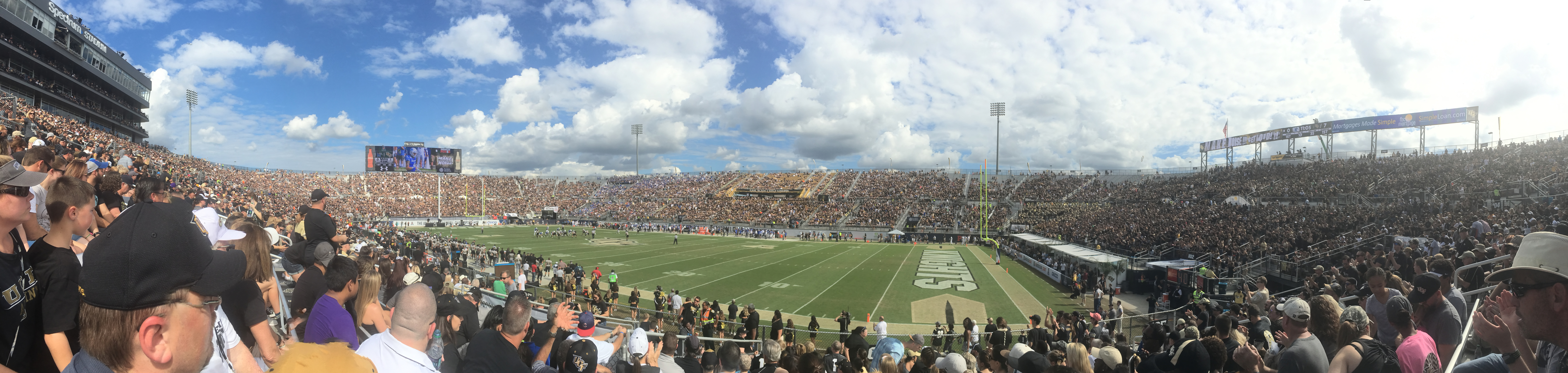
UCF football stadium known as "The Bounce House"

The Knights football program began in 1979. UCF competed in the playoffs three times before ascending to the FBS level in 1996. The Knights have won six conference championships and six division titles. In UCF's first year in CUSA, the team experienced the fourth-best turnaround in NCAA history by winning the conference's eastern division and earning its first bowl berth in the 4th Annual Hawai'i Bowl. Celebrating their inaugural year in their new on-campus stadium, the 2007 UCF Football team won the CUSA Championship for the first time in the school's history and the eastern division for the second time in three seasons, securing a berth to the school's second bowl game, the 49th Annual AutoZone Liberty Bowl. During the 2010 season, for the first time in school history, the Knights garnered national rankings, finishing the season with a top–20 ranking. The Knights won the 2010 CUSA Championship game, securing a berth to the AutoZone Liberty Bowl in which the team earned their first-ever bowl victory, a 10–6 win over Georgia. In 2013, the Knights joined the American Conference (AAC) as a full member, won the conference's inaugural football championship, and upset the sixth-ranked Big 12 Conference champion Baylor Bears in the 2014 Fiesta Bowl. In 2017, the Knights finished with the only undefeated season in the FBS after a third AAC Championship win and a victory over Auburn Tigers in the 2018 Peach Bowl.

=== Knights basketball ===
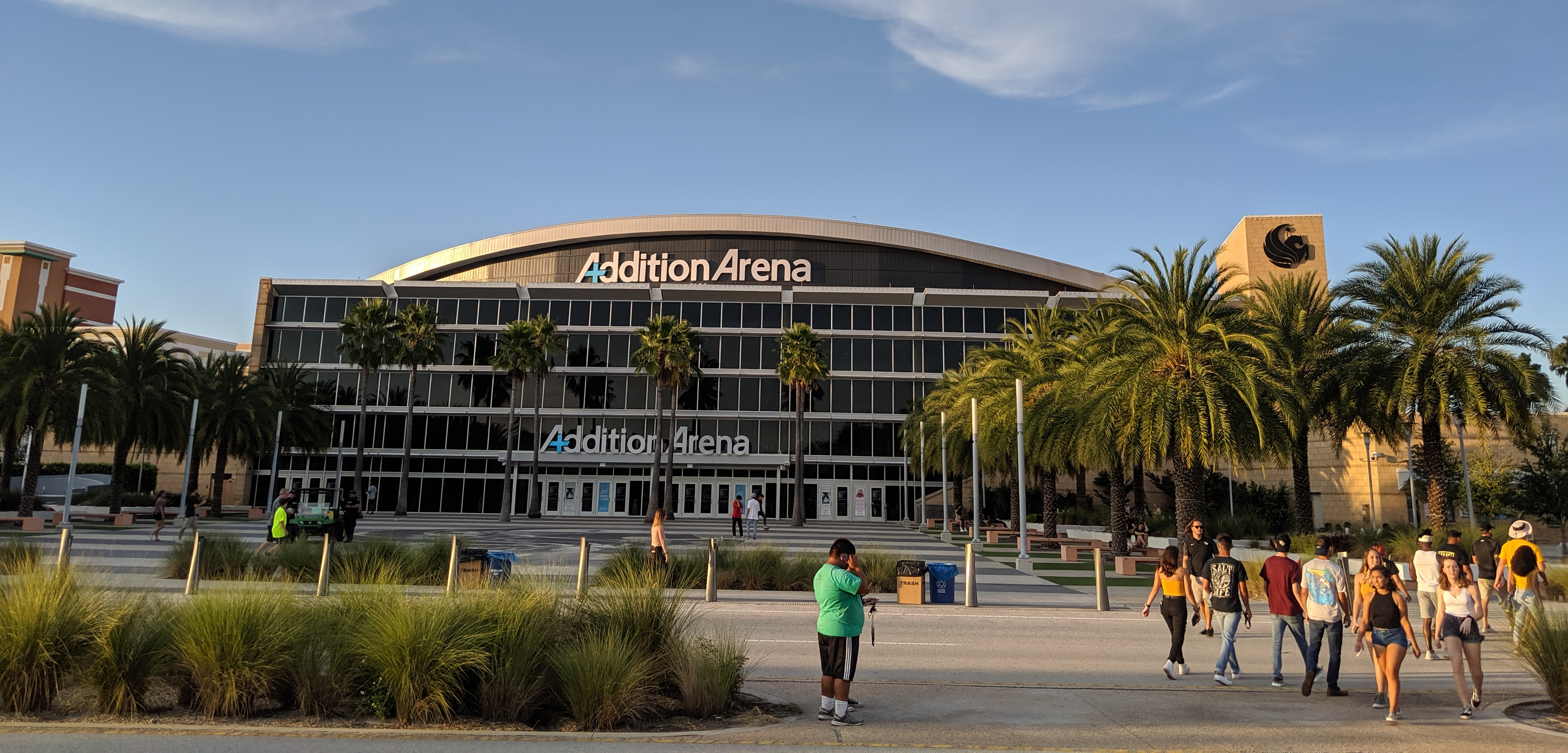
Addition Financial Arena, home of UCF basketball

The UCF men's basketball team began in 1969 under head coach Torchy Clark. The Knights have reached the NCAA Division I tournament six times (1994, 1996, 2004, 2005, 2019, 2026) and made the Division II Final Four in 1978. The program has won seven conference regular-season championships and five conference tournament titles. After a 10–0 start in 2010–11, UCF earned its first national ranking. Under Johnny Dawkins, the Knights reached the 2017 NIT semifinals, took No. 1 seed Duke to the final possession in the 2019 NCAA tournament, finished as runner-up in the 2025 College Basketball Crown, and returned to the 2026 NCAA tournament.

The women's basketball team has won five conference regular-season titles and five conference tournament titles, including Conference USA tournament championships in 2009 and 2011 and the 2022 AAC regular-season and tournament titles.

=== Knights baseball and softball ===
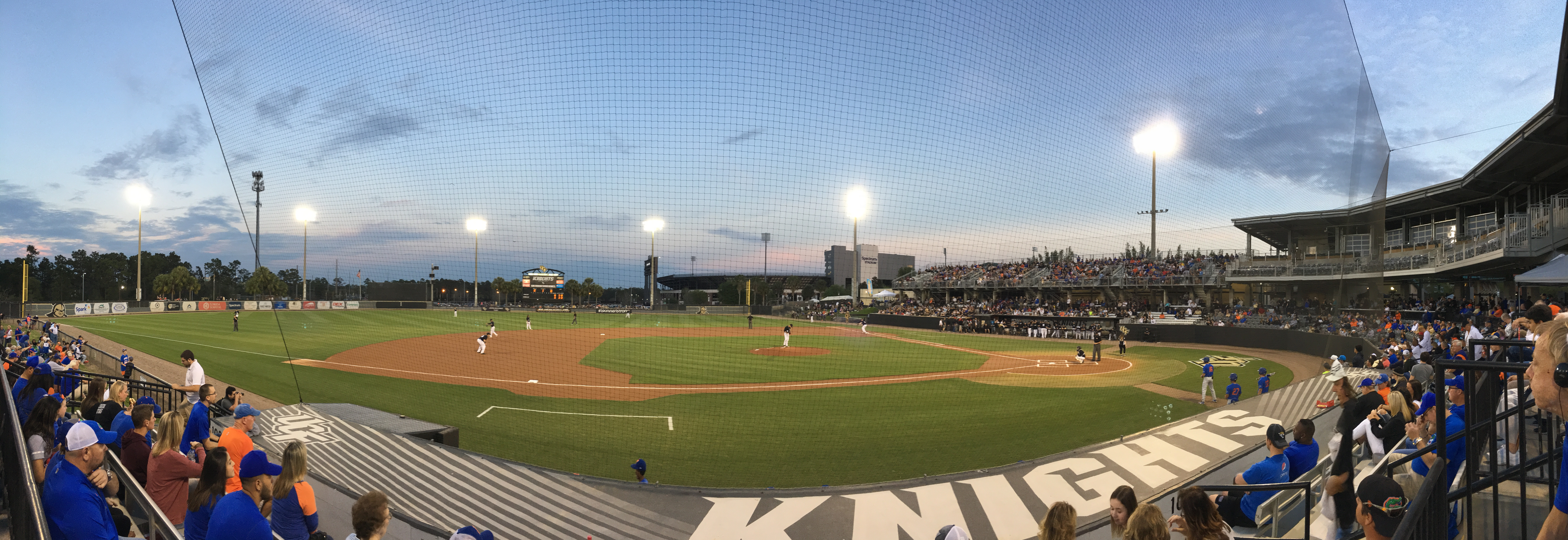
John Euliano Park, home of the baseball team

The Knights baseball team plays at John Euliano Park. Baseball has made 14 NCAA tournament appearances, most recently in 2026.

The softball team plays at the UCF Softball Complex and has five conference tournament titles, three regular-season titles, and a 2026 NCAA Super Regional berth.

=== Knights soccer ===
The Knights soccer programs play at the UCF Soccer and Track Stadium. The men's team competes in the Sun Belt Conference and has won eight conference championships, five of them tournament titles, including the 2025 Sun Belt championship, and has made 10 NCAA tournament appearances. The women's team has 10 conference tournament titles, 13 regular-season titles, 23 NCAA Division I tournament appearances, and a runner-up finish in the 1982 national championship game.

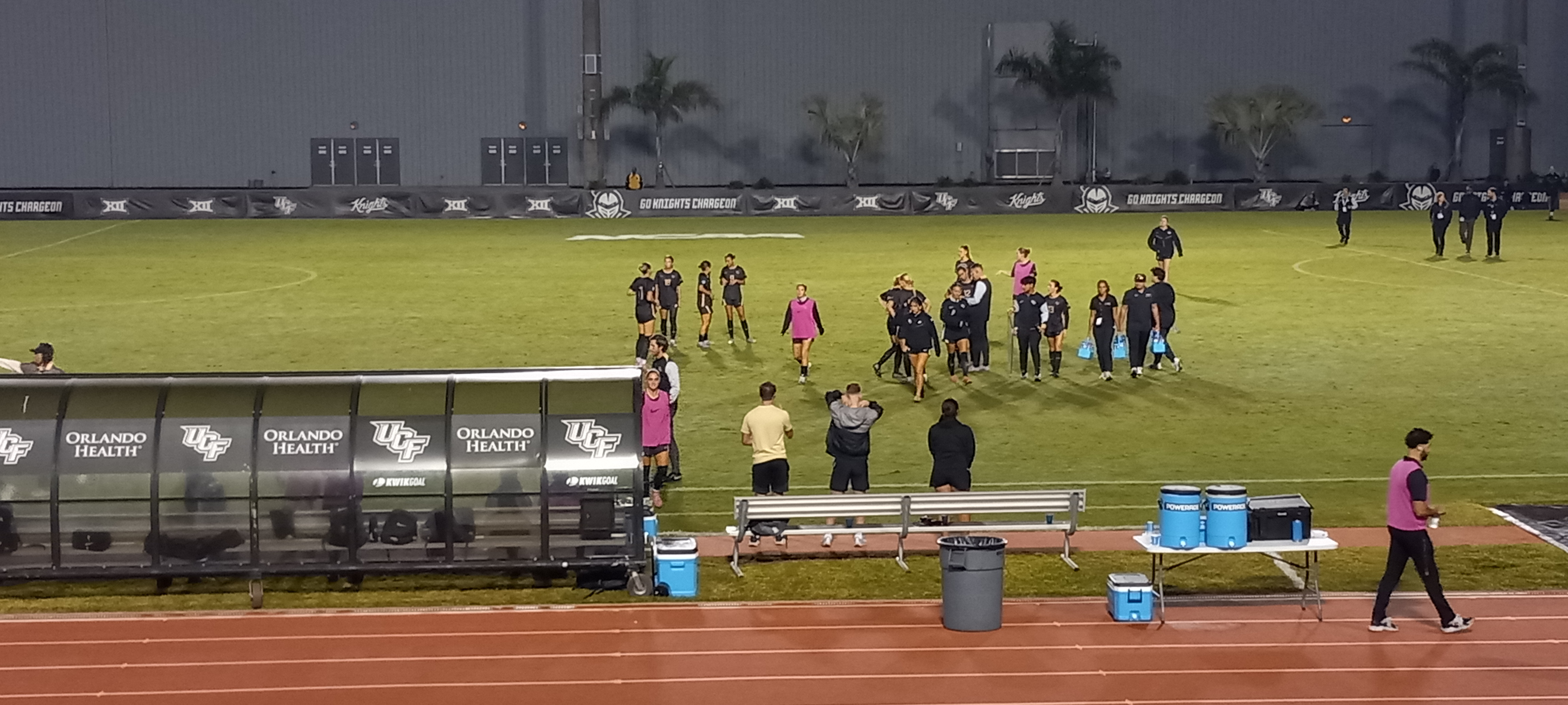
UCF Soccer and Track Complex

=== Knights track and field ===
The Knights track and field teams compete at the UCF Soccer and Track Stadium. The women's program has won multiple indoor and outdoor conference championships and regularly qualifies for the NCAA Championships, including indoor and outdoor nationals in 2025–26. Aurieyall Scott won the 2013 NCAA indoor 60-meter title. Afia Charles became the program's first Olympian when she ran the 400 meters for Antigua and Barbuda at the 2012 Summer Olympics.

== Notable alumni ==
As of 2025, the University of Central Florida has over 380,000 alumni living in every U.S. state and more than 150 countries. UCF alumni include two NASA astronauts, a former United States assistant secretary of state, prime minister of Libya, a chairman of the Council of Economic Advisers, a director of the National Reconnaissance Office, and a director of the U.S. Secret Service, as well as numerous members of the Florida Cabinet and Florida Legislature, NASA leaders, high-ranking military officers, and executives at Fortune 500 companies such as Google, Boeing, Darden Restaurants, Lockheed Martin, Disney, and Yahoo.

Notable UCF alumni and affiliates include:

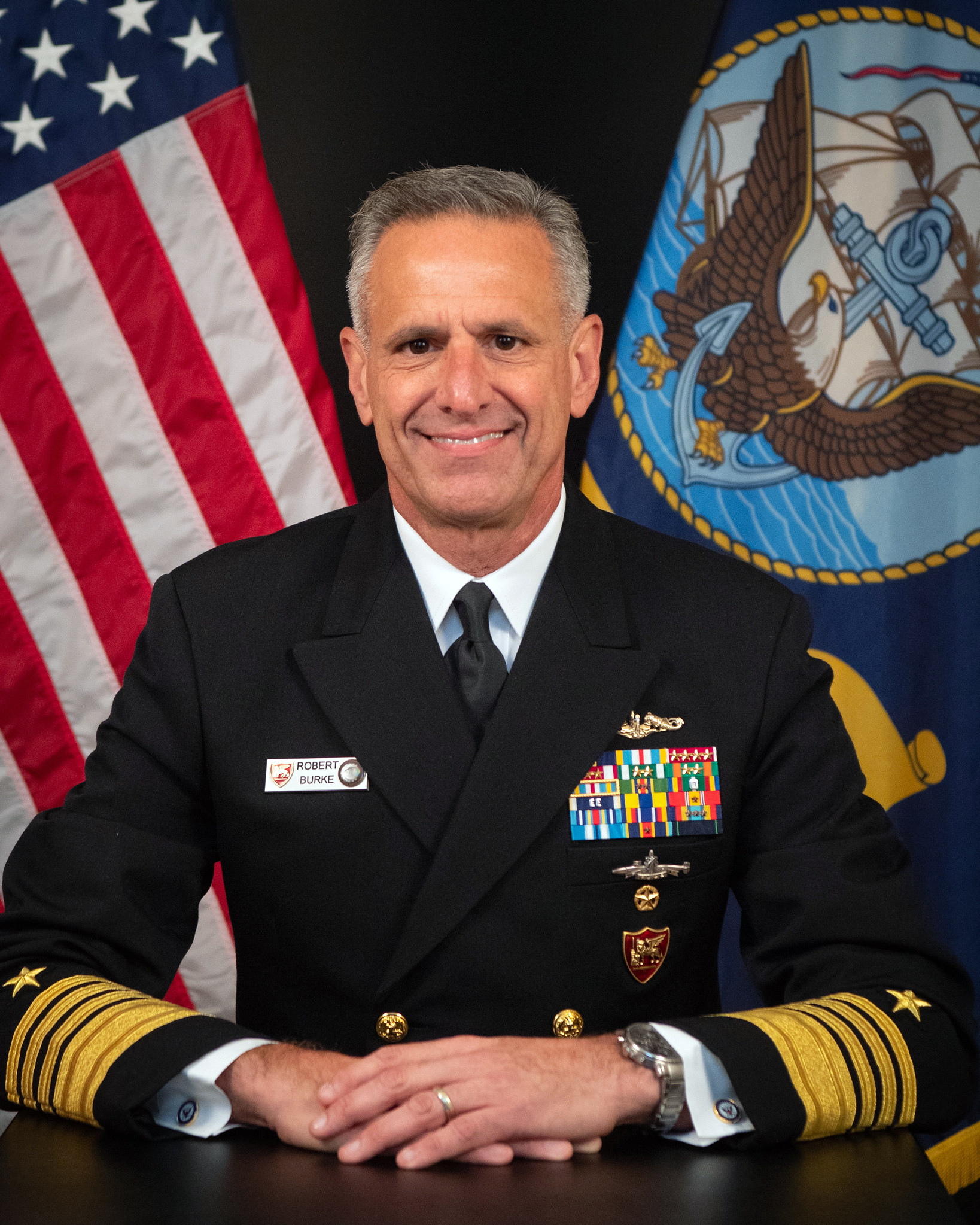
Robert P. Burke
Former U.S. Navy four-star admiral
58th chief of Naval Personnel

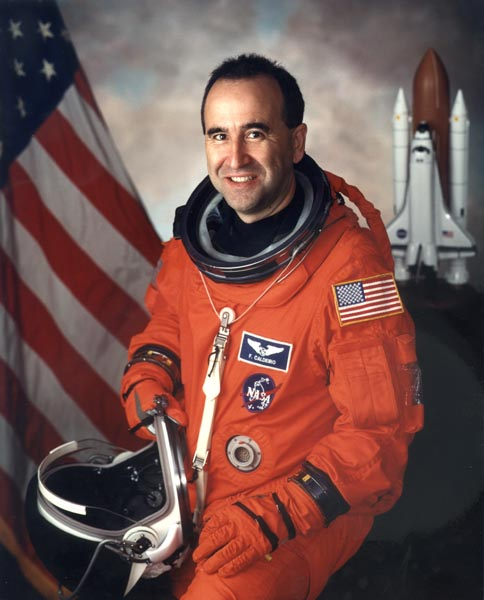
Fernando Caldeiro
NASA astronaut

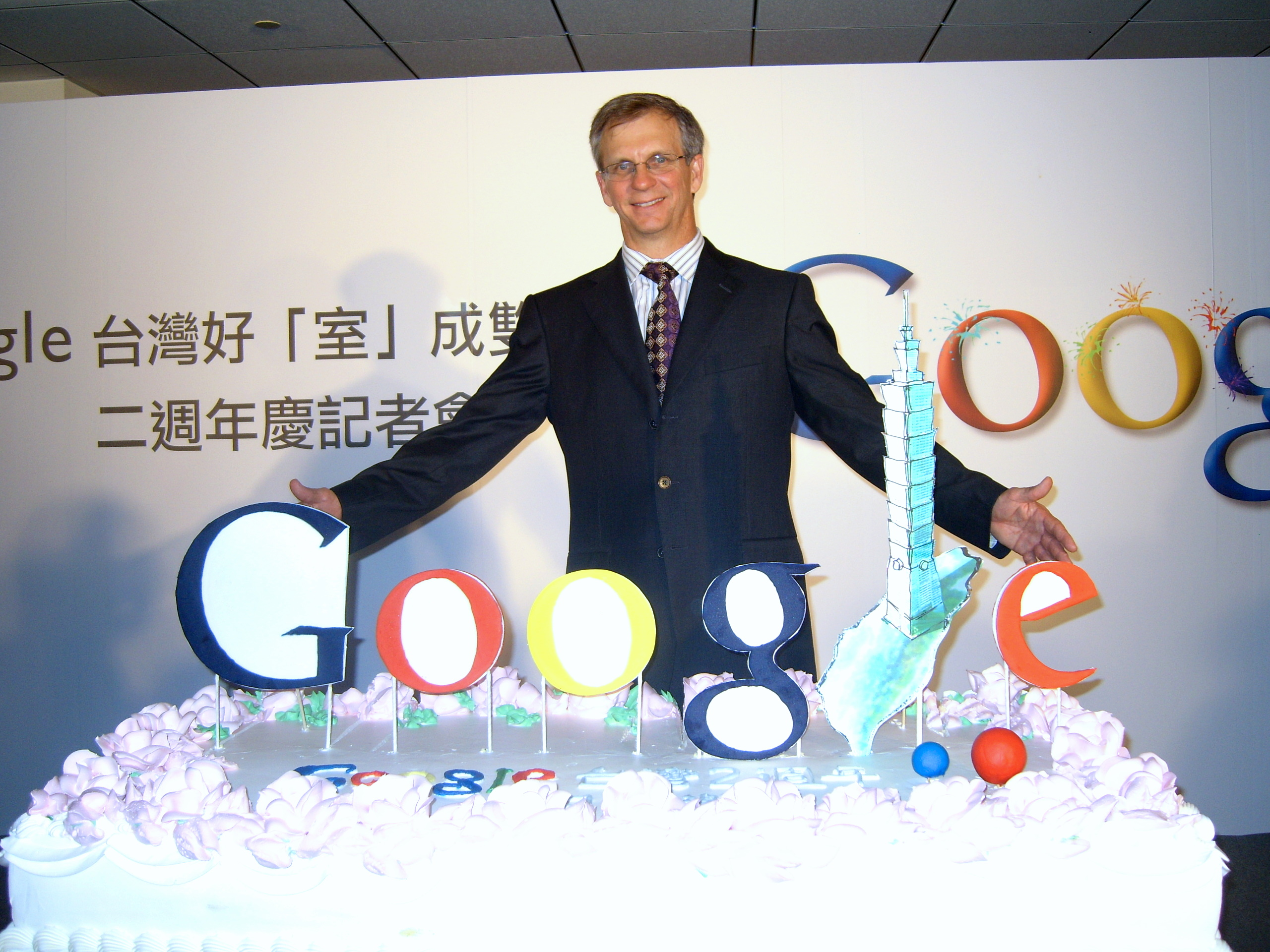
Alan Eustace
Former Google vice president
World-record space dive

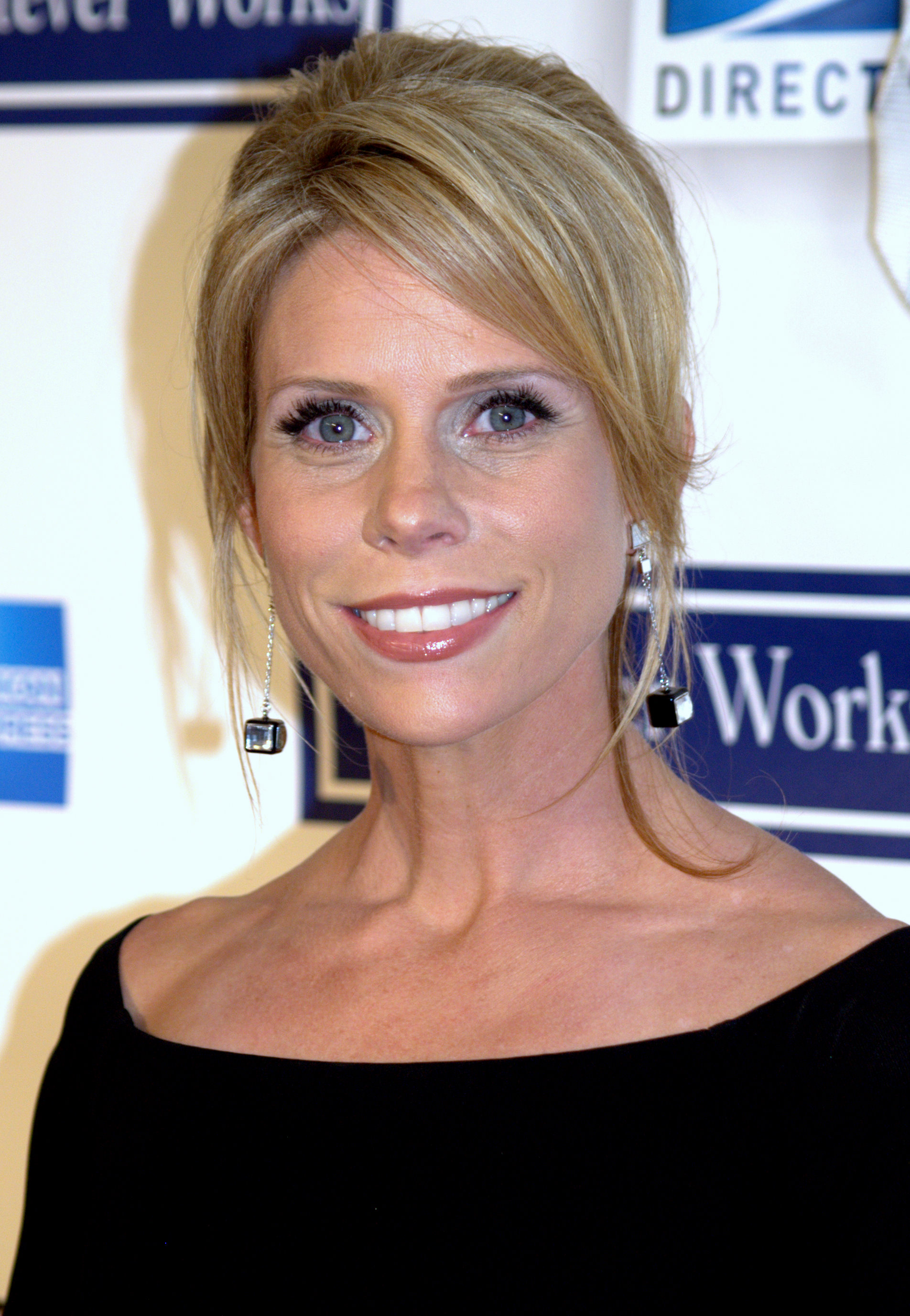
Cheryl Hines
Emmy award-nominated actress

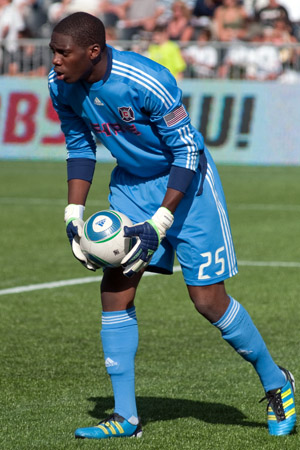
Sean Johnson
U.S. national team & MLS goalkeeper

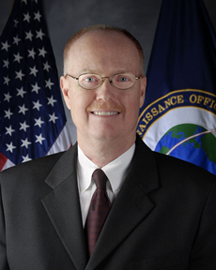
Scott F. Large
Former director of National Reconnaissance Office

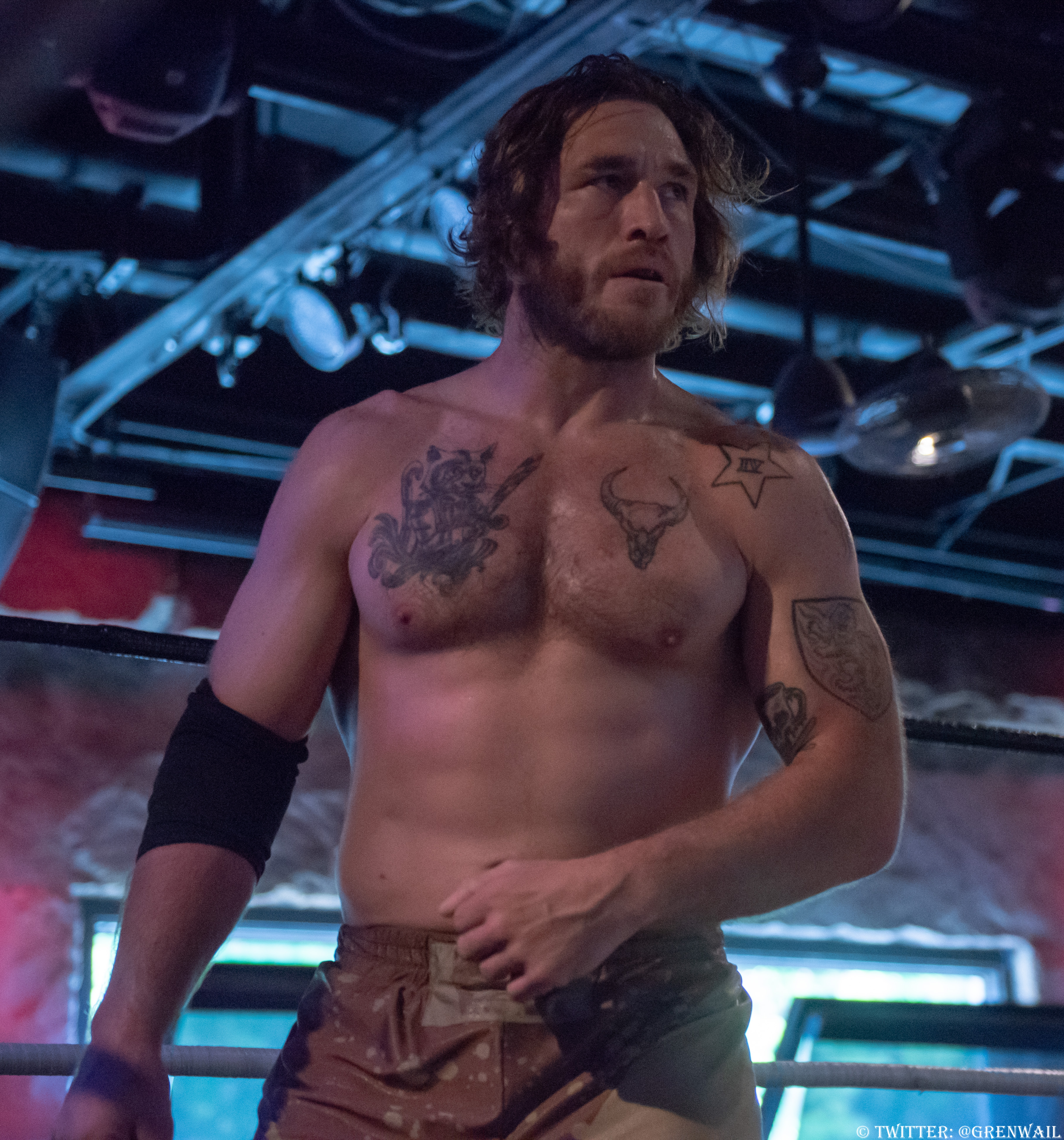
Tom Lawlor
Professional wrestler & former UFC fighter
MLW World Heavyweight Champion

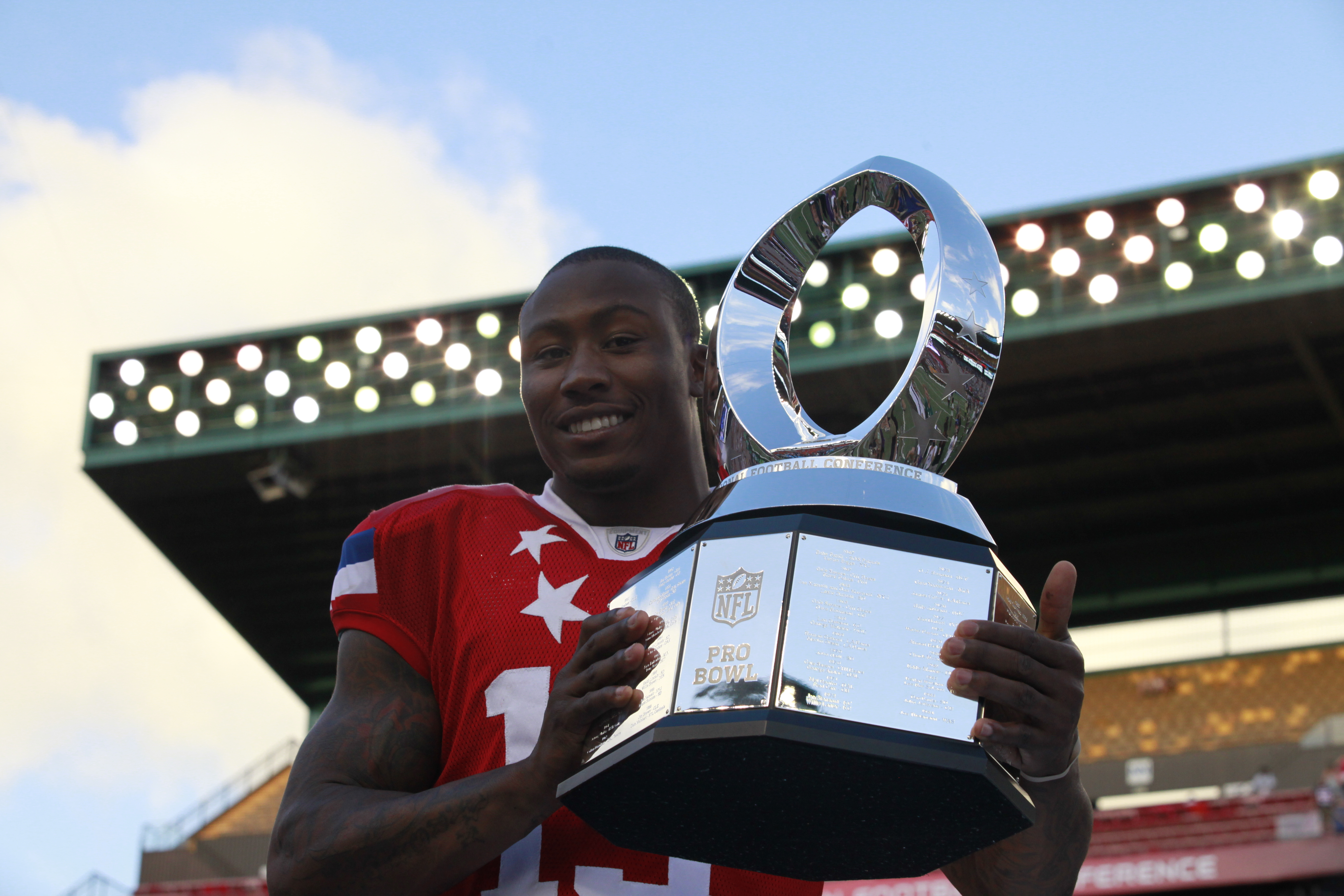
Brandon Marshall
Former NFL wide receiver
26th all-time in receiving yards

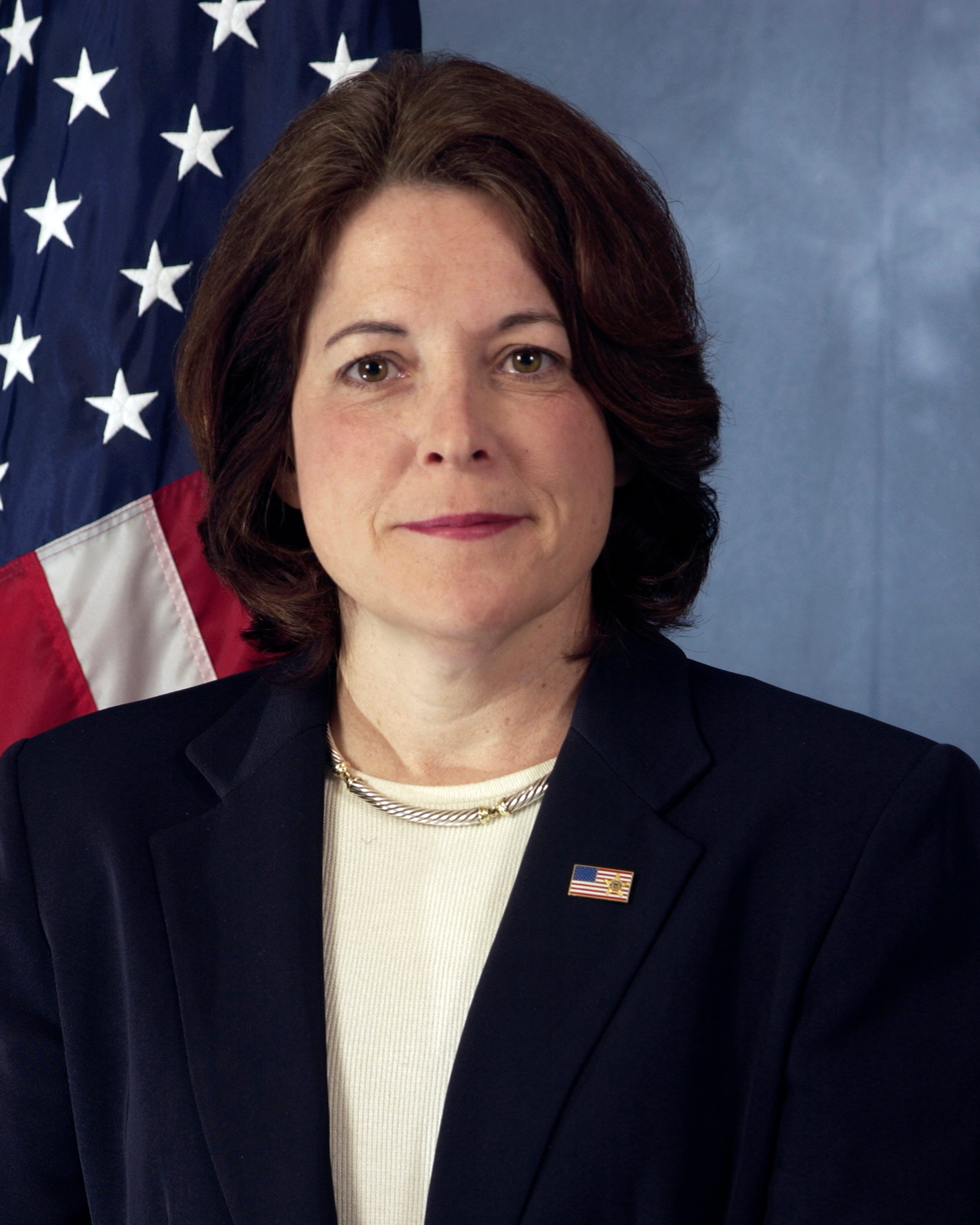
Julia Pierson
First female director of the
United States Secret Service

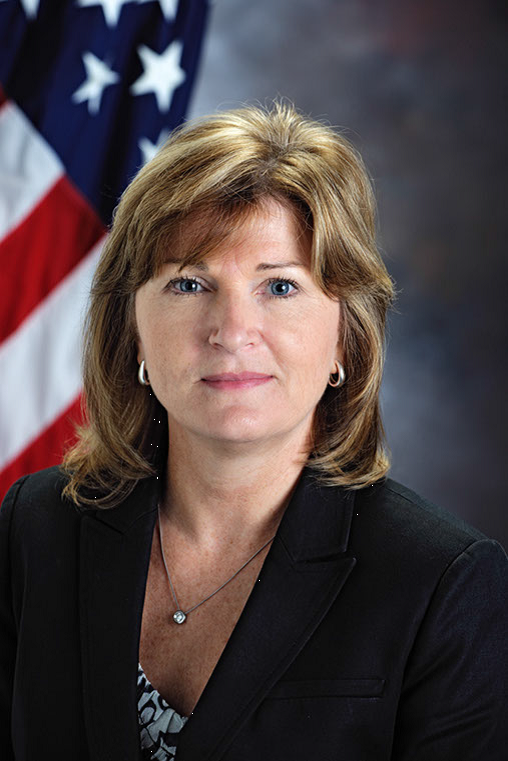
Lesa Roe
Former NASA deputy administrator

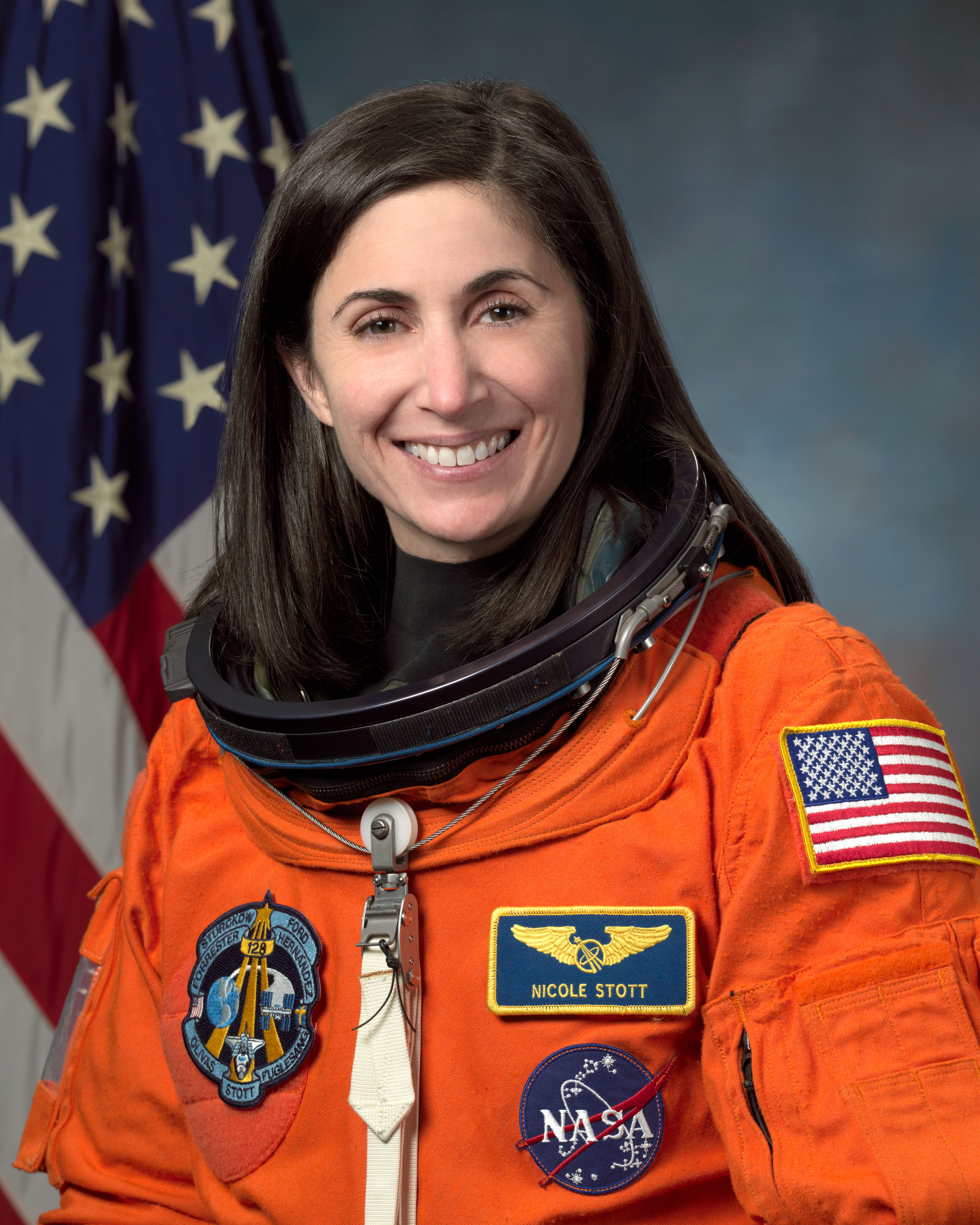
Nicole Stott
NASA astronaut

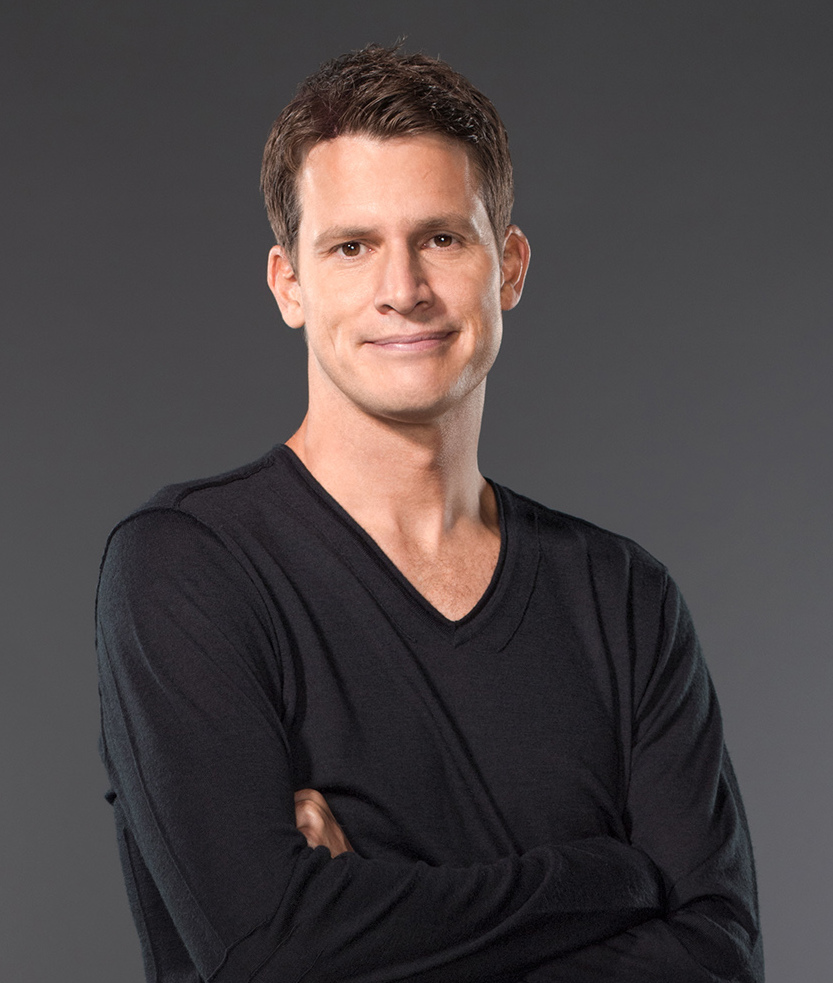
Daniel Tosh
Comedian & host of Tosh.0

== Notable faculty ==
The faculty at UCF includes former United States ambassadors (Harriet Elam-Thomas and Ulric Haynes), former United States congressman (Louis Frey Jr.), former vice president of Walt Disney Creative Entertainment (Ron Logan), and a former Davis Cup tennis player (Kareem Al Allaf). Other faculty members have received the Pulitzer Prize and the Janet Heidinger Kafka Prize, develop the Flesch–Kincaid readability tests, and authored works in the Mathematical Circles and Political Analysis series. Faculty members affiliated with the Florida Space Institute have also participated in NASA missions, including the Global-scale Observations of the Limb and Disk (GOLD) mission, which made UCF the first university in Florida to lead a NASA mission.

== See also ==
- Greater Orlando
- State University System of Florida
