= University of Central Florida Libraries =

Library system

Coordinates: 28°36′0.5″N 81°12′6.1″W

- Location: Central Florida, United States
- Type: Academic library
- Established: June 24, 1968; 57 years ago
- Branches: 11

Collection
- Size: 2.2 million volumes 3.2 million microfilms 43,000 subscriptions 330,000 documents

Access and use
- Circulation: 410,000 annually
- Population served: 2 million annually
- Members: 70,000+ (UCF students and faculty)

Other information
- Budget: $12.8 million
- Director: Beau Case
- Employees: 110
- Website: http://library.ucf.edu

The University of Central Florida's Libraries is a university library system that is administered by the University of Central Florida, a metropolitan public research university located in Orlando, Florida, United States. The system, which stretches across Central Florida, includes eleven libraries of the university and provides primary support to all academic programs.

The libraries serve UCF's students and faculty, and paid memberships are available to local residents. The system includes two branch libraries, seven regional campus libraries, in addition to the main library, the Harriet F. Ginsburg Health Sciences Library at the College of Medicine, Lake Nona, and a research library at the Florida Solar Energy Center. As is common in research libraries, library materials are housed in a variety of locations depending upon discipline. The current director of libraries is Barry Baker.

== Collection ==
UCF Libraries collections include over 2 million print volumes, 3 million microforms, 300,000 government documents, 10,000 full text electronic journal subscriptions, 600,000 e-books, 40,000 media titles, a base of 17,000 serial subscriptions, in addition to special collections and university archives materials.

The libraries have also built a number of research collections. Notable collections within the library include the Malkoff Book Arts Collection, the Van Sickle Leftist Pamphlet collection, the Bryant West Indies collection, collections of materials on tourism and hospitality, the West Indies, the Everglades, and materials on the history of Central Florida. The main campus library, named after UCF's fourth president John C. Hitt, also houses the university archives. The archives hold publications and records of UCF dating back to its founding as Florida Technological University in 1963. During the course of the year, collections and materials are often on display in the main lobby of the John C. Hitt Library.

The libraries also serve as partial depository for both United States and Florida government publications. UCF Libraries is a partner within the State University System of Florida Libraries.

Currently, the library is working on its 21st Century Library Project, a multi-phased plan designed to create additional space for student learning, technology, collaboration, and research expansion. The project upon completion will include the construction of a four-story automated retrieval center, increased quiet study space, and the creation of additional research and writing facilities on the fifth floor.

== Branches ==
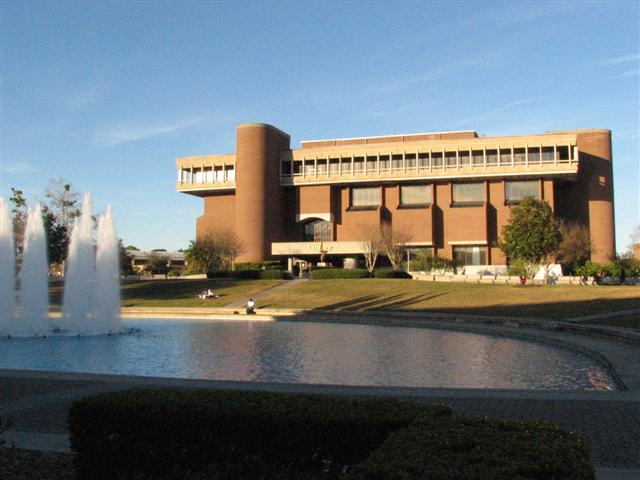
The John C. Hitt Library, with the Reflection Pond in the foreground

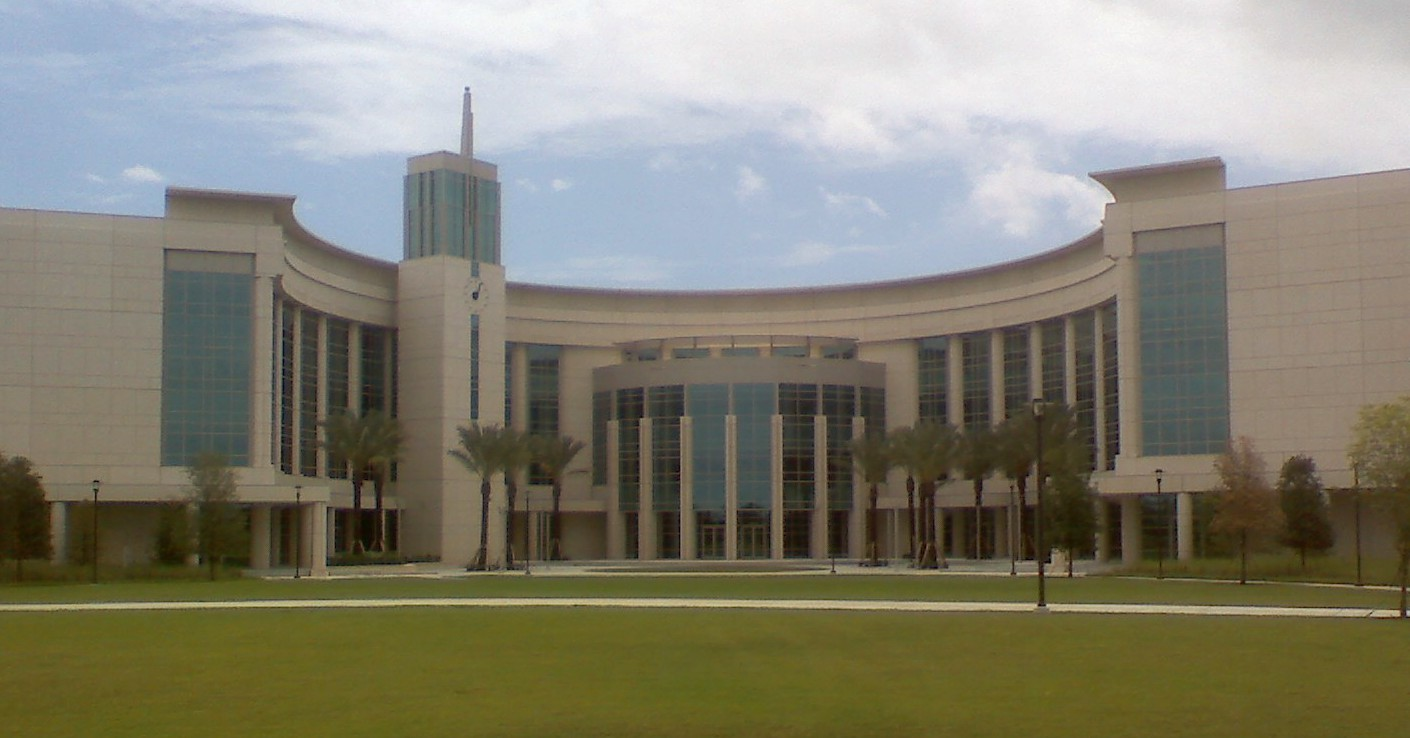
UCF College of Medicine

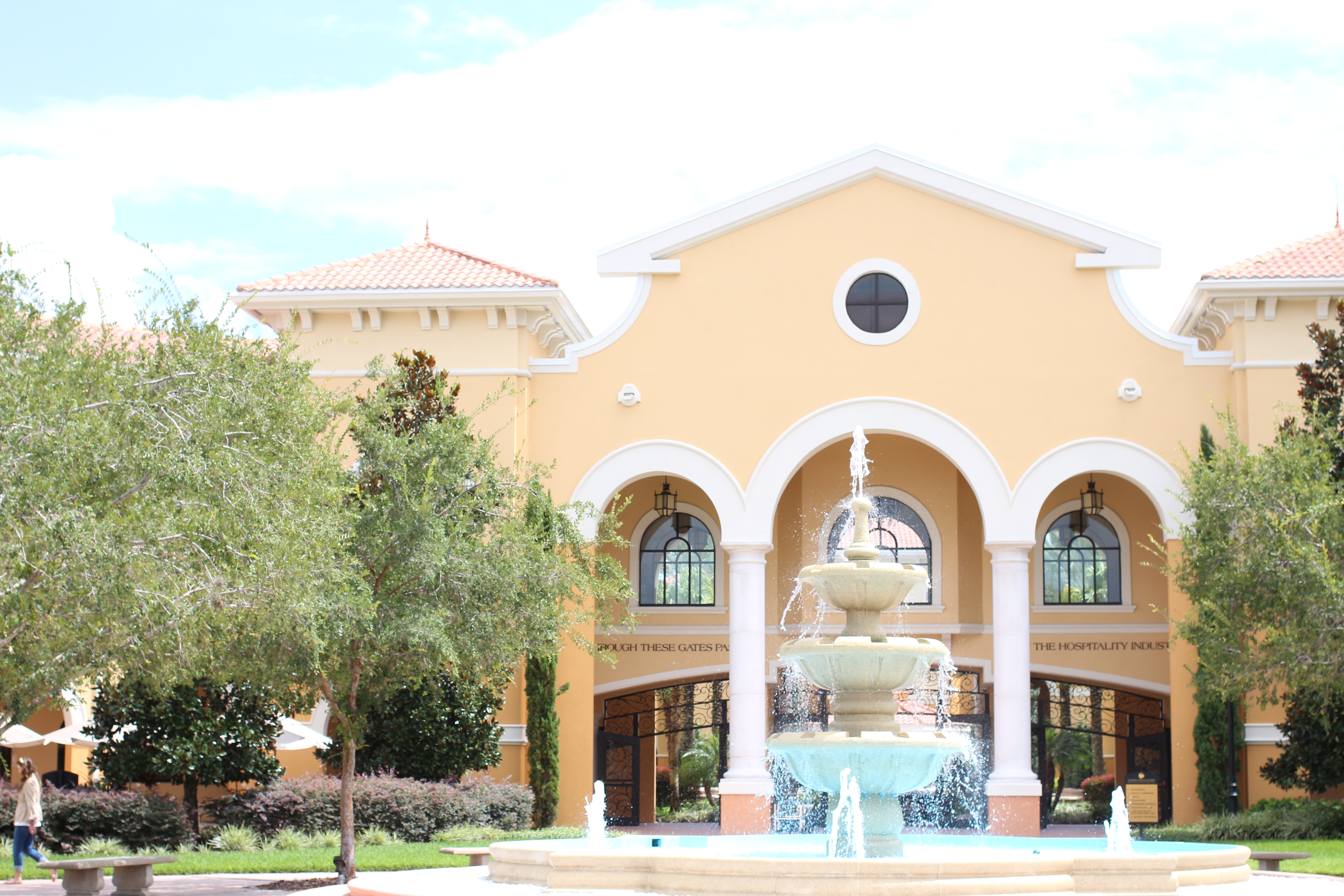
Rosen College of Hospitality Management

Library	Specifications
John C. Hitt Library (Main library)	The main library in the UCF Library System. It holds the majority of the systems collections, including resources supporting the university's academic programs, research centers, and the university archives. The library is also a repository of United States and Florida government documents. The Hitt Library was the first academic building built and used at then–Florida Technological University. It underwent significant renovations that more than doubled the size of the library in 1985. The Board of Trustees recently approved a $64.4 million renovation that will add an additional 212,400 square feet (19,730 m^{2}), as well as an Automated Retrieval System.
Cocoa & Palm Bay	The library is a joint-use facility that is administered by the library system and Brevard Community College.
Curriculum Materials Center	Provides collections and services for the College of Education. The collection houses P-12 curriculum materials, as well as a production lab in the Education Building on UCF's main campus.
Daytona Beach	A facility operated in partnership with Daytona State College.
Florida Solar Energy Center Research Library	The library supports research at the Florida Solar Energy Center. The facility houses a large collection of books, periodicals, documents, and technical reports from the Department of Energy and other federal and state governmental and private agencies.
Harriet F. Ginsburg Health Sciences Library	The Health Sciences Library serves the academic, research, and clinical information needs of the College of Medicine and the Burnett School of Biomedical Sciences. It focuses on health care, and provides resources necessary for the education and research required on the Health Sciences Campus. The library specializes in electronic medical resources.
Ocala	The library is a joint-use facility administered alongside the College of Central Florida.
Osceola & West Orlando	A joint-use location that is operated in partnership with Valencia College.
Sanford & Lake Mary	The facility is administered as a joint-use library by the UCF Library System and Seminole State College.
South Lake	A library that is operated in conjunction with Lake–Sumter State College.
Universal Orlando Foundation Library at Rosen College	Provides collections and services for the Rosen College of Hospitality Management. The collection holds materials relating to the hospitality industry, including the areas of event management, golf and club management, lodging management, restaurant management, theme park management, and tourism management. The facility also serves as one of seven depository libraries in the United States for the United Nations World Tourism Organization (WTO). The library was named after a donation of money and materials by Universal Orlando.
Addition Financial Downtown Campus Library	The Downtown Campus Library opened in August 2019 and is operated in conjunction with Valencia College. The facility provides library services to students and faculty in legal studies, business administration, health information technology and administration, and digital media programs. It is also open to the public.

== Other library collections ==
Library	Specifications
Digital Collections	The University of Central Florida Digital Collections is a constantly growing collection of digital resources from the libraries' collections as well as partner institutions. All materials are open access, and full text searchable. The UCF Digital Collections' holdings include books, articles, newspapers, photos, videos, audio, and more.
Special Collections and University Archives (SCUA)	The University of Central Florida's Special Collections and University Archives department specializes in the preservation, organization, and digitization of archival material that is historically relevant to the State of Florida, the theme parks, Florida tourism, and the university. The department, which is located on the 5th floor of the John C. Hitt Library, is open to students, faculty, and the public by appointment only.
Government Documents Archive	UCF's Government Documents collections are a part of the Federal Depository Library Program (FDLP), the Florida Public Documents Depository Program (FPDDP), and the Patent and Trademark Depository Library Program (PTDLP). The Government Collections include state and federal documents, district maps, newspapers, and research guides to assist with finding information on various government topics.

== See also ==
- George A. Smathers Libraries
- Orange County Library System
- State University System of Florida
- State University System of Florida Libraries
