= State University System of Florida Libraries =

State University System of Florida
- Seal of the State of Florida
- Type: Public university system
- Established: 1905
- Endowment: $2.92 billion (Combined)
- Chancellor: Frank Brogan
- Students: 302,513 (Fall 2008)
- Location: (United States) Tallahassee, FL, USA
- Campus: 12 member institutions

The State University System of Florida Libraries is the academic library system of the State University System of Florida (SUS). The library system, which serves Florida's twelve public universities, is one of the largest in the world, with more than 18 million items. Though each campus library is separate, they share a reciprocal borrowing agreement known as the Florida Distance Learning Initiative, signed on February 9, 1999.

The physical collections are scattered across each of the SUS campuses. Their collections and stand-alone library buildings are listed below. Due to organizational differences, having more libraries does not directly translate into a higher volume of specific collections of materials.

== List of collections by campus ==
=== Florida A&M University ===
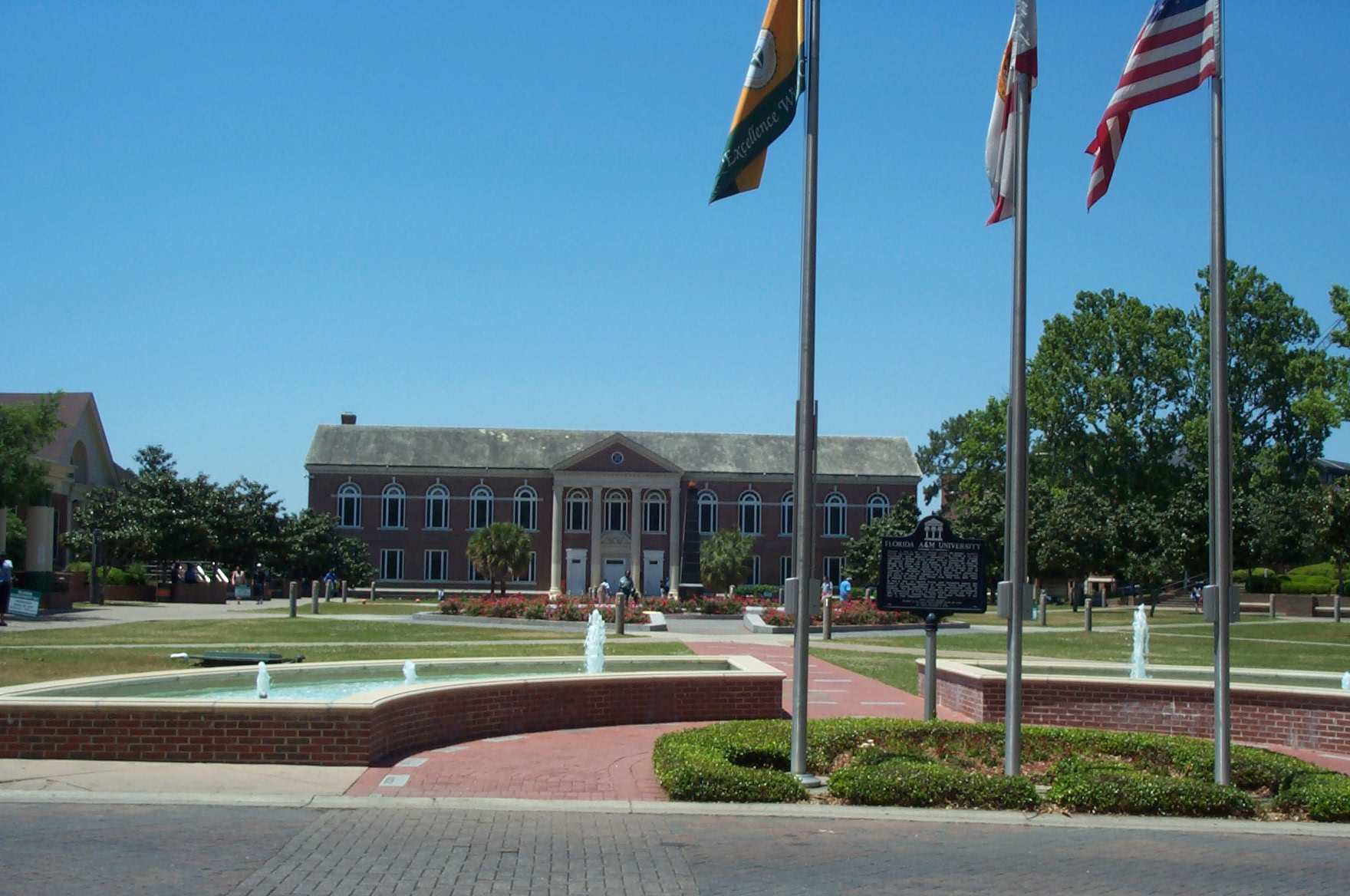
Coleman Memorial Library

Library
Samuel H. Coleman Memorial Library
Architecture Library
Journalism and Graphic
Communication Center
Science Research Center Library

=== Florida Atlantic University ===
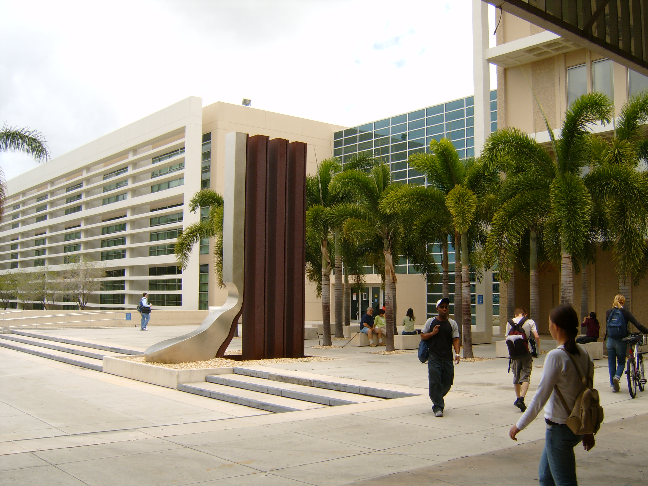
Wimberly Library

Library
S.E. Wimberly Library
College Library (Davie)
Broward County Main Library
FAU Harbor Branch Library
John D. MacArthur Campus Library
St. Lucie West Library

=== Florida Gulf Coast University ===
Library
Florida Gulf Coast University Library

=== Florida International University ===
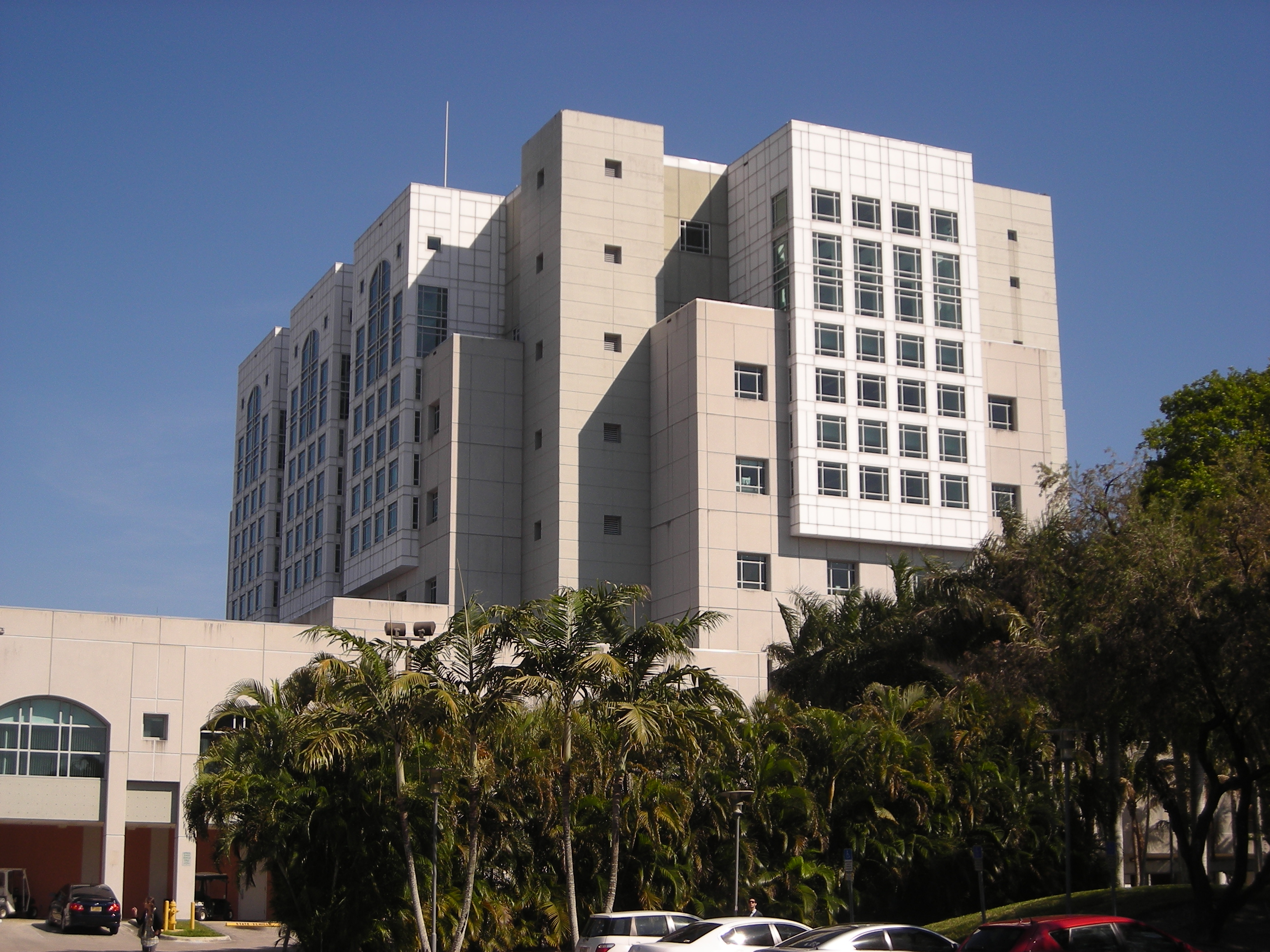
The FIU Green Library

Library
Architecture Library
Broward-Pines Center Library
FIU Digital Collections
Downtown Miami Library (Metropolitan Center)
Engineering Library
Glenn Hubert Library (BBC Library)
Green Library (Main Library)
Law Library
Medical Library
Wolfsonian-FIU Library

=== Florida State University ===
Library
Robert Manning Strozier Library
Paul Adrien Dirac Science Library
College of Engineering Library
College of Law Library
Harold Goldstein Library
Maguire Medical Library
Warren D. Allen Music Library
Panama City Campus Library
John and Mable Ringling Museum of Art Library
Career Center Library
Mildred & Claude Pepper Library
FSU Reading Room

=== New College of Florida ===
Library
Jane Bancroft Cook Library (Sarasota)

=== University of Central Florida ===
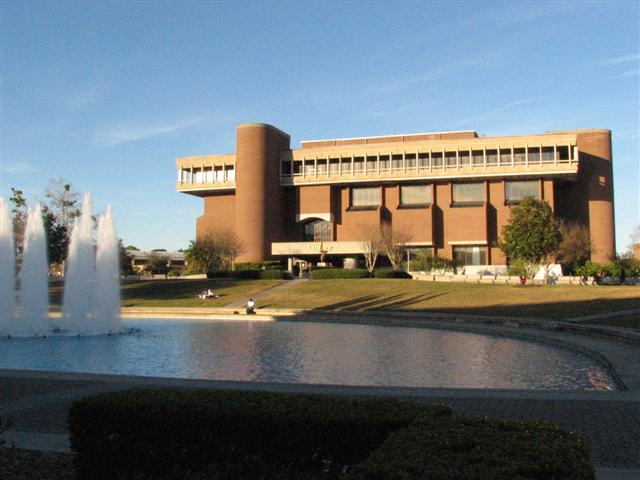
John C. Hitt Library

Library
John C. Hitt Library
Curriculum Materials Center Library
Florida Solar Energy Center Research Library
Harriet F. Ginsburg Health Sciences Library
Universal Orlando Foundation Library
Regional Campus Library (Palm Bay)
Regional Campus Library (Daytona Beach)
Regional Campus Library (Ocala)
Regional Campus Library (Osceola)
Regional Campus Library (Lake Mary)
Regional Campus Library (South Lake)

=== University of Florida ===
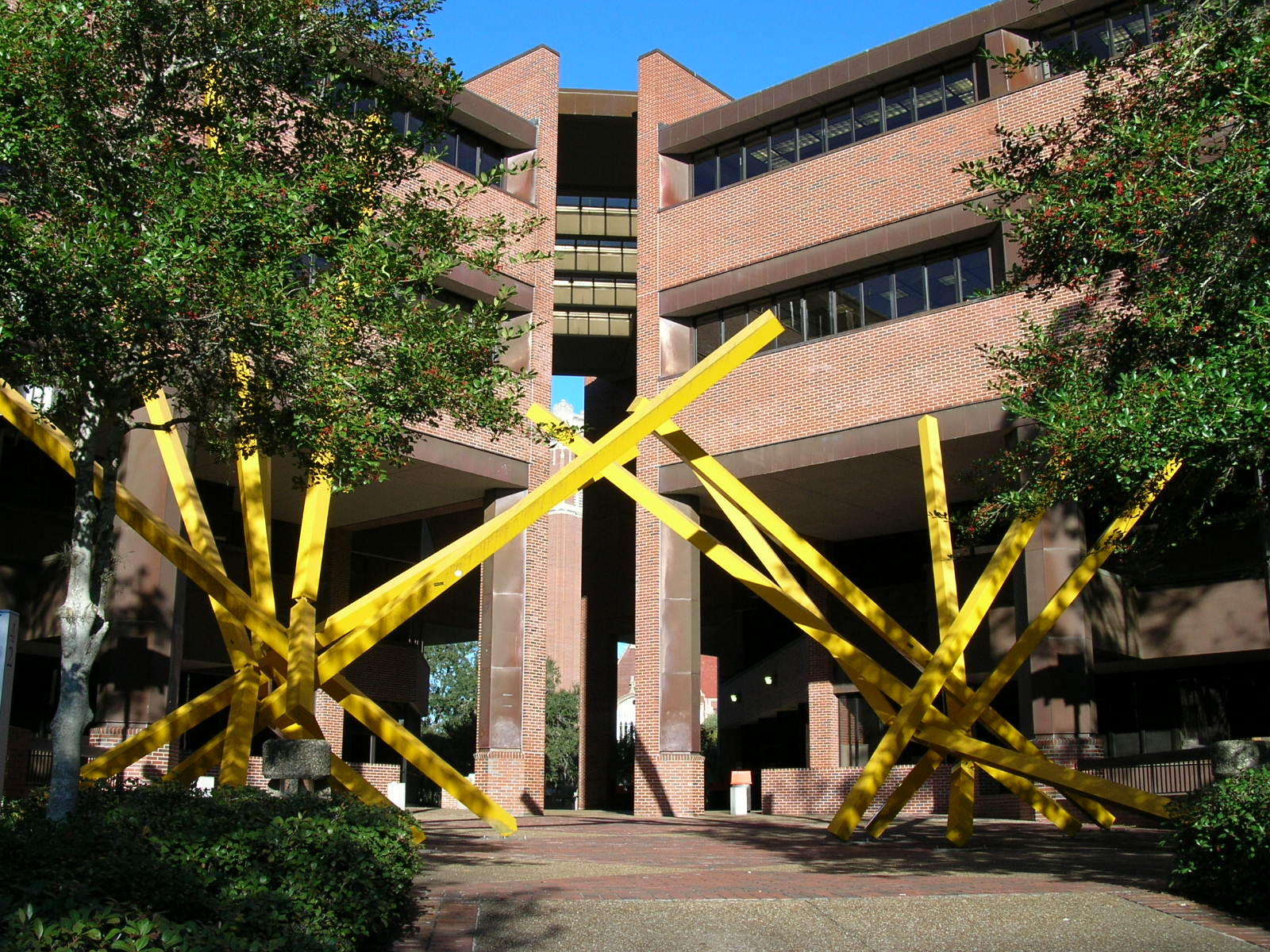
Marston Science Library

Library
Smathers Library
Marston Science Library
Architecture and Fine Arts Library
College of Education Library
University of Florida Library West
University of Florida Latin American Collection
Allen H. Neuharth Library
School of Music Library
University of Florida Digital Collections
University of Florida Baldwin Library
Health Science Center Library
Vet Med Reading Room Library
Borland Library (Jacksonville)
Lawton Chiles Legal Information Center

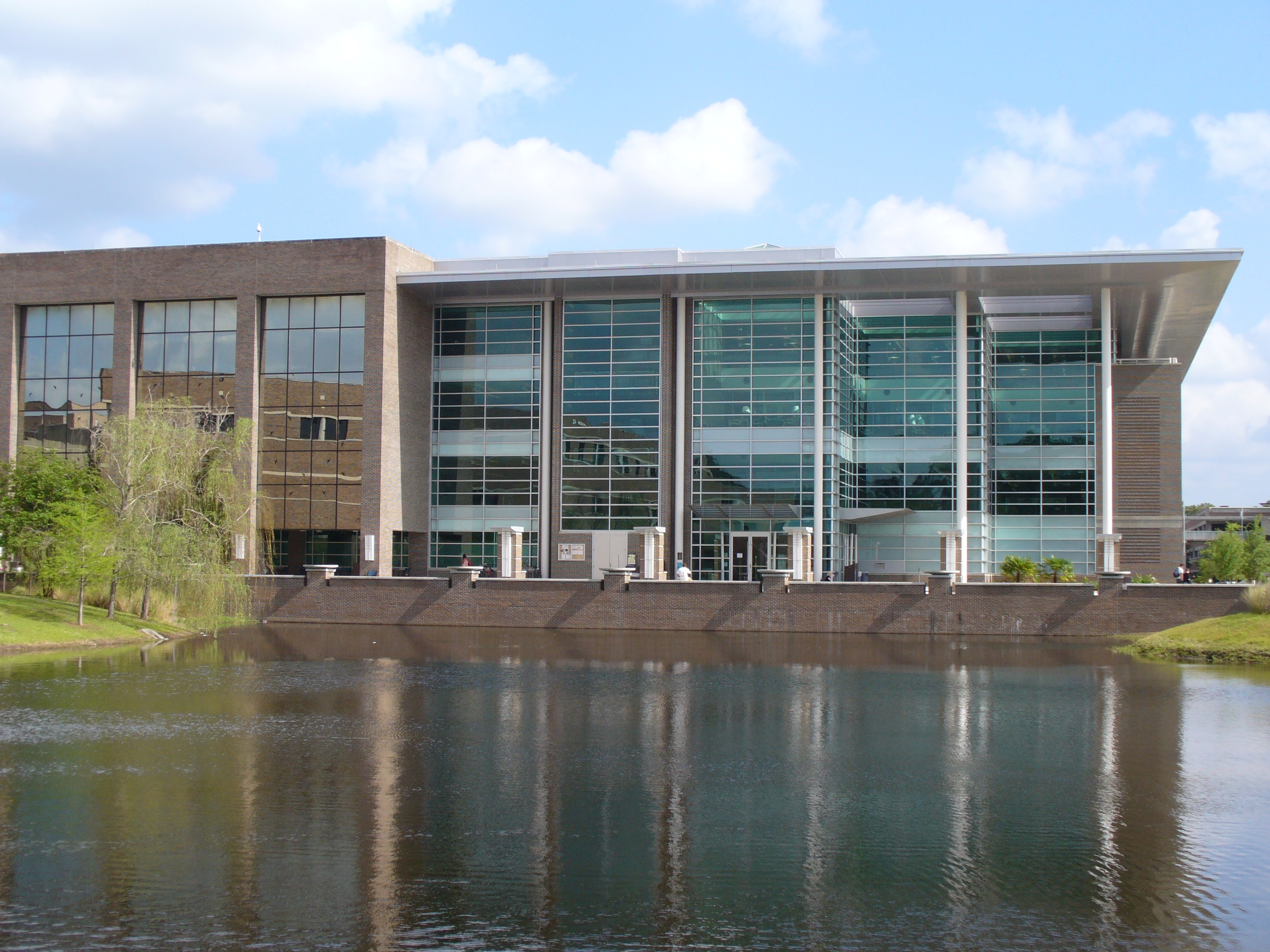
Carpenter Library

=== University of North Florida ===
Library
Thomas G. Carpenter Library (Jacksonville)

=== University of South Florida ===
Library
Main Campus Library
Nelson Poynter Memorial Library
Jane Bancroft Cook Library
USF Polytechnic Library
Hinks and Elaine Shimberg
Health Science Center Library
Mental Health Institute Research Library

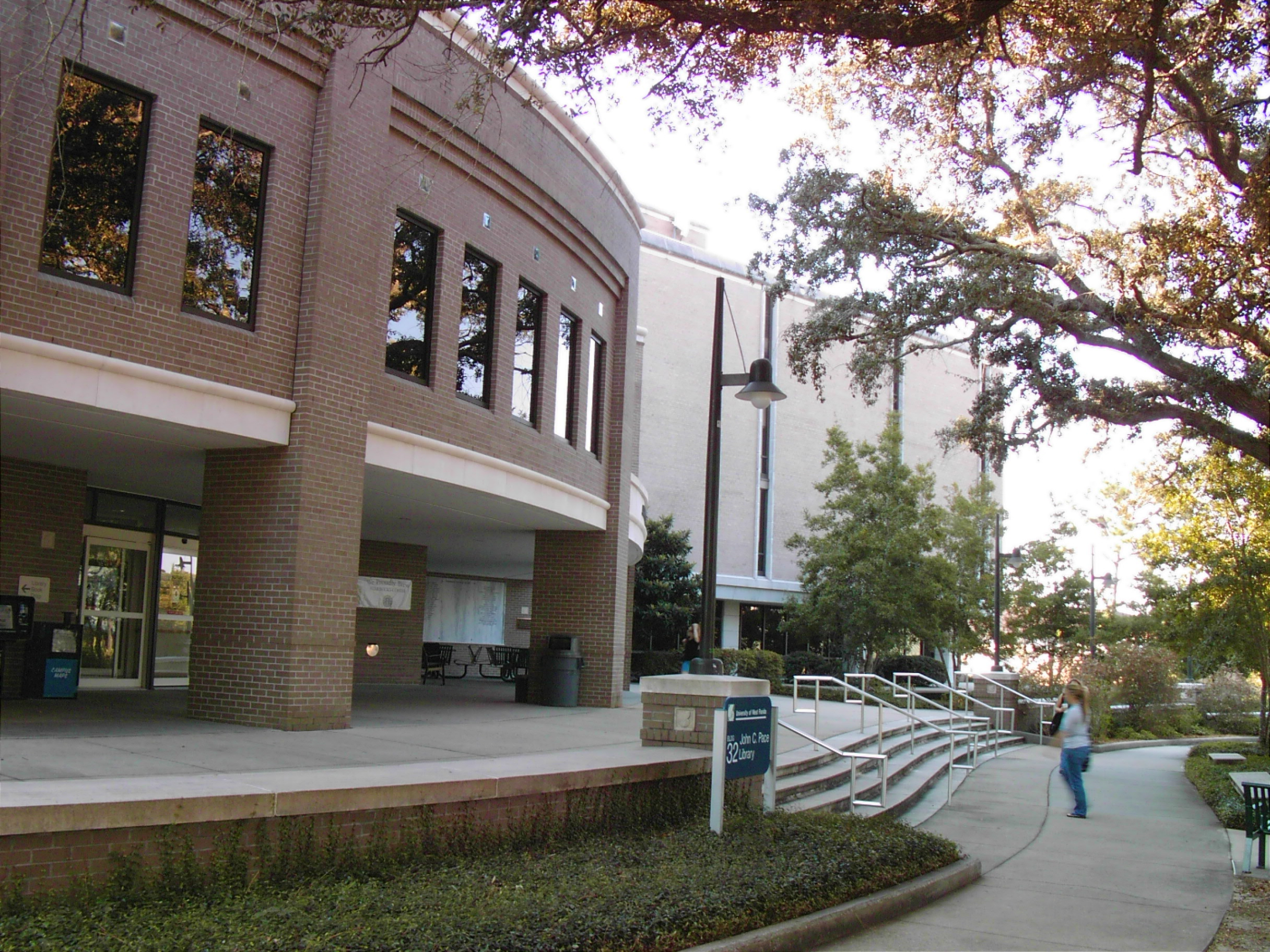
Pace Library

=== University of West Florida ===
Library
John C. Pace Library (Pensacola)

== See also ==
- Education in Florida
- Florida College System
- Florida Board of Regents
- Florida Board of Control
- Florida Board of Governors
- Florida Student Association
- Florida Department of Education
- Bright Futures Scholarship Program
- State University System of Florida
- Advisory Council of Faculty Senates
- List of colleges and universities in Florida
