= University of Central Florida research centers =

Coordinates: 28.58786°N 81.19933°W

The University of Central Florida is a metropolitan public research university located on a 1,415-acre (5.73 km^{2}) main campus in Orlando, Florida, United States. UCF is a member institution of the State University System of Florida and is the second-largest university in the United States.

The university has made noted research contributions to optics, modeling and simulation, digital media, engineering and computer science, business administration, education and hospitality management. The UCF Office of Research & Commercialization is responsible for the organization and administration of the university's research centers, institutes and partners. The Office is located directly south of the main campus in the Central Florida Research Park, which is one of the largest research parks in the nation. Providing more than 10,000 jobs, the Research Park is the largest research park in Florida, the fourth largest in the United States by number of companies, and the seventh largest in the United States by number of employees. Collectively, UCF's research centers and the park manage over $5.5 billion in contracts annually.

Significant research also takes place on UCF's Health Sciences Campus in Lake Nona. The campus includes the university's College of Medicine and Burnett School of Biomedical Sciences, as well as the Sanford-Burnham Medical Research Institute, M.D. Anderson Orlando Cancer Research Institute, and a University of Florida Academic and Research Center. It is estimated that the campus will create up to 30,000 jobs and have a $7.8 billion economic impact by 2020.

== Research centers and institutes ==
- Advanced Materials Processing and Analysis Center
- Biomolecular Science Center
- Center for Advanced Turbomachinery and Energy Research
- Center for Advanced Transportation Systems Simulation
- Center for Advancing Faculty Excellence
- Center for Engineering Leadership and Learning
- Center for Emerging Media
- Center for Research and Education in Optics and Lasers
- Center for Research in Computer Vision
- Coastal Hydroscience Analysis, Modeling & Predictive Simulations Lab (CHAMPS)
- College of Optics and Photonics
- Dick Pope, Sr. Institute for Tourism Studies
- Environmental Systems Engineering Institute
- Florida Advanced Manufacturing Research Center
- Florida Energy Systems Consortium: Energy Conversion Research
- Florida Interactive Entertainment Academy
- Florida Photonics Center of Excellence
- Florida Power Electronics Center
- Florida Sinkhole Research Institute
- Florida Solar Energy Center
- Florida Space Institute
- Interdisciplinary Information Science and Technology Lab
- Institute for Advanced Systems Engineering (IASE)
- Institute for Economic Competitiveness
- Institute for Simulation and Training
- LAN Institute
- Lou Frey Institute of Politics and Government
- M.D. Anderson Cancer Research Institute
- NanoScience Technology Center
- National Center for Forensic Science
- National Center for Simulation
- Progress Energy Leadership Institute
- Sanford-Burnham Medical Research Institute
- Stormwater Management Academy
- Townes Laser Institute
- Transportation Systems Institute
- Wekiva Resource Council
