= Tavistock Group =

Bahamas-based private investment organization

- Type: Private
- Industry: Private Equity
- Founded: 1975; 51 years ago
- Founders: Joseph "Joe" Lewis and Daniel Levy
- Headquarters: The Bahamas
- Key people: Nicholas Beucher and Josh Levy (Co-CEOs)
- Products: ENIC International Ltd; Tottenham Hotspur
- Website: www.tavistock.com

Tavistock Group is a Bahamas-based private investment organization founded in 1975. It has offices in 13 countries; Bahamas, the United Kingdom, Australia, Canada, Mexico, the United States, Jamaica, Argentina, Poland, Moldova, Romania, Bulgaria, and Sri Lanka.

== Investment portfolio ==
=== Master planned communities ===
==== Lake Nona, Orlando, Florida ====
Tavistock Group is the developer of Lake Nona, a multi-faceted, 17-square-mile (44 km2, 10,900 acre, 4,400 hectare) mixed-use development in southeast Orlando. This large-scale community was designed to host education, medical and recreational facilities, a life sciences cluster, diverse workspaces, and a range of residential options.

The centerpiece of the community is Lake Nona Medical City—which includes the University of Central Florida College of Medicine and the Sanford-Burnham Medical Research Institute, the University of Florida Academic and Research Center, Nemours Children’s Hospital, and the Orlando Veterans Affairs Medical Center.
