= Watson Realty Corp. =

Independent real estate company

- Industry: Real estate
- Founded: Jacksonville, Florida (1965)
- Headquarters: Florida, U.S.
- Key people: William A. Watson (Jr. Founder & Chairman of the Board); Ed Forman (President)
- Number of employees: 1,400
- Website: Watson Realty Corp.

Watson Realty Corp. is an independent real estate company headquartered in Jacksonville, Florida, United States. It has 51 offices and 1,400 employees in Northeast Florida, Central Florida, and Southeast Georgia.

== History ==
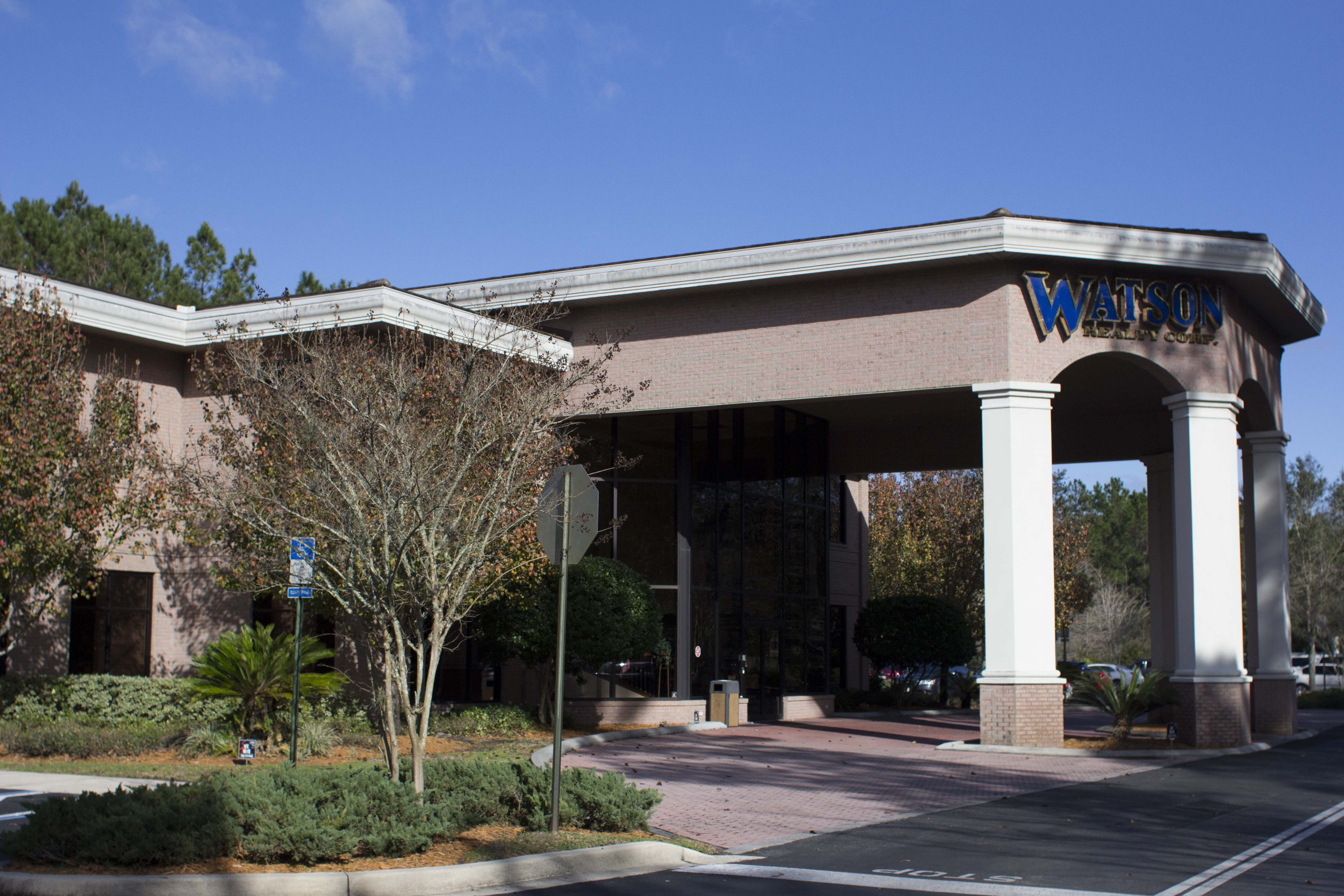
Watson Realty Corp. headquarters

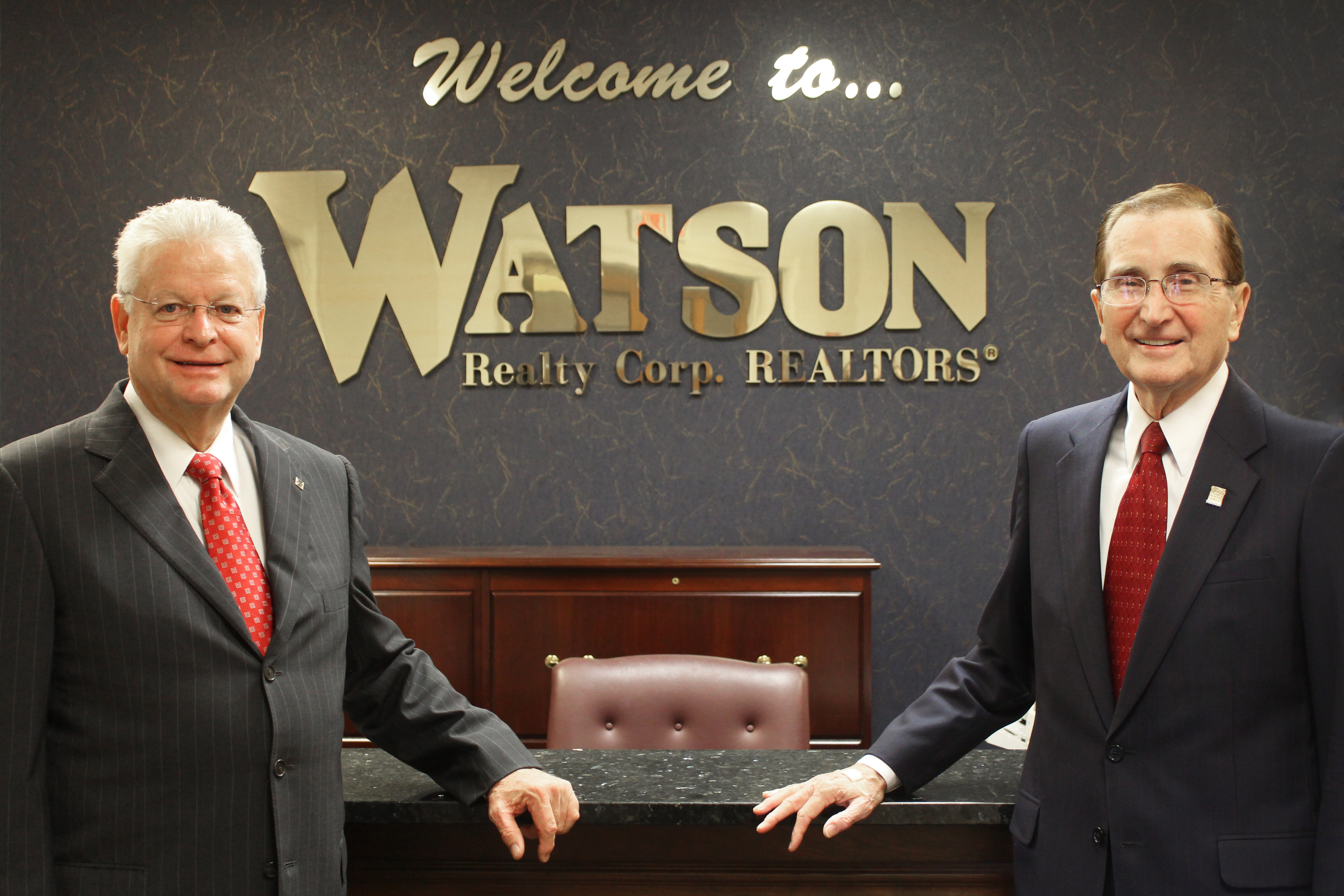
Watson Realty Corp.'s Ed Forman, president and Mr. Watson, founder and chairman of the board

Watson Realty Corp. was formed in 1965 by William A. Watson, Jr. The company's first office was located in Jacksonville, as a single-office real estate company in a shared storefront with William A. Watson and one part-time sales agent.

Its founder, William A. Watson Jr., was born in Jacksonville, the son and grandson of railroad conductors for what today is CSX Corp. After graduation in 1959, Watson joined Gifford Grange Realty in 1960. When Grange left the business to enter politics, Watson opened his own brokerage on the Southside. He offered property management and fire and casualty insurance in addition to real estate services. Watson opened his first branch office in 1970. It would later be renamed for the final time to Watson Realty Corp. in 1976.

In 1979, Watson opened branches in Gainesville, Orlando, Longwood, Deland, and Daytona. In 1985, the company opened its first office outside of Florida in St. Marys, Georgia.

Watson established a family of service companies in 1994 with the opening of Watson Mortgage Corp. and, in 2002, Watson Title Services of North Florida, Inc.

In 1999, Watson Realty Corp. acquired Palm Coast Home Realty. Palm Coast Home Realty was the resale real estate marketing division of ITT Community Development Corp., the initial developer of Palm Coast, a 15,000-home community halfway between St. Augustine and Daytona Beach.

In 2017, the company merged with All Florida Realty, offering services to Melbourne, Port St. Lucie, Vero Beach, and Port Charlotte.

Currently, Watson Realty Corp. has 51 offices, including the newest location in Lake Nona. The company headquarters are located in Jacksonville at 7821 Deercreek Club Rd. in the Southside area. The company has offices in the Northeast and Central Florida, as well as Southeast Georgia.
