= Florida Space Institute =

- Type: Research institute
- Established: 1996; 30 years ago
- Director: Dr. Alain Berinstain
- Location: Orlando, Florida, United States; 28°35′10″N 81°11′51″W
- Website: fsi.ucf.edu

The Florida Space Institute (FSI) is a research institute of the State University System of Florida and the University of Central Florida, located in Orlando, Florida.

FSI is currently led by Director Dr. Alain Berinstain.

== History ==
In 1981, NASA's Space Transportation System commenced spaceflight operations utilizing the John F. Kennedy Space Center as a launch point for equatorial orbit and as a primary landing site for return to Earth. Concurrent with NASA's return to human spaceflight operations for the first time since 1975, the State of Florida proposed the establishment of a research institute on Florida's Space Coast that would be focused on bringing research activities from the space sector to Florida. Leading this effort was an engineering faculty member of the University of Central Florida (UCF), Dr. Ron Phillips, who worked with the State of Florida to create what became known as the Space Education and Research Center (SERC) in 1990. Established and located adjacent to the Kennedy Space Center (KSC) in Brevard County, Florida, SERC initially focused on civilian and commercial space activities, while military space activities were managed separately by the U.S. Department of Defense. In 1996, SERC was renamed the Florida Space Institute (FSI) as a Type-1 institute under the State University System of Florida. FSI would also later establish a presence in the Astronaut Memorial Foundation facilities at the Kennedy Space Center Visitors Complex.

In 2012, FSI was rechartered, ostensibly to allow it a broader portfolio of research and education activities while also simplifying its organizational and fiscal governance under UCF, versus reporting directly to the Board of Governors of the State University System of Florida. It also moved FSI from the Kennedy Space Center to the Central Florida Research Park in Orange County, Florida, south of and immediately adjacent to the UCF main campus.

An unintended consequence of this rechartering was that it concurrently downgraded FSI's status from that of a State of Florida Institute (previously known as a Type 1 institute) to a lower echelon University Institute (previously known as a Type 2 institute) pursuant to State University System of Florida Board of Governors Regulation 10.015.

This rechartering and move of FSI also coincided with and was influenced by two events:

The first, on a national level, was the Obama administration's cancellation of the Constellation program (CxP), NASA's intended follow-on crewed space program to follow the Space Shuttle, the end of NASA's Space Shuttle program in 2011, the associated uncertainties regarding the future of U.S.-crewed space flight, and the anticipated negative economic impacts to Central Florida in general and Brevard County in particular as both NASA and NASA contractor activities and employment declined.

The second event, on a state level, was the April 2012 direction to the Board of Governors of the State University System (SUS) of Florida to transition the then-University of South Florida Polytechnic, a Polk County/Lakeland, Florida branch campus of the University of South Florida in Tampa, to an independent institution. Renamed Florida Polytechnic University (FPU), it would become the 12th public university in Florida and the only one focused exclusively on undergraduate and postgraduate STEM degrees pursuant to Florida Senate Bill 1994 and Section 1004.345 of the Florida Statutes (2012). To partially fund this independent status for FPU, the Florida Legislature proposed significant funding reductions to all the other institutions in the State University System of Florida, including funding reductions for UCF. Moving a number state institutes like FSI from state control to the control of individual universities was seen as a means to help increase the prestige of those universities while also enabling those universities to potentially realize an additional revenue stream by imposing Facilities & Administrative (F&A) charges on any federal, state, or private sector grants those institutes might receive.

Today, FSI continues to operate within the University of Central Florida (UCF) and in partnership with other FSI member colleges and universities in Florida. FSI also plays an additional role, aiming to support the development of Florida’s space economy across its civilian, military/national defense, and commercial segments. FSI also administratively houses the Florida Space Grant Consortium (FSCG) for NASA and operates the Space Research Initiative (SRI) for the State of Florida.

== Partner institutions ==
The Florida Space Institute is part of a broad statewide partnership within the State University System to support and expand Florida's involvement in the field of space exploration. Since its move to Orlando, the institute falls under the organizational and fiscal governance of UCF, though it continues to support research and development projects and services at partner institutions in the State University System, as well as government and corporate institutions.

=== Educational partners ===
- Broward College
- Eastern Florida State College, formerly known as Brevard Community College
- Embry Riddle Aeronautical University
- Florida Agricultural and Mechanical University
- Florida Atlantic University
- Florida Institute of Technology
- Florida Polytechnic University
- Florida State University
- University of Florida
- University of Miami
- University of South Florida

=== Government partners ===
- Federal Emergency Management Agency
- NASA
- NASA Ames Research Center
- NASA Goddard Space Flight Center
- Jet Propulsion Laboratory
- NASA Kennedy Space Center
- National Science Foundation
- United States Special Operations Command

=== Corporate partners ===
- Blue Origin
- SpaceX
- Yang Enterprises

== Science ==
=== Arecibo Observatory ===
The Arecibo Observatory was the world's most powerful planetary radar system, which provided ground-based observations whose quality could only be exceeded with a spacecraft flyby. Built into a natural sinkhole, the 305-meter Arecibo telescope was equipped with a cable-mount steerable receiver and several radar transmitters for emitting signals mounted 150 m (492 ft) above the dish. Completed in 1963, it was the world's largest single-aperture telescope for 53 years, surpassed in July 2016 by the Five-hundred-meter Aperture Spherical Telescope (FAST) in China.

Its 1 MW transmitter at S-band (12.6 cm, 2380 MHz) was used for studies of small bodies in the Solar System, terrestrial planets, and planetary satellites, including the Moon. The Arecibo planetary radar was a powerful tool for post-discovery characterization of near-Earth objects, planets, and moons. In addition to precise line-of-sight velocity and range information, depending on the target's size and distance, planetary radar is useful for quickly estimating the instantaneous rotation rate of near-Earth asteroids, resolving the target's size, detecting potential satellites, and ultimately resolving the shape through inverse modeling efforts.

In 2017, Hurricane Maria damaged the telescope, leading the National Science Foundation (NSF) to consider closing the observatory. A consortium led by the University of Central Florida (UCF) proposed to manage the observatory and cover much of the operations and maintenance costs. In 2018, NSF made UCF's consortium the new site operators, although no specific actions or funding were announced. UCF then designated FSI as the executive agent within UCF for this effort.

On August 10, 2020, and November 6, 2020, two of the receiver's support cables broke and the NSF subsequently announced that it would decommission the telescope. The telescope subsequently sustained a catastrophic collapse on December 1, 2020. In 2022, the NSF announced that the telescope would not be rebuilt, and an educational facility was to be established on the site.

=== Radar Planetary Science ===
The Planetary Radar Group at the Arecibo Observatory, collaborated closely with NASA’s Planetary Defense Coordination Office. Its primary objective was to conduct follow-up observations of newly discovered near-Earth objects (NEOs), particularly those classified as potentially hazardous asteroids (PHAs) that could make close approaches to Earth. Using radar observations, the Arecibo team was able to precisely determine the orbits, velocities, and distances of these asteroids, significantly improving predictions of their future trajectories. Other lines of research included observations of Mercury and the Moon.

Its researchers include Dr. Maxime Devogele, Dr. Sean Marshall, Dr. Anna McGilvray, Dr. Charles Schambeau, Dr. Flaviane Venditti, and Dr. Luisa Fernanda Zambrano-Marin.

=== Radio astronomy ===
Radio astronomy is the study of radio waves produced by a multitude of astronomical objects such as the Sun, planets, pulsars, stars, star-forming regions (i.e., the birthplace of stars), gas clouds, galaxies, supernova remnants, etc. The high sensitivity of the Arecibo radio telescope has allowed astronomers to detect faint radio signals from far-off regions of the universe. The areas of research include Fast radio bursts, Heliophysics and Space weather, Pulsar Studies, Spectral line Studies, Exoplanets, and Very Long Baseline Interferometry (VLBI).

Its researchers include Dr. Periasamy K. Manoharan, Dr. Anna McGilvray, Dr. Benetge Bhakthi Pranama Perera, Dr. Anish Roshi, Dr. Allison Smith, and Dr. Sravani Vaddi.

=== Atmospheric sciences ===
Atmospheric science is the investigation of the Earth's gaseous envelope. Experiments performed at Arecibo measured upper atmosphere composition, temperature, and densities in order to understand the controlling physical processes. The Arecibo Radio Telescope was able to measure the growth and decay of disturbances in the changing layers of charged particles that populate the region known as the ionosphere (i.e., altitudes above 30 miles). The "big dish" was also used to study plasma physics processes in the electrically charged regions of the Earth's atmosphere. where radio waves are influenced most.

Its researchers include Dr. Christiano Garnett Marques Brum, Dr. Selvaraj Dharmalingam, Dr. Jens Lautenbach, Dr. Shikha Raizada, Dr. Pedrina Terra dos Santos, Dr. Sukanta Sau, and Dr. Michael Peter Sulzer.

=== Former Researchers ===
- Dr. Gal Sarid
- Dr. Noemi Pinilla-Alonso
- Dr. Mario De Pra
- Dr. Esther Beltrán

== Publications ==
- Brisset, J., Miletich, T. and Metzger, P., 2020. Thermal extraction of water ice from the lunar surface-A 3D numerical model. Planetary and Space Science, 193, p. 105082.
- Brisset, J., Colwell, J., Dove, A., Abukhalil, S., Cox, C. and Mohammed, N., 2018. Regolith behavior under asteroid-level gravity conditions: low-velocity impact experiments. Progress in Earth and Planetary Science, 5(1), pp. 1–21.
- Brisset, J., Heißelmann, D., Kothe, S., Weidling, R. and Blum, J., 2016. Submillimetre-sized dust aggregate collision and growth properties-Experimental study of a multi-particle system on a suborbital rocket. Astronomy & Astrophysics, 593, p.A3.

== See also ==
- University of Central Florida research centers
