= University of Central Florida College of Dental Medicine =

Coordinates: 28°23′15″N 81°16′00″W

College of Dental Medicine
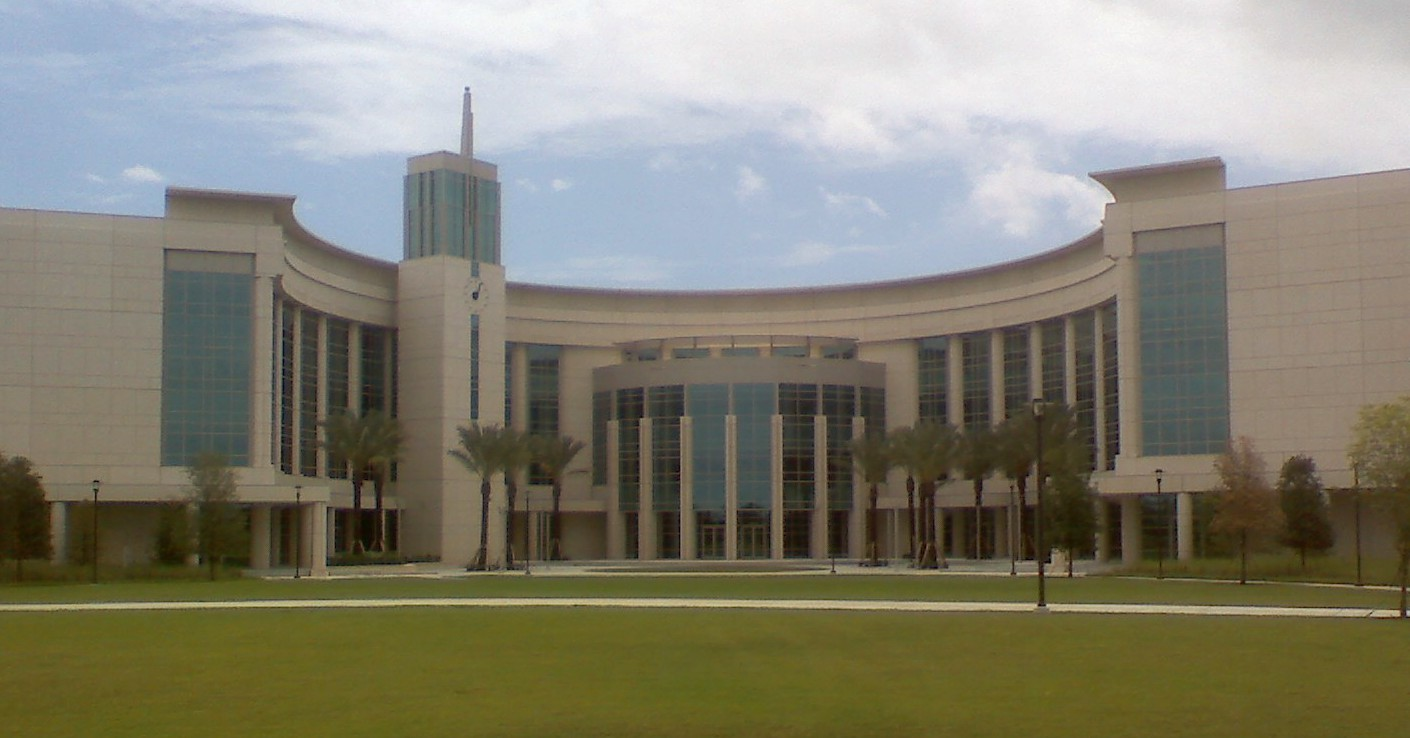
- Type: Public
- Established: 2011; 15 years ago
- Dean: Deborah C. German, M.D. (de facto)
- Location: Orlando, Florida, United States
- Campus: Suburban 75 acres (.2 km^{2})
- Website: Official Site

The University of Central Florida College of Dental Medicine is a planned academic college of the University of Central Florida located in Orlando, Florida, United States. Approved by the UCF Board of Trustees in May 2011, the college still needs to seek approval from the Florida Board of Governors and accreditation from the American Dental Association.

When completed, the college will include a public dental school and be housed on the UCF Health Sciences Campus in Lake Nona Medical City, a neighborhood of Orlando.

== History ==
In early May 2011, UCF announced that the board of trustees would consider a motion to create a new College of Dental Medicine. This followed a private donation of $10 million to the university for the purpose of creating a dental school. On May 26, 2011, the Board voted to approve the new college. The current dean of the UCF College of Medicine, Dr. Deborah C. German, will lead the effort to create the college.

In October 2011, the Florida Board of Governors rejected the UCF College of Dental Medicine proposal, citing a lack of need demonstrated. Since an expansion of the University of Florida College of Dentistry was also rejected by the Florida Board of Governors, it was suggested that the two universities form a partnership to both allow the University of Florida to expand its College of Dentistry and the University of Central Florida to establish its own College of Dentistry. UCF to re-submitted its proposal for the College of Dentistry in November 2011.

Following the November 2011 meeting, much of the University of Central Florida's proposal remained the same, with plans to use a $10 million donation, a loan with itself, and student tuition to fund the College of Dental Medicine. New in the proposal, however, was the use of the University of Florida as adviser in building the school. The proposal also included more details about how the College of Dentistry would provide dentists for underserved areas. The University of Central Florida would focus on recruiting students from these underserved areas and would provide its own dental clinic to treat patients in these areas. UCF is still working with state and university officials and plans for the college to be open by the end of the decade.

"The College of Dental Medicine will mean opportunities for our local students to obtain a dental education that they must now leave our area to achieve," UCF President John C. Hitt said in the document. "The college will mean opportunities to help more people in need of dental care who cannot afford it. And it will mean opportunities to provide Central Florida with new jobs and an economic boost in challenging times."

== Academics ==
=== Degrees to be offered ===
- Doctor of Dental Medicine (D.M.D.)
