= Deborah German =

American rheumatologist and academic administrator

- Born: Deborah Campano
- Education: Boston University; Harvard University
- Children: 2
- Scientific career
- Fields: Rheumatic and genetic diseases, medical administration
- Workplaces: Duke University; Howard Hughes Medical Institute; Vanderbilt University; Saint Thomas Hospital; University of Central Florida

Deborah Campano German is an American rheumatologist and academic administrator serving as the founding dean of the University of Central Florida College of Medicine since 2006. She was the president and chief executive officer of Saint Thomas Hospital from 2002 to 2004.

== Life ==
German was born to Pasco and Mentana Campano and raised in a working-class Italian home in Cumberland, Rhode Island. Her mother was a school cafeteria worker and hairdresser and her father was a mechanical engineer. She graduated from Cumberland High School where she cheered on the varsity team. She earned a bachelor's degree in chemistry with honors from Boston University. She received a M.D. from Harvard Medical School in 1976. German completed an internal medicine residency at the University of Rochester and a rheumatic and genetic diseases fellowship at the Duke University School of Medicine.

German studies rheumatic and genetic diseases. German was the associate dean of medical education at Duke University School of Medicine. She researched adenosine metabolism at the Howard Hughes Medical Institute. She joined Vanderbilt University School of Medicine in 1988. She was an associate dean of students for ten years before serving as the senior dean of medical education from 1999 to 2002. German was the first woman to serve in the later role. In 2000, she was received the Athena Award for excellence by women in the Nashville, Tennessee area. She was a professor of medical administration and associate professor of medicine. In 2001, she also operated a rheumatology practice. She cofounded Tennessee Women in Medicine. German was the president and chief executive officer of Saint Thomas Hospital from 2002 to 2004. She was a Petersdorf Scholar in Residence at the Association of American Medical Colleges in 2005. In October 2006, German was the lone finalist to serve as the founding dean of the University of Central Florida College of Medicine. She was appointed as the founding dean of the college of medicine in December 2006. German is vice president of health affairs for the University of Central Florida. On October 12th, 2023, German was named the Central Florida Woman of the Year by the Women's Executive Council of Orlando.

German has two daughters.
