= Orange County Library System =

Public libraries in Florida, United States

Coordinates: 28.542252°N 81.377031°W

- Location: 101 East Central Boulevard, Orlando, Florida, 32801, Orlando, Florida, 32801
- Established: 1923
- Branches: 15

Collection
- Size: 1.9 million items

Access and use
- Population served: Approximately 1.4 million

Other information
- Director: Steve Powell
- Employees: ~450
- Website: https://www.ocls.org

The Orange County Library System (OCLS) is a public library system serving the Orlando area of Central Florida. Its main branch is the Orlando Public Library in Downtown Orlando. There are 15 additional branch locations.

As of 2025, the library system employed more than 450 staff. The library's CEO/Library Director is Steve Powell, and it has a five-member Library Board of Trustees that are appointed by Orange County's Board of County Commissioners and the City of Orlando.

== History ==
In the early 1920s, the Sorosis of Orlando Woman's Club maintained a library for Orlando. This collection was initially on the second floor of the Old Armory Building on Court Street, then moved to the Knox building at the intersection of Pine and Court Street. On May 11, 1920, Orlando citizens voted that they wanted a public library.

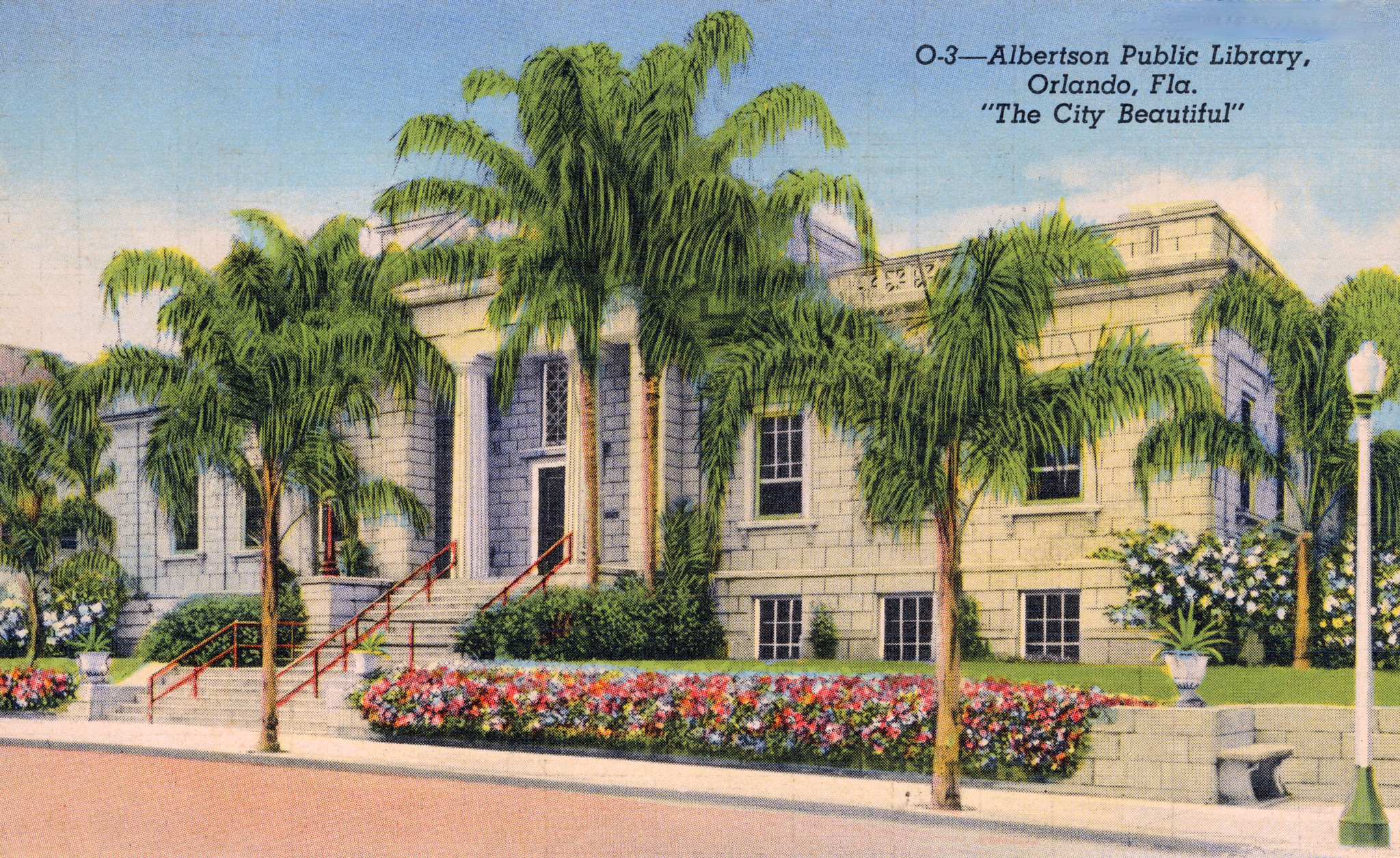
Illustration of Albertson Public Library

Captain Charles L. Albertson, a retired New York City Police Inspector and a winter resident of Orlando, had for many years been collecting books at his home in Waverly, New York. In November 1920, Albertson offered his collection to the City of Orlando, dependent on the following conditions: a suitable building should be furnished to house it, the library should be known as the Albertson Public Library, Albertson should be Advisory Superintendent of the Library throughout his lifetime, and Orlando should suitably maintain the Library. The city agreed, and the Albertson Public Library opened on November 8, 1923. Olive Brumbaugh was selected as the library's first head librarian in April 1923.

In 1924, the Booker T. Washington Branch of the Albertson Library was opened to serve the African American community. This branch library was originally established in the former rectory of an Episcopal church. Eddie T. Jackson assumed the role as librarian. The library was relocated to a new building in 1954 and stayed in that building until 1984, when it was incorporated into the Washington Park Library in the Lila Mitchell Community Center. The building was purchased by the Shiloh Baptist Church in 1994 and renamed the building the T.C. Collier Center. A plaque now hangs at the 528 West Jackson St. location in honor of the Booker T. Washington Library and its librarian Gloria Riley Merriett.

In 1962, construction of a new Main Library was approved by the Orlando voters, and the City acquired adjacent land. In 1964, the library moved to temporary headquarters at 905 North Orange Avenue until the Albertson building was demolished and construction began. The Orlando Public Library was dedicated on August 7, 1966. The architect was John M. Johansen of New Canaan, Connecticut.

In 1978, the Library secured from the Orlando City Council a commitment for the block to the west. In 1980, voters approved the sale of $22 million in bonds for construction. In March 1985, the 1966 building was closed. A Grand Opening Celebration for the expansion and renovation took place April 6, 1986.

The 290,000-square-foot (27,000 m^{2}) building was built with 19,000 cubic yards of concrete. A challenge was given to architect Duane Stark and his team to design an expansion that would blend with the original 1966 Johansen design. The exterior walls were matched to the rough hewn cedar pattern of the original poured-concrete walls.

=== Friends of the Library ===
Organized in 1949, a group of citizens formed The Friends of the Orange County Library System, an all-volunteer nonprofit organization whose role is to support the library and raise funds for library resources not included in the library's budget. The Friends also run the Friends of the Library Bookstore, located on the third floor of the Main library. Library volunteers are managed by the Friends of the Library.

== Branches ==
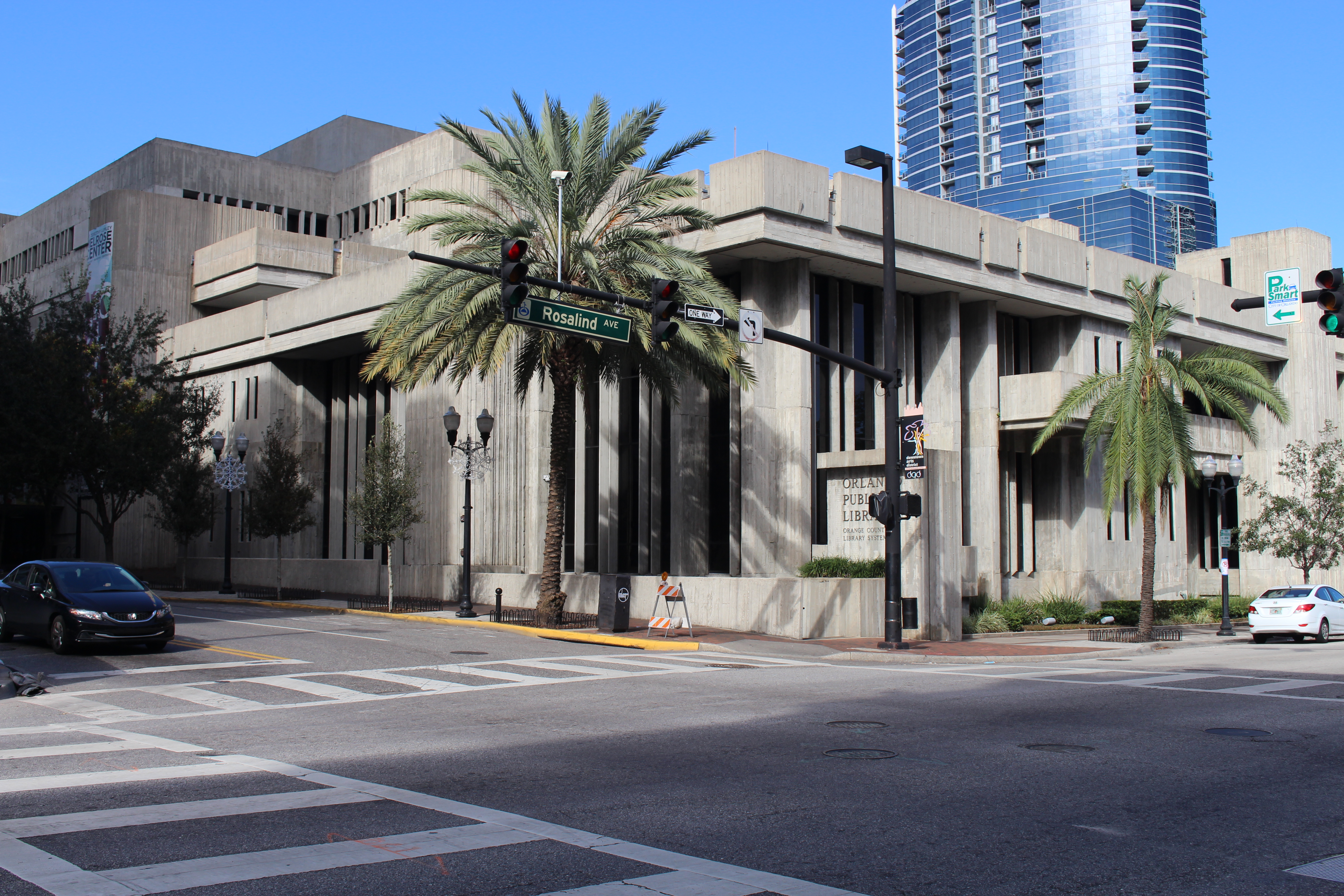
Orlando Public Library

There are 15 branches located throughout Orange County and one main location, the Orlando Public Library. Some of the services offered include gaming, author events, cultural programming, children's programs, and computer classes taught in the English, Spanish, and Haitian Creole languages. Funding has been approved for the construction of two additional branches in Horizon West and Lake Nona.

The Alafaya branch has also been known as the Azalea Park branch (1965–1972), the Eastland branch (1972–1986), and the East Orange branch (1986–2000). The current branch location opened its doors on February 1, 2000. The Chickasaw branch opened on July 18, 2015, in east Orange County. The Eatonville Branch opened in January 2005. It honors the Eatonville resident Zora Neale Hurston.

Beginning as a bookmobile station in 1962, the Pine Hills branch expanded and relocated until 1990, when it relocated to the West Colonial Oaks Shopping Center and the name changed to the West Colonial Library. The West Colonial Library was renamed the Hiawassee branch and opened its current location in 2010. North Orange Branch is another branch that started off as a bookmobile station. Its first branch opened in 1964, moved to larger spaces in 1966 and 1969, and finally moved to its current location in Apopka in 1989.

=== South branches ===
South Branch originally opened as the South Orange branch in 1992; the South Creek branch moved in 2002 to a location in the Deerfield area. The South Trail Branch began as the Fort Gatlin branch in 1965. It moved and became the South Trail branch in 1981, then moved in 1996 to its current location on South Orange Blossom Trail. The Southeast Branch opened in January 1986 before moving in 1994 to its current location just a couple miles from the Orlando International Airport. The branch was a test site for new services, such as drive-up service windows and meeting rooms.

Dating back to 1924, the Washington Park Branch combines the former Booker T. Washington and Washington Shores Libraries. The Washington Shores branch, beginning as a library station in 1963, moved to the Episcopal Church of St. John the Baptist in 1965 and to the Southwest Boys Club in 1981. Windermere's library opened in 1959 to replace a book exchange located in John Luff's Country Store. The current branch, which was added in August 1991, is housed with a wrap-around porch located in the Town Square.

In the western part of Orange County, Winter Garden's first branch opened in November 1964 to replace a bookmobile station. Shortly after, the City of Winter Garden purchased two lots as the site of a future branch, which was dedicated on April 20, 1969. The current branch was built in 2005 and is the only branch built on donated land. The branch's official name, S.C. Battaglia Memorial Branch, honors the former citrus grove owner.

== Technology ==
Through its website, OCLS offers podcasts and video podcasts of storytelling and other library events, blogs, and LibGuides. The library system features free Wi-Fi access. All locations also house public computers with Internet access.

The library materials that are housed in self-checkout locations are given radio-frequency identification tags, which store information about the items and identify material at the point of checkout.

== Melrose Center ==
Through a gift from the Kendrick B. Melrose Family Foundation, the Library opened The Dorothy Lumley Melrose Center for Technology, Innovation and Creativity (Melrose Center). The center is named for Melrose's mother. It is located at 26,000 sq. ft. of space on the Orlando Public Library's second floor. The Melrose Center offers access to a simulation lab, conference room, and others. Some of the simulations offered include driving simulators, forklift simulators, and flying simulators. The center opened to the public on February 8, 2014.

Dorothy Lumley Melrose helped raise money to rebuild what is now the Orlando Public Library, taught at Memorial Middle School, and later in life became the first female stockbroker in the city. The $1 million from Melrose's family foundation is the largest single donation made to the Orange County Library System, which was named the Library of the Future in 2011 by the American Library Association.

== Awards ==
In 2017, the library received a Dollar General Literacy Foundation Award for $10,000 to expand its ESL classes. In June 2017, the library received a $25,000 grant for the Sunshine State Author Series from the Florida Department of State Division of Cultural Affairs.

In August 2018, the library was a recipient of the Disney grant for $50,000. In 2018, OCLS received a National Medal for Museum and Library Service from the Institute of Museum and Library Services. In May 2019, the library received the Betty Davis Miller Youth Services Award from the Florida Library Association. In 2021, the library received four awards from the Florida Library Association, including Library of the Year, Librarians Change People's Lives, Youth Services Award, and a Lifetime Achievement Award for director Mary Anne Hodel.

== Special collections ==
OCLS curates three special collections housed on the fourth floor of the Orlando Public Library. These special collections are open to the public.

- The Florida Collection, which preserves Floridiana.
- The Disney Collection, which focuses on the history, films, and theme parks of The Walt Disney Company.
- The Microfilm Collection, containing microfilm versions of Orlando area newspapers and several major U.S. newspapers. Microfilm readers are provided and copies can be made for a small fee.

== Elimination of overdue fines ==
In October 2022, Orange County Library System staff members presented the board of trustees with a recommendation to eliminate fines on overdue materials. Library Director Steve Powell noted that other library systems throughout the country that have abolished fines have seen an increase in returned overdue items and an increase in library usage. The motion carried 4–0.

Effective on October 16, the Orange County Library System stopped collecting fines on overdue materials. This decision was made in preparation for the Orange County Library System's 100-year anniversary in 2023.

== See also ==
- List of libraries
- University of Central Florida Libraries
