= Noemi Pinilla-Alonso =

Spanish astronomer

Noemí Pinilla-Alonso (born in Oviedo, Asturias, Spain) is a Spanish planetary scientist and researcher at the University of Oviedo, where she is a member of the Institute for Space Sciences and Technology in Asturias (ICTEA). Her research focuses on the origin and evolution of the Solar System through the study of small bodies using ground- and space-based telescopes. She is the principal investigator of the James Webb Space Telescope program DiSCo-TNOs, dedicated to exploring the surface composition of trans-Neptunian objects.

== Early career ==
From 2000 to 2008, she worked at the Roque de los Muchachos Observatory (La Palma). Initially, she was responsible for the calibration of an automated system measuring infrared sky quality based on GPS technology.

== Florida Space Institute, University of Central Florida ==
In 2015, after a research stay at the Observatório do Valongo in Rio de Janeiro, Brazil, Pinilla-Alonso joined the Florida Space Institute (FSI) as a visiting researcher. In 2016, she was appointed Associate Research Scientist in Planetary Sciences and later became Research Professor, a position she combined with an appointment as Associate Scientist in the Department of Physics at the University of Central Florida (UCF)

When UCF assumed management of the Arecibo Observatory in 2017, Pinilla-Alonso joined its leadership team. From 2017 until the observatory’s closure in 2023, she served as Deputy Principal Scientist, promoting integration between Arecibo’s research community and UCF’s academic environment, and advocating for the observatory within the radio astronomy, planetary science, and atmospheric science communities. Between December 2018 and April 2021, she also held the position of Chief Scientist, facilitating the redefinition of Arecibo’s scientific program.

== Research on the origin and evolution of the solar system ==
Pinilla-Alonso’s work seeks to understand the formation and evolution of the Solar System by combining spectroscopic observations and light-scattering models to study complex icy and rocky surfaces. Her research includes the surface characterization of dwarf planets such as Eris, Makemake, and particularly Haumea and its collisional family. She is co-leader of the PRIMASS survey, which provides visible and near-infrared spectra for over 600 primitive asteroids shared with the community as PRIMASS-Library. She has also contributed to support major space missions such as NASA’s New Horizons, OSIRIS-REx, Lucy, and JAXA’s Hayabusa2 by coordinating observations campaigns to provide detailed characterization of their targets.

== Surface Composition of trans-neptunian objects ==
Since 2021, Pinilla-Alonso has led DiSCo (Discovering the Composition of Trans-Neptunian Objects), one of the James Webb Space Telescope’s early large programs. With nearly 100 hours of observing time, DiSCo collects infrared spectra (0.8–5.2 μm) of about 60 Centaurs and trans-Neptunian objects, unveiling for the first time the intricate mixture of ices and dust that defines the outer Solar System. The program also established a compositional taxonomy for trans-Neptunian objects, linking their spectral slopes and absorption features to differences in surface composition and evolutionary history. Beyond characterizing TNO surfaces, DiSCo provides a window into the primordial building blocks of icy worlds. It links the chemical and physical processes shaping our Solar System to those operating in exoplanetary systems, offering insights into planetary formation and evolution on a universal scale.

== Universidad de Oviedo ==
In 2025, Noemí Pinilla-Alonso returned to the University of Oviedo after receiving an ATRAE fellowship.

== Awards and recognition ==
- 2025 – El Comercio Science Award
- 2025 – Invited keynote speaker at the Solemn Ceremony of Saint Thomas Aquino, University of Oviedo
- 2022 – Major Deming Orange County Distinguished Resident Award for exemplifying collaboration, innovation, and inclusion
- 2021 – LIFE–UCF Women Faculty Recognition Award for impact on students and campus community
- 2019 – UCF Luminary Award for fostering major research collaborations at FSI, CLASS, and Arecibo Observatory
- 2018 – Asturian of the Month (La Nueva España, May 2018)
- 2017 – Asteroid 10689 pinillaalonso, named in her honor by the International Astronomical Union
