= University of Florida Architecture and Fine Arts Library =

Coordinates: 29.650614°N 82.341520°W

Architecture and Fine Arts Library
- Type: Public
- Established: 1965
- Location: Gainesville, Florida, USA
- Website: Architecture and Fine Arts Library

The University of Florida Architecture and Fine Arts (AFA) Library is a departmental library of the University of Florida located in Gainesville, Florida, that is administered by the university's George A. Smathers Libraries system. The AFA Library hosts the university's extensive collections in architecture, art history, building construction, interior design, landscape architecture, urban and regional planning, studio art, museology (museum science), and historic preservation.
