= Lake Nona, Orlando, Florida =

Lake Nona, Florida
- Planned community
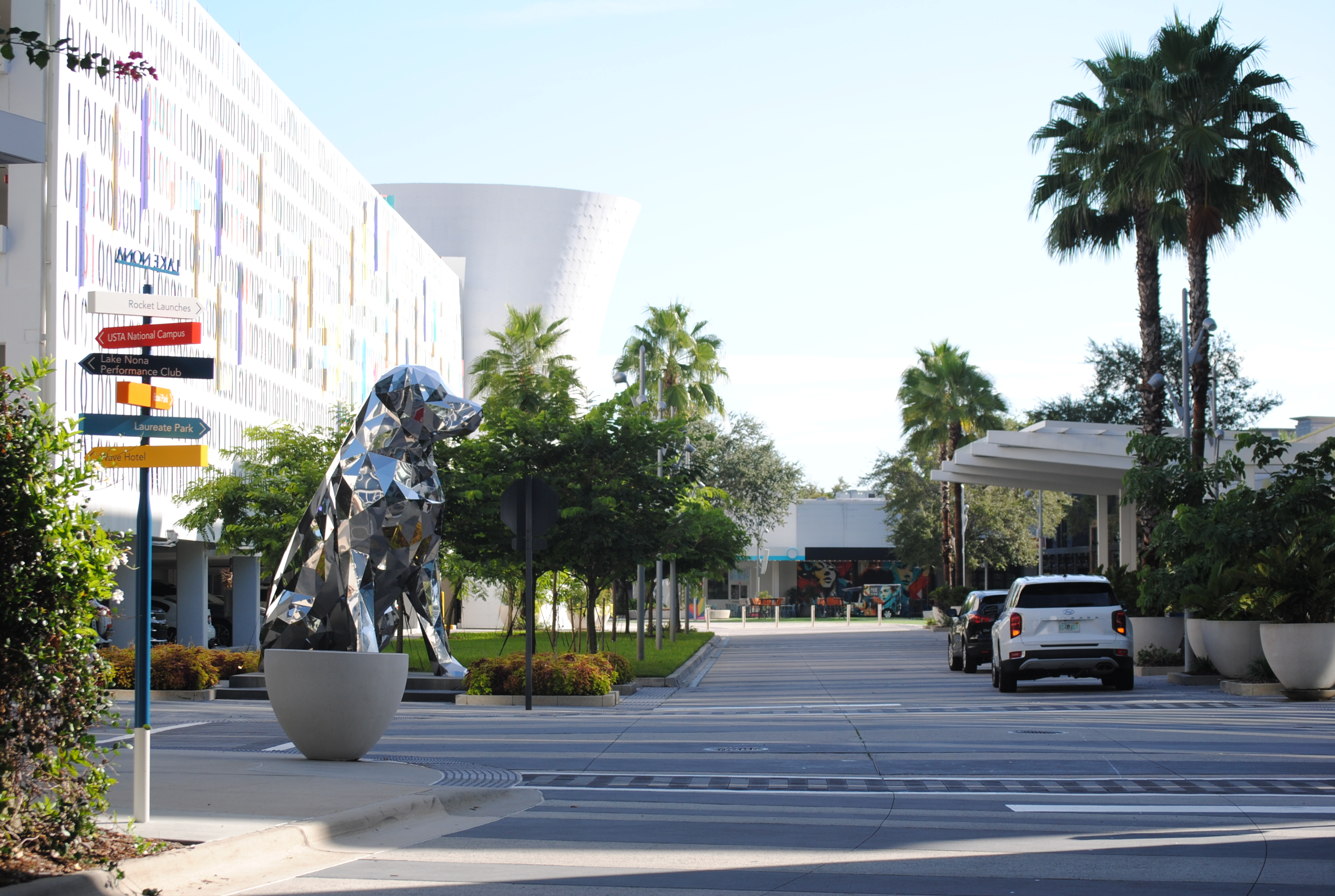
- Lake Nona Town Center, looking northeast
- Interactive map of Lake Nona, Florida
- Coordinates: 28°22′54″N 81°15′47″W
- Country: United States
- State: Florida
- County: Orange

Area
  - Total: 17 sq mi (44 km^{2})

Population (2018)
  - Total: 64,000
  - Density: 3,800/sq mi (1,500/km^{2})
- Time zone: UTC-5 (Eastern (EST))
  - Summer (DST): UTC-4 (EDT)
- ZIP codes: 32827 & 32824
- Area codes: 321 & 407 & 689
- Major State Routes: link = Florida State Road 417
- Website: http://www.lakenona.com/

Lake Nona is a 17-square-mile (11,000-acre; 44 km^{2}; 4,400 ha) mixed-use planned community within the city limits of Orlando, southeast of Orlando International Airport.

The community is named for a large lake in the northern part.

== Demographics ==
The population of Lake Nona has grown from 1,500 in 2000 to over 50,000 people in 2015.

== Education ==
Lake Nona Medical City contains several centers for biomedical research and education including the University of Central Florida College of Medicine and the site of the planned relocation of the College of Nursing, as well as the addition of the University of Central Florida College of Dental Medicine, and the University of Florida College of Pharmacy, which is ranked #5 among all pharmacy schools in the nation. Several other private, governmental, and educational medical centers are located in the area as well.

== Neighborhoods ==
The city of Orlando has officially divided Lake Nona into four neighborhoods:

- Lake Nona Central, including VillageWalk at Lake Nona and the USTA National Campus
- Lake Nona Estates, including the Lake Nona Golf & Country Club
- Lake Nona South, including the Medical City and Laureate Park residential development
- Northlake Park at Lake Nona, which includes the separate developments of Morningside at Lake Nona and Waters Edge at Lake Nona

A fifth neighborhood, Education Village (formerly Narcoossee Groves), lies outside the original borders of Lake Nona. Lake Nona High School and the Valencia College Lake Nona Campus are located here.
