= Lake Nona Medical City =

- Neighborhood
- Lake Nona, Orlando, Florida
- Location of Orlando in Orange County and the state of Florida

- Location within the contiguous United States of America
- Coordinates: 28°22′2″N 81°16′49″W
- Country: United States
- State: Florida
- County: Orange
- City: Orlando
- Founded: October 2005; 21 years ago
- Opened: August 2010; 16 years ago

Area
  - Total: 1.0 sq mi (2.6 km^{2})
- Elevation: 82 ft (25 m)
- Time zone: UTC−5 (EST)
  - Summer (DST): UTC−4 (EDT)
- ZIP code(s): 32827
- Area codes: 321, 407, 689
- Website: Official site

Lake Nona Medical City is a 650-acre (260 ha) health and life sciences park in Orlando, Florida, United States. It is located near Orlando International Airport and within the master-planned community of Lake Nona. The city is home to the University of Central Florida's Health Sciences Campus, which includes the university's College of Medicine and Burnett School of Biomedical Sciences. In the future, the campus will also house UCF's College of Nursing, College of Dental Medicine, and a teaching hospital.

The medical city also includes the Sanford-Burnham Medical Research Institute, Nemours Children's Hospital, University of Florida College of Pharmacy, which is ranked #5 among all pharmacy schools in the nation, and Valencia College at Lake Nona. In addition, the Orlando Veterans Administration Medical Center, began seeing clinical patients from February 2015.

== History ==
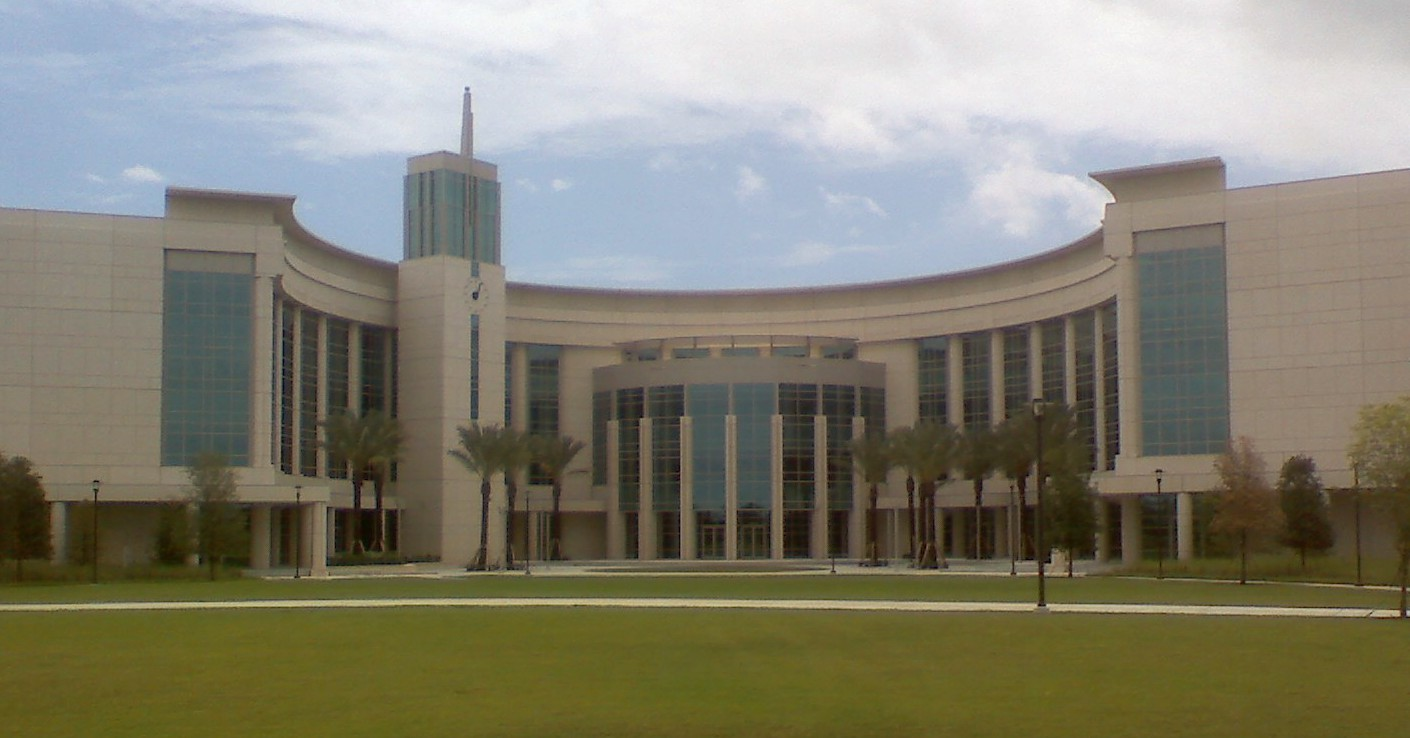
UCF College of Medicine at Lake Nona

The concept of the medical city began in October 2005 when the Tavistock Group donated $12.5 million and 50 acres (20 ha) of land to the University of Central Florida to help establish a medical school. In March 2006, the Florida Board of Governors voted to approve UCF's proposal to build a medical college at Lake Nona, and the school greeted its first students in fall 2009. In 2012, UCF purchased an additional 25 acres (10 ha) of land at Lake Nona to construct a teaching hospital.

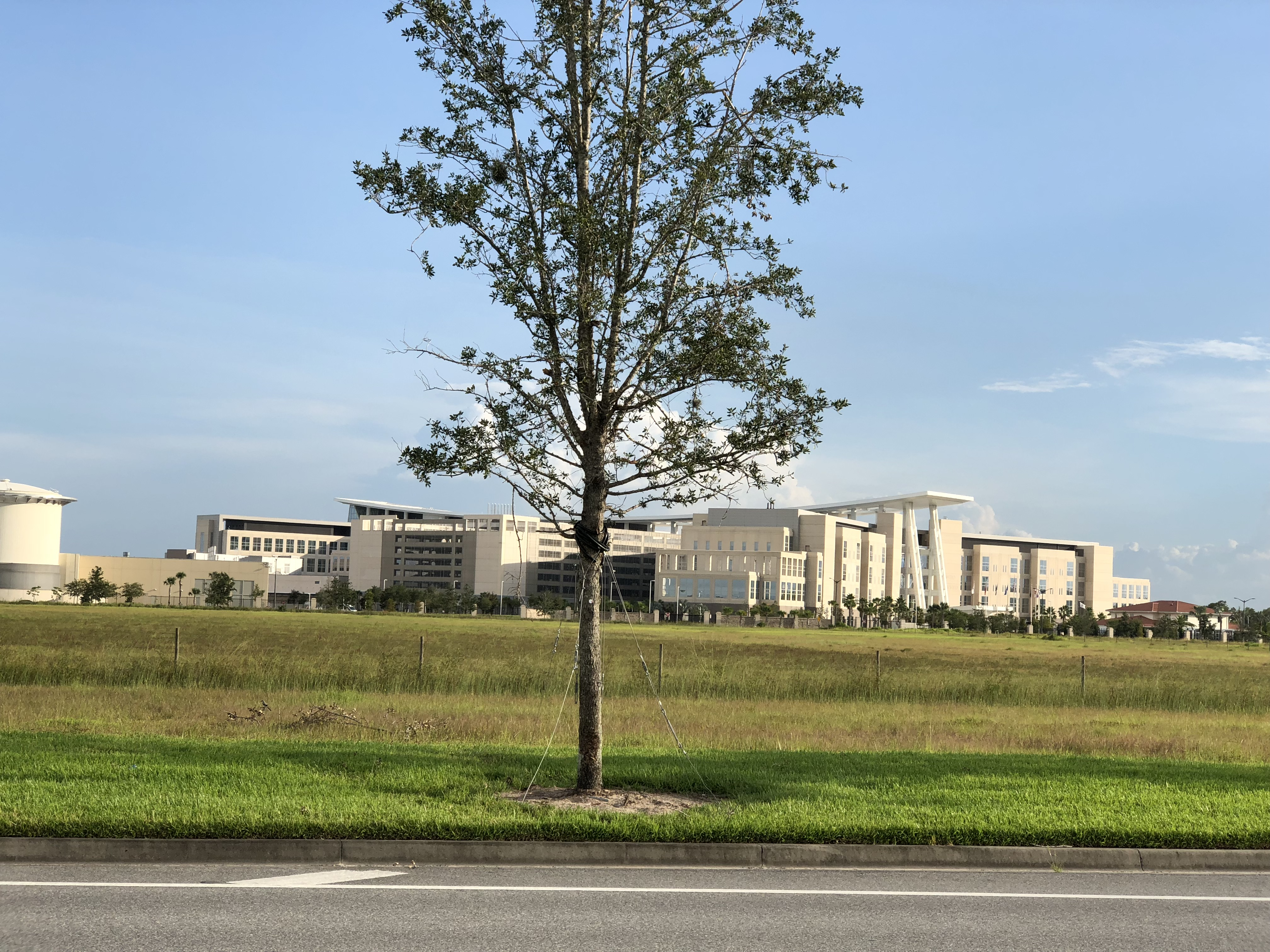
Orlando VA Medical Center

== Development ==
The medical city is surrounded by education facilities, five million square feet of commercial and retail space, and a mix of residential options. Upon completion of construction of the various projects, UCF's Health Science Campus will accommodate as many as 5,000 upper division, professional, and graduate students and faculty members in the health-related programs, and include up to two million square feet of research and instruction space. It is estimated that the medical city will create up to 30,000 jobs and have a $7.6 billion impact on the economy over the next decade.

Lake Nona is a 7,000-acre (2,800 ha) master-planned community. Forty percent of the community has been reserved for open green space and lakes. Lake Nona's amenities include a planned 334-acre (135 ha) city park, 44 miles of planned trails, a number of community parks and 1,000-acre (400 ha) of lakes and waterways.
