= Rosen College of Hospitality Management =

College in Orlando, Florida, US

Coordinates: 28.428996°N 81.441672°W

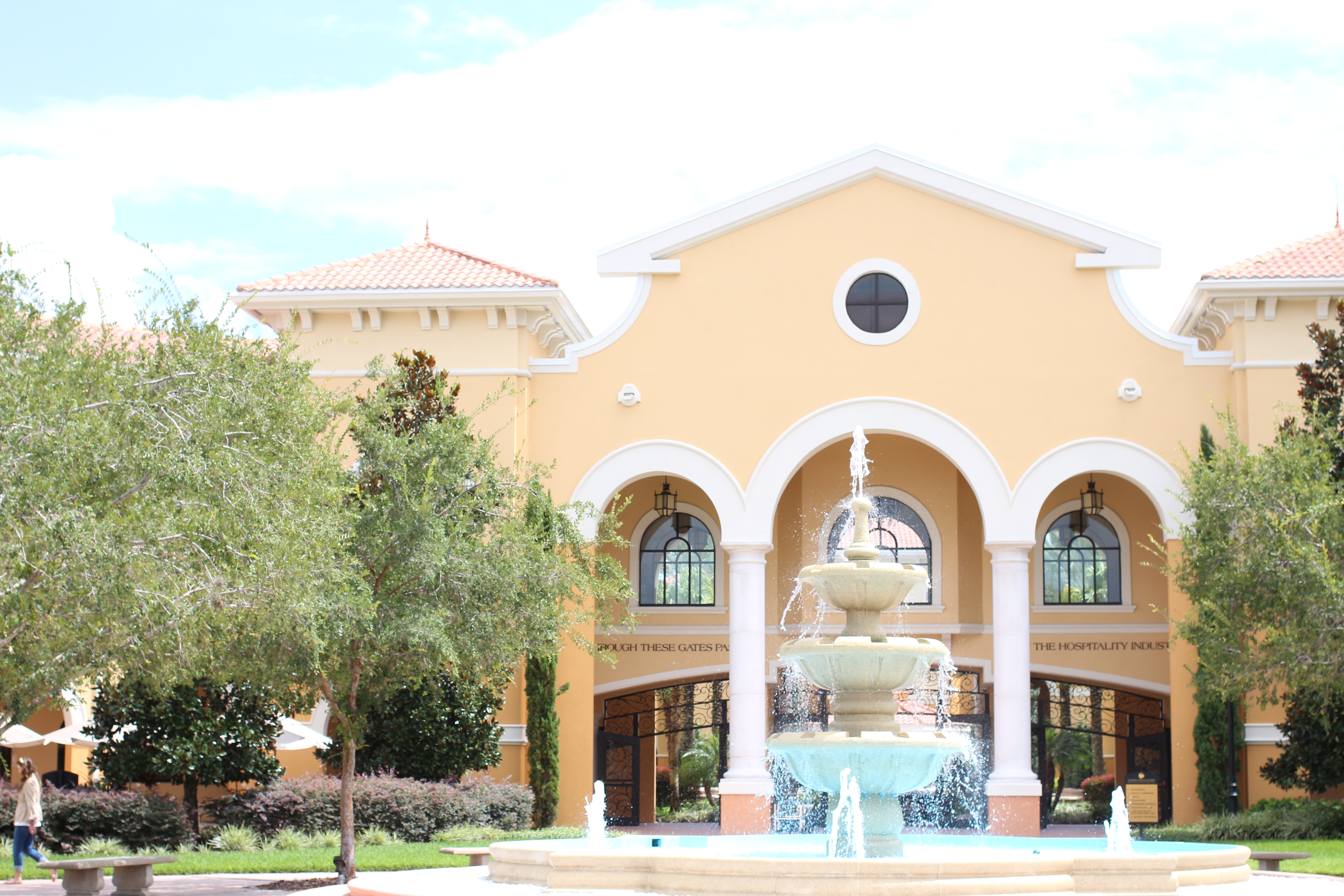
- Type: Public
- Established: 1983; 43 years ago
- Dean: Mejia, Cynthia, Ph.D
- Undergraduates: 2,816
- Postgraduates: 118
- Location: Orlando, Florida, United States
- Campus: Urban 20 acres (0.081 km^{2})
- Website: hospitality.ucf.edu

The Rosen College of Hospitality Management is an academic college of the University of Central Florida located in Orlando, Florida, United States.

== History ==
UCF offered its first program in Hospitality Management in 1983. The program was the outgrowth of UCF's Dick Pope Sr. Institute for Tourism Studies, which began in 1979. Dr. Abraham Pizam led the department from its founding in 1983 to 1993. Dr. Robert Ford served as department chair from 1993 to 1998. Dr. Pizam returned in 1998 and after 17 years stepped down in 2018. Dr. Youcheng Wang was selected as the new Dean in 2018 and served until stepping down in October of 2023. Following his departure, Dr. Cynthia Mejia was selected to serve as interim dean in October of 2023.

Despite being based in Orlando – one of the world's premier tourist destinations – the program had difficulty getting started, being realigned several times: originally it was aligned under the College of Business, then it would become an independent program, then it would lose independent status and be aligned under the College of Health and Professional Studies, then realigned once again under the College of Business. The difficulties with the program led to a 1998 Orlando Sentinel article, which bluntly criticized UCF's administration for its "less-than-stellar hospitality program" (and for allowing the Pope Institute to dwindle to nearly nothing, courtesy of drastically-reduced state funding).

Whether intentional or not, the Sentinel article served as a catalyst for improvements. A $250,000 donation led to new and unique study tracks in Vacation Ownership Resort Management and Theme Park & Attraction Management. The turning point would come in 2000 when Harris Rosen, owner of Orlando-based Rosen Hotels & Resorts and long-time supporter of the university, donated $10 million in cash and 25 acres in land (valued at $8 million), along with an additional $1.1 million in cash for scholarships, to the program. The donation spurred others (among them an $18 million matching gift from the State of Florida and $5 million from the Orange County Convention and Visitors Bureau), and the program would once again become an independent school (named Rosen School of Hospitality Management after its major benefactor), with Dr. Pizam being named Interim Dean.

The new campus would open in January 2004, with the School being elevated to College status in May of that year.

== Academic programs ==
The Rosen College of Hospitality Management offers five undergraduate degrees, three graduate degrees, and a doctoral degree, along with seven undergraduate certificates and five graduate certificates.

=== Undergraduate degrees ===
All Rosen College undergraduate programs confer the Bachelor of Science (BS) degree upon successful graduation.

- Hospitality Management, both general and with the following specialized tracks:
  - Lodging Management (beginning Fall 2016 semester)
  - Theme Park and Attraction Management
  - Hospitality Information Technology
- Restaurant and Foodservice Management
- Event Management (the first of its kind in the United States)
- Entertainment Management (a joint program with the University of Central Florida College of Arts and Humanities)
- Theme Park and Attraction Management

Along with mandatory curriculum requirements, in order for a Rosen student to gain real-world experience in the hospitality industry, all Rosen undergraduate programs require the student to complete three paid internships over three separate semesters. Each semester's internship must consist of at least 16 hours work per week and must be paid at no less than minimum wage.

In addition, the College offers undergraduate minors in Hospitality Management and Event Management; the minors are open to all UCF students except Rosen College majors.

=== Graduate degrees ===
The College offers the following graduate degrees:

- Master of Science in Hospitality and Tourism Management (both thesis and non-thesis options are available)
  - In addition to the regular M.S. degree, the College also offers a unique track for MD students; they will "witness and experience adoptable elements to effect a cultural change in the practice of medicine vis-a-vis the concept of hospitality and service-oriented business models."
- PhD in Hospitality Management, the only Hospitality Management doctoral degree in the State of Florida (Rosen awarded its first two Hospitality Management PhD degrees in May 2016)

Previously, Rosen offered a PhD in Hospitality Education (as a joint degree with the University of Central Florida College of Education); this option was ended and replaced by the Hospitality Management PhD.

=== Graduate certificates ===
The College offers the following graduate certificates:

- Leadership & Strategy in Hospitality & Tourism
- Financial Management for the Hospitality & Tourism Industry
- Destination Marketing & Management
- Event Management
- Hospitality & Tourism Technologies

The Certificate programs (which are fully on-line) consist of three, three-hour graduate-level courses; the courses do not have prerequisites but are offered only during a specific semester (Fall, Spring, or Summer), so a student may enroll at any semester and take the specific course offered at that time. The credits earned from the courses taken can be applied (at three hours per course) toward a future master's degree.

== Reputation ==
According to Academic Ranking of World Universities Rosen's hospitality program ranked No. 1 in the nation and No. 2 in the world in 2022. Rosen College is also the youngest hospitality school ranked in the top five.

Due to the campus's proximity to Orlando's tourism sector, both Disney and Universal have a longstanding history of hiring interns from the college.

== Campus ==
The Rosen College campus is located adjacent to the Rosen Shingle Creek Resort, and near the Orange County Convention Center, not far from International Drive. The campus itself is designed to imitate a resort-style feel, with Spanish-inspired architecture and landscaping. Various areas of the college are dedicated in name to major donors to the college (e.g. Disney Dining Room, Universal Orlando Library, Darden Auditorium, and the Anheuser Busch Beer & Wine Lab).

Regular Shuttle service is offered on most days classes are held to and from the UCF Main Campus. Shuttle service is also offered to the UCF Main Campus for Rosen Students during major campus functions such as when the UCF Knights Football team are playing at home in FBC Mortgage Stadium, also known as the Bounce House.

=== Student life ===
The college features an on-site Campus Life Office that coordinates on-campus activities and events in conjunction with the UCF Student Government Association. The college offers a variety of student organizations including associations such as Eta Sigma Delta (International Hospitality Management Honor Society), National Society of Minorities in Hospitality, the Professional Convention Management Association, and the National Association of Catering Executives. The college is also home to the only college chapter of the Future Theme Park Leaders Association. The Career Services Office also offers career development events.

=== Housing ===
In 2005 the University opened two on-campus housing buildings, able to hold 400 residents and 8 resident assistants (one per floor). The student apartment community includes an outdoor pool, community center, outdoor grill area, and key-card only access into the building. The campus is under the law enforcement jurisdiction of the UCF Police Department which provides 24-hour security for the campus including the apartment community.

=== Library ===
In 2004, the Universal Orlando Foundation Library at Rosen College was opened along with the new Rosen College Campus. The library was named after Universal Orlando due to a donation of money and materials at the time of its construction. The Rosen Library holds materials relating to the hospitality industry, including the areas of event management, golf and club management, lodging management, restaurant management, theme park management, and tourism management. The Rosen Library also offers multimedia related to the previously mentioned areas of study and technology for its patrons to use. The Rosen Library is also one of seven libraries in the United States which holds the status as a United Nations World Tourism Organization depository and carries UNWTO materials in English, French, Russian, and Spanish.
