= Institute for Economic Competitiveness =

Economic research institute at UCF

Institute for Economic Forecasting
- Motto: "Nationally Recognized, Locally Focused"
- Type: Research Institute
- Established: 1998; 28 years ago
- Director: Dr. Sean Snaith
- Location: Orlando, Florida, United States
- Website: Official Site

The UCF Institute for Economic Forecasting (IEF) is an economic research institute of the College of Business Administration at the University of Central Florida located in Orlando, Florida, United States. The director of the institute is Dr.Sean Snaith.

The Institute publishes economic forecasts every quarter for the U.S. and Florida metropolitan areas, as well as providing analysis of the economic impact of current events, such as the 2008 recession and the Deepwater Horizon oil spill.

== Faculty ==
Sean Snaith is the current director of the Institute for Economic Forecasting within the College of Business Administration at the University of Central Florida and a widely recognized economist in the field of business and economic forecasting.

A forecaster, researcher, and professor, Snaith has served as a consultant for local and regional municipalities to multi-national corporations, such as Compaq, Dell and IBM. He has held teaching positions at Pennsylvania State University, American University in Cairo, University of North Dakota and University of the Pacific.

== Economic forecasts and research ==
New economic forecasts are produced and distributed by the Institute every quarter. Each edition provides updated economic information that is vital to the academic, government and business communities. The Institute serves as a single point of contact between commerce and government with economic information resources.

Each year the Institute releases multiple economic reports, with the reports falling into two overall categories. One forecast focuses on the United States and the other focuses on the Florida and its metropolitan areas. U.S. Forecast includes analysis and predictions on GDP, consumer spending, government spending, investments, net exports and unemployment. Forecast information has been featured in the USA Today Survey of Top Economists, Livingston Survey, Survey of Professional Forecasters, Reuters, and Bloomberg monthly surveys. In addition to the U.S. Forecast, the institute prepares a comprehensive, quarterly forecast of the Florida economy and 12 metropolitan areas. Metropolitan areas covered by the forecast include: Pensacola, Tallahassee, Jacksonville, Gainesville, Ocala, Deltona-Daytona Beach, Tampa-St. Petersburg, Lakeland, Orlando-Kissimmee, Palm Bay-Melbourne, Naples-Marco Island, and Miami-Fort Lauderdale.

=== Research in the media ===
University and Institute research has appeared in the New York Times, Forbes, U.S. News & World Report, Parenting Magazine and on ABC World News, CBS Evening News and National Public Radio. In addition, the institute's director and forecasts have appeared on national television, including CNN and MSNBC, and have been included in notable publications, such as Reuters, Bloomberg BusinessWeek, The Miami Herald, and The Palm Beach Post.

== Special projects ==
=== Metro Orlando cleantech report - October 2009 ===
Commissioned by Orange County Mayor Richard T. Crotty, this study assesses Metro Orlando's Assets, Capabilities, and Potential in the cleantech industry. In this report, the Institute highlights the evolution of the cleantech industry and studies the six major cleantech areas of opportunity for the region, based on the institute's research. The report also highlights the existing cleantech clusters and initiatives; Metro Orlando's current strengths, including its natural resources, educational institutions, supporting organizations; the Metro Orlando cleantech industry; its potential for growth, including the region's economic strengths, the leadership, its R&D capabilities, and its strong technology base. Finally, the report shares the findings of the survey and makes recommendations on the best course of action in the near or medium future, including the policies that could benefit the region.
