= Valencia College =

Public college in Orlando, Florida, U.S.

- Former names: Valencia Junior College (1968–1971); Valencia Community College (1971–2010)
- Type: Public college
- Established: 1968; 58 years ago
- Parent institution: Florida College System
- Accreditation: SACS
- Endowment: $88.7 million (2024)
- Budget: $273 million (2024)
- President: Kathleen Plinske
- Academic staff: 638 (full-time); 1413 (part-time)
- Undergraduates: 43,370 (fall 2022)
- Location: Orlando, Florida, U.S. 28.5227°N 81.4653°W
- Campus: Large city
- Colors: Red, yellow, black, and gray
- Nickname: Pumas
- Website: www.valenciacollege.edu

Valencia College (VC) is a public college with its main campus in Orlando, Florida, United States. Established in 1968, it is a member of the Florida College System and is accredited by the Southern Association of Colleges and Schools to offer associate and bachelor's degrees, as well as several vocational certificates.

Valencia operates multiple campuses across Orange and Osceola counties. It collaborates with local schools and businesses and participates in community programs and initiatives to support academic and career development.

== History ==
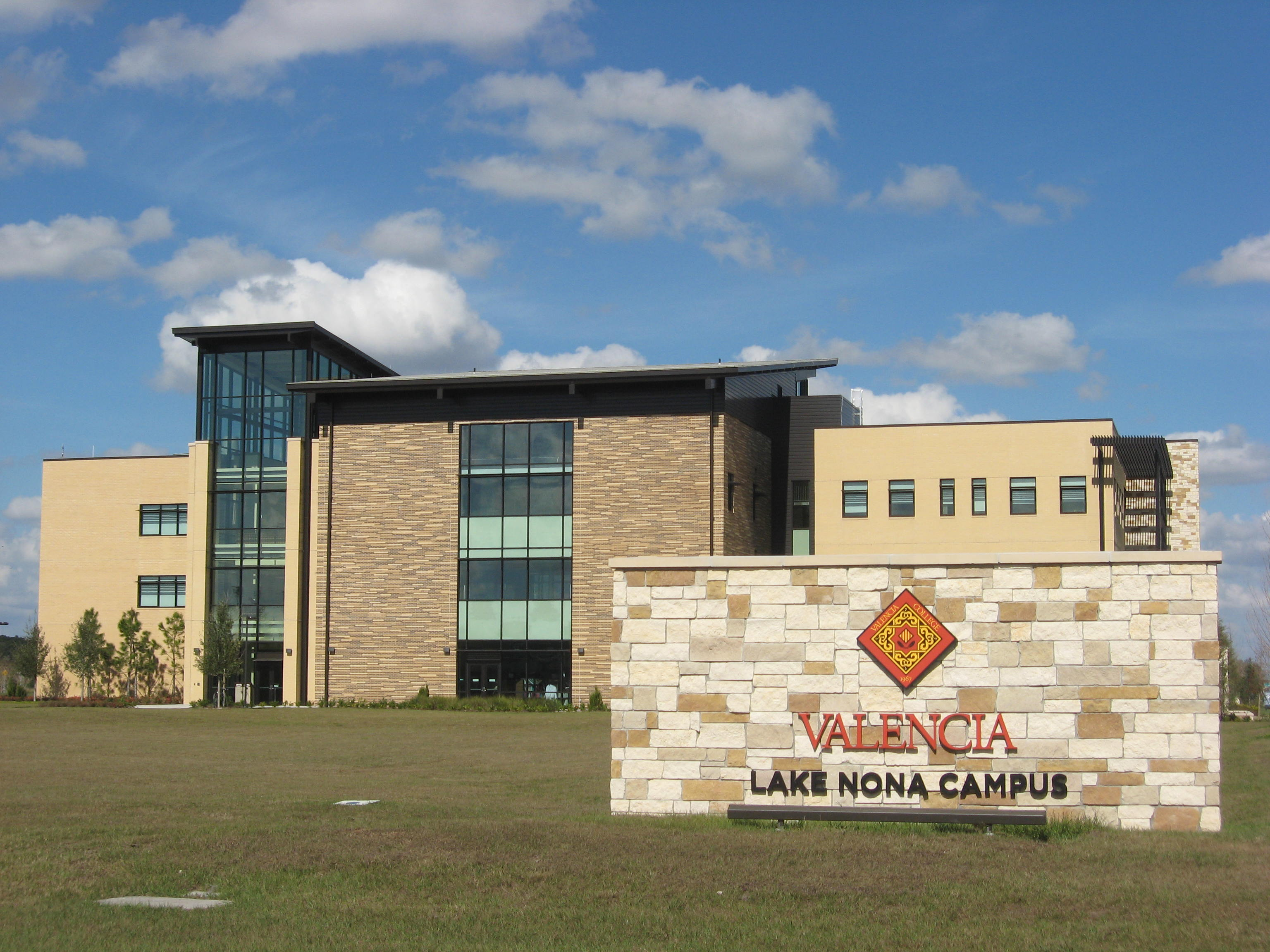
Lake Nona campus

The college was established in February 1968 as Valencia Junior College by the Orange County Board of Public Instruction and the Florida State Board of Education, under authority from the 1961 Florida Legislature. In July 1968, the College Advisory Committee was reconstituted as the Valencia Junior College Board of Trustees, replacing the Orange County Board of Public Instruction as the governing body. Classes began in the fall of 1968 in temporary facilities on West Oak Ridge Road in Orlando. In 1971, the college was renamed Valencia Community College and moved to a larger, permanent site on South Kirkman Road, known as the "West campus."

To accommodate growing demand, Valencia Community College expanded by opening additional campuses: the East campus in 1975, the Osceola campus in Kissimmee in 1997, and the Winter Park campus in 1998.

In the 2000s, Valencia established numerous partnerships to enhance academic and economic development. Notable initiatives include the opening of the Walt Disney World Center for Hospitality and Culinary Arts in 2002, the launch of the Criminal Justice Institute in 2004, and the initiation of the "DirectConnect to UCF" program in 2006, which guarantees Valencia graduates admission to the University of Central Florida. Other partnerships included the Horizon Scholars Program with Orange County Public Schools in 2008, the Photonics Academy at Wekiva High School in 2009, and a training program for the Transportation Security Administration at Orlando International Airport in 2010. The college also collaborated with companies like Lockheed Martin and Universal Studios Florida.

In July 2011, the college was renamed "Valencia College" and began offering bachelor's degrees, with new programs in radiologic and imaging sciences and electrical and computer engineering technology. The same year, it received the Aspen Prize for Community College Excellence, recognizing its achievements in graduation rates, job placement, and innovative programs. Since then, the college has continued to expand its facilities and programs to meet community needs, opening the Lake Nona campus in 2012, the Poinciana campus in 2017, and the Downtown campus in partnership with the University of Central Florida. The Advanced Manufacturing Training Center was launched in Kissimmee in 2016, followed by additional Centers for Accelerated Training at the Poinciana and Downtown campuses. In 2019, the college inaugurated a new Center for Accelerated Training and Careers in Industry and Technology at the Osceola campus and celebrated its 50th commencement ceremony. In 2021, Valencia College opened its largest center for accelerated training to date, the Valencia College Heart of Florida United Way Center for Accelerated Training in northwest Orlando.

== Campuses ==
Valencia College operates multiple campuses across Central Florida, each offering a range of programs and facilities tailored to their respective communities:

West Campus, the college's first permanent campus, opened in 1971. Located on a 180-acre site in western Orange County, it is known for its high-tech programs in engineering, architecture, mathematics, and health sciences. The campus features modern LEED-certified green buildings and supports degree programs from the University of Central Florida (UCF).

East Campus began operations in 1975 and is situated at 701 North Econlockhatchee Trail in eastern Orange County. Serving approximately 21,000 students annually, it houses the School of Arts and Entertainment and provides general education courses and an Associate in Arts degree. The campus also includes computer and science labs and is located near the Little Econlockhatchee River, close to UCF.

Osceola Campus, opened in 1997, is located on U.S. Highway 192 in Kissimmee. It is equipped with advanced training technologies, including labs for biology, chemistry, and physics, and boasts the largest library among Valencia's campuses. The campus features a green screen for video presentations and offers UCF bachelor's programs on-site.

Winter Park Campus, established in 1998, is located at the corner of Morse Boulevard and Denning Drive in Winter Park. It provides facilities such as computer labs, a biology lab, and a library. The campus is home to the Jeffersonian Honors Program, which focuses on developing global citizens, and is noted for its picturesque setting and community engagement.

Lake Nona Campus, opened in 2012, is part of Lake Nona Medical City and focuses on careers in medicine and biotechnology. It includes 18 classrooms, two computer labs, and six science labs. This campus is connected with Lake Nona High School, allowing students to earn both a high school diploma and a degree from Valencia College. Facilities also include a library, tutoring services, and a café.

Poinciana Campus, which began operations in 2017, is located at 3255 Pleasant Hill Road in Kissimmee. It features 12 classrooms, a science lab, a computer lab, a culinary teaching kitchen, and various support services. The campus offers accelerated skills training programs designed to quickly equip residents with skills for higher-wage careers.

Downtown Campus, opened in 2019, is situated in downtown Orlando and is unique for having on-campus housing. It is a collaborative site with UCF and offers a variety of programs, certificates, and training opportunities. The campus facilitates a smooth transition into careers or further studies at UCF through the "DirectConnect to UCF" program.

== Academics ==
Valencia College offers associate in arts (A.A.), associate of science (A.S.), and bachelor's degrees. It also offers specialized training, professional certifications, and continuing education opportunities.

== Student life ==
Valencia offers over 100 clubs and organizations, encompassing academic, cultural, recreational, and service-oriented groups, providing various opportunities for student involvement. The Student Government Association (SGA) is responsible for representing student interests, participating in campus governance, and organizing events that contribute to campus life. The Honors Program offers advanced coursework, special seminars, and research opportunities aimed at supporting high-achieving students in their academic and professional pursuits.

Valencia does not have a formal athletics program but provides intramural sports as a means for students to engage in physical activities and foster community involvement.

International students are supported by the International Student Services office, which offers assistance with cultural adaptation, social activities, and visa and immigration issues.

On-campus housing is available at the Downtown campus in Orlando, which includes residence halls and apartments. The college prioritizes campus safety with established protocols and emergency services, and offers transportation options such as public transit and parking facilities to assist with commuting.

== Notable alumni ==
- Dick Batchelor, politician and businessperson
- Rich Crotty, politician
- Howie Dorough, musician
- Maxwell Frost, politician and activist (did not graduate)
- Scott Fletcher, professional baseball player
- Gregg Hale, filmmaker and producer
- Chris Kirkpatrick, musician
- Dave Martinez, professional baseball manager
- Ben Saunders, professional mixed martial artist
- Scott Stapp, musician
- Chase Stokes, actor
- Al Weiss, businessperson
