= Center for Advanced Turbomachinery and Energy Research =

Academic research group in Orlando, Florida

- Type: Public
- Director: Jay Kapat, Sc.D.
- Academic staff: 10
- Location: Orlando, Florida, United States
- Website: Official Site

The Center for Advanced Turbomachinery and Energy Research is an academic research group of the University of Central Florida located in Orlando, Florida, United States. The research conducted here covers several branches of engineering, dedicated to the study of: propulsion, turbine, combustion, and Energy transformation. Corporate partners include Siemens, GE, Alstom, Aerojet Rocketdyne, Embraer, and others.
