= University of Central Florida College of Nursing =

Public college in Orlando, Florida, US

College of Nursing
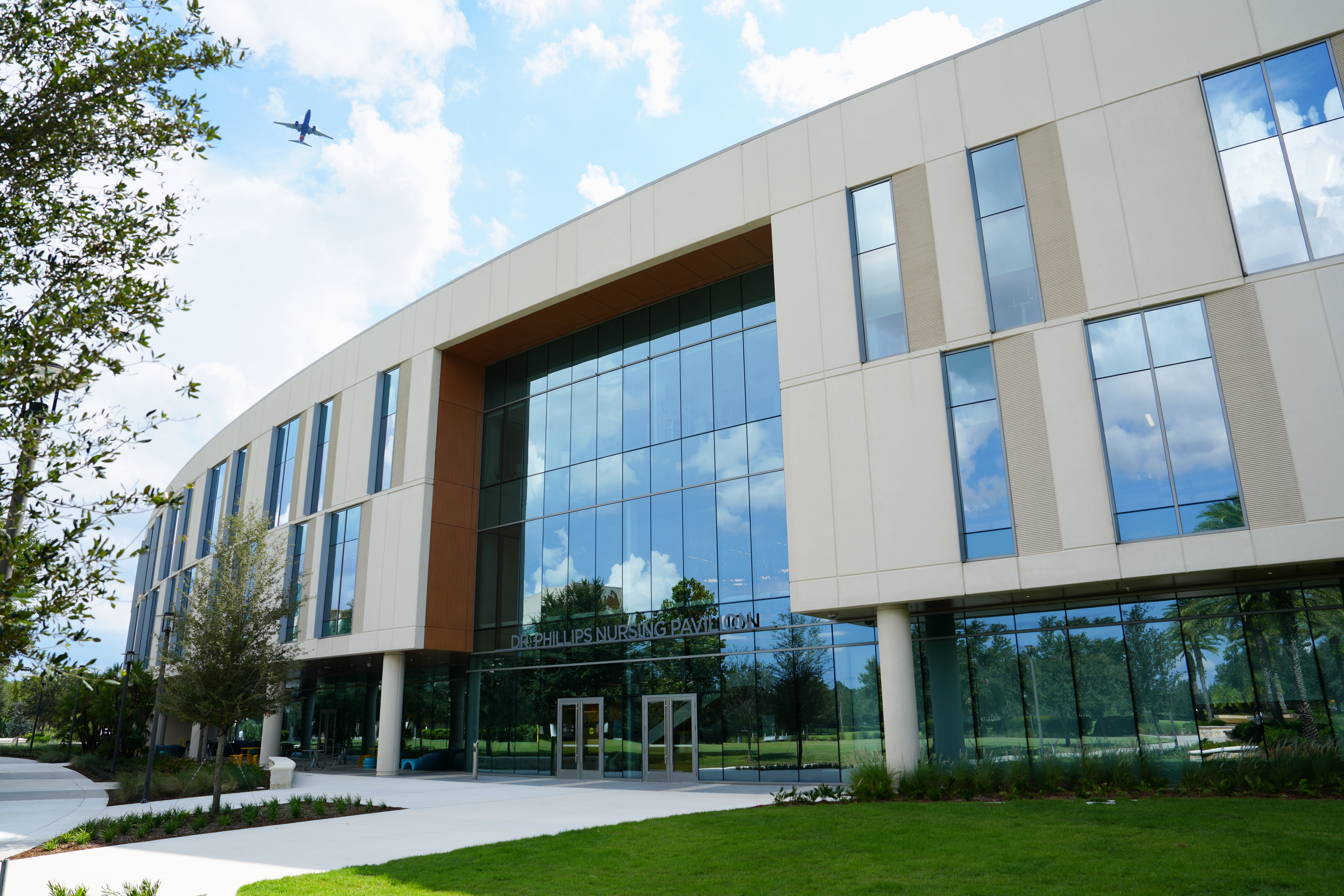
- Dr. Phillips Nursing Pavilion on UCF's Academic Health Sciences Campus in Lake Nona’s Medical City
- Type: Public
- Established: 1978; 48 years ago
- Dean: Sharon Tucker
- Undergraduates: 2,274
- Postgraduates: 448
- Location: Orlando, Florida, U.S. 28°22′08″N 81°16′51″W
- Website: www.nursing.ucf.edu

The University of Central Florida College of Nursing is an academic college of the University of Central Florida located in Orlando, Florida, United States. The dean of the college is Sharon J. Tucker, PhD, RN, PMHCNS-BC, EBP-C, FNAP, FAAN.

According to U.S. News & World Report, UCF is among the most innovative college programs, with one of the best online graduate nursing programs in the state of Florida and among the top 25 programs for Veterans.

== History ==
The Nursing Program at UCF was established in 1978, with the first class of undergraduate students enrolling in the fall of 1979. The inaugural class graduated in 1981 with their BSN degree. In 1982, the Nursing program received the designation, Department of Nursing. A satellite campus was opened at Cocoa in 1983.

In 1986, the Department of Nursing moved to a larger space, including a larger laboratory, in the Health and Physics Building. The program's designation was changed to School of Nursing, within the College of Health and Public Affairs, in 1995. The same year, the Master of Science in Nursing (MSN) program began in the fall. In 1998, UCF created the state's fully online RN to BSN program. The year 2003 saw the launch of the nursing PhD program.

On July 1, 2007, the School of Nursing became the College of Nursing, UCF's twelfth college, to recognize its growth and stature. The following year, UCF Foundation established the Knightingale Society for alumni and friends of the college who provide annual contributions of $1,000 or more. In 2010, the College of Nursing moved to the University Tower building within Central Florida Research Park, adjacent to the main campus of UCF. Starting in 2014, the program was recognized by U.S. News & World Report as one of the nation's best online graduate programs, being ranked No. 24. In 2015, the College of Nursing launched the state's first online PhD program for nurse scientists.

Sharon Tucker, who previously served as department chair, was appointed Dean in 2025. In Fall 2025, the college moved to the Dr. Phillips Nursing Pavilion on the UCF Health Sciences Campus at Lake Nona enabling a closer partnership with the College of Medicine.

== Nursing program ==
About 3,000 students are enrolled in the UCF College of Nursing. The GPA of admitted students ranges from 3.42 to 4.0.

Undergraduate students seeking to become a nurse can earn a bachelor's in nursing degree (BSN) through the Traditional BSN program offered at three Central Florida campuses or in one of UCF's ASN to BSN concurrent programs through partnerships with UCF, Seminole State and Valencia.

UCF's nursing degree programs are accredited by the Commission on Collegiate Nursing Education.

Many students complete their nursing education through a partnership between UCF, Seminole State, and Valencia. Students earn an ASN degree from either Seminole or Valencia after 5 semesters, which also contributes five semesters' worth of coursework to a BSN through UCF. The NCLEX licensing exam is taken upon earning the ASN degree, in order to obtain an RN license. Students then transfer to UCF for two more semesters to complete the BSN degree.
