= Florida Solar Energy Center =

US research institute

Coordinates: 28.38640°N 80.75506°W

- Motto: "Creating Energy Independence"
- Type: Research Institute
- Established: 1975; 51 years ago
- Director: Dr. James M. Fenton
- Location: Cocoa, Florida, United States
- Website: Official Site

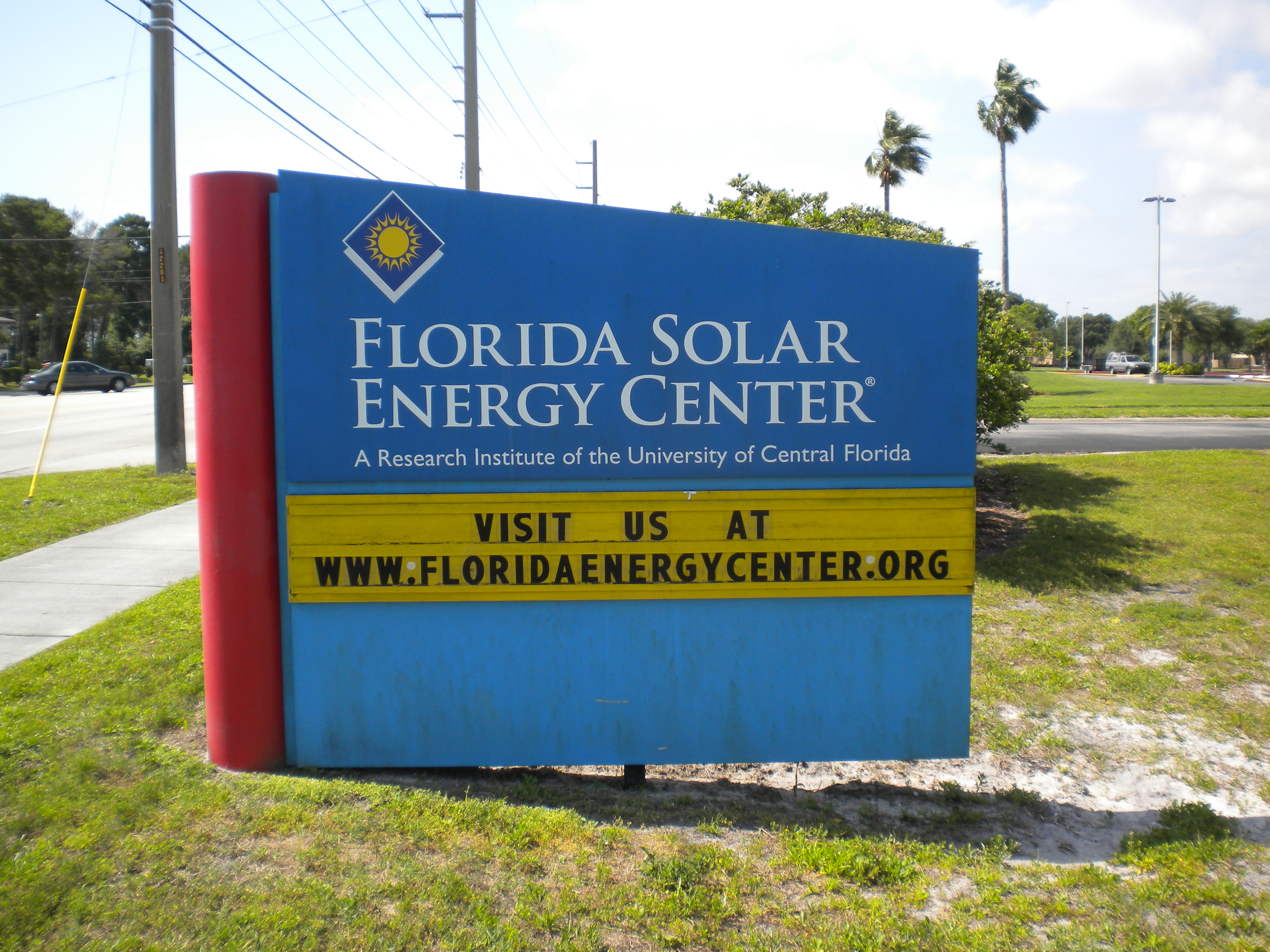
Florida Solar Energy Center

The Florida Solar Energy Center (FSEC) is a research institute of the University of Central Florida, located on a 20-acre (.08 km^{2}) research complex on Florida's Space Coast at UCF's Cocoa satellite campus. FSEC is the largest and most active state-supported renewable energy and energy efficiency research, training, testing and certification institute in the United States. The director of the institute is James M. Fenton, Ph.D.

== Operations ==
The Center's 150-member staff includes 95 professionals with expertise in engineering, energy research, building science, energy and policy analysis, and education and training. The remainder of the staff consists of technical and administrative support personnel and university student assistants. Research at FSEC is based on field monitoring, computer simulations and controlled experiments in highly instrumented laboratories. These research efforts are developed in partnership with industry, nonprofit organizations, private sponsors and national laboratories.

== Research and grants ==
In October 2009, the United States Department of Energy provided a $2.8 million grant to Solar Energy Center to help lead efforts to create and manage the newly created Solar Installer Instructor Training Network.

== See also ==
- Zero-energy building
- United States Department of Energy
- University of Central Florida research centers
