= University of Central Florida College of Education and Human Performance =

Academic college of the University of Central Florida

Coordinates: 28°36′01″N 81°12′14″W

College of Education and Human Performance
- Type: Public
- Established: 1968; 58 years ago
- Dean: Sandra L. Robinson, Ph.D.
- Undergraduates: 3,716
- Postgraduates: 1,934
- Location: Orlando, Florida, United States
- Website: Official Site

The University of Central Florida College of Education and Human Performance is an academic college of University of Central Florida located in Orlando, Florida, United States. The dean of the college is Sandra L. Robinson, Ph.D.

The College of Education and Human Performance provides over 100 degrees options to prepare students for a career in both primary and secondary education. The college is accredited by the National Council for Accreditation of Teacher Education (NCATE), and houses the UCF Academy for Teaching, Learning and Leadership.

== Academics ==
The college offers 14 undergraduate degree options, 63 graduate degree options, 11 minors, as well as two undergraduate certificates and 23 graduate certificates.

In fall 2013, the college was renamed the "College of Education and Human Performance" due to the diversified degree programs that it offered. The college had been known as the "College of Education" since it opened with the university in 1968.
