= University of Central Florida College of Medicine =

Public medical college in Orlando, Florida, US

Coordinates: 28°22′1.48″N 81°15′25.021″W

UCF College of Medicine
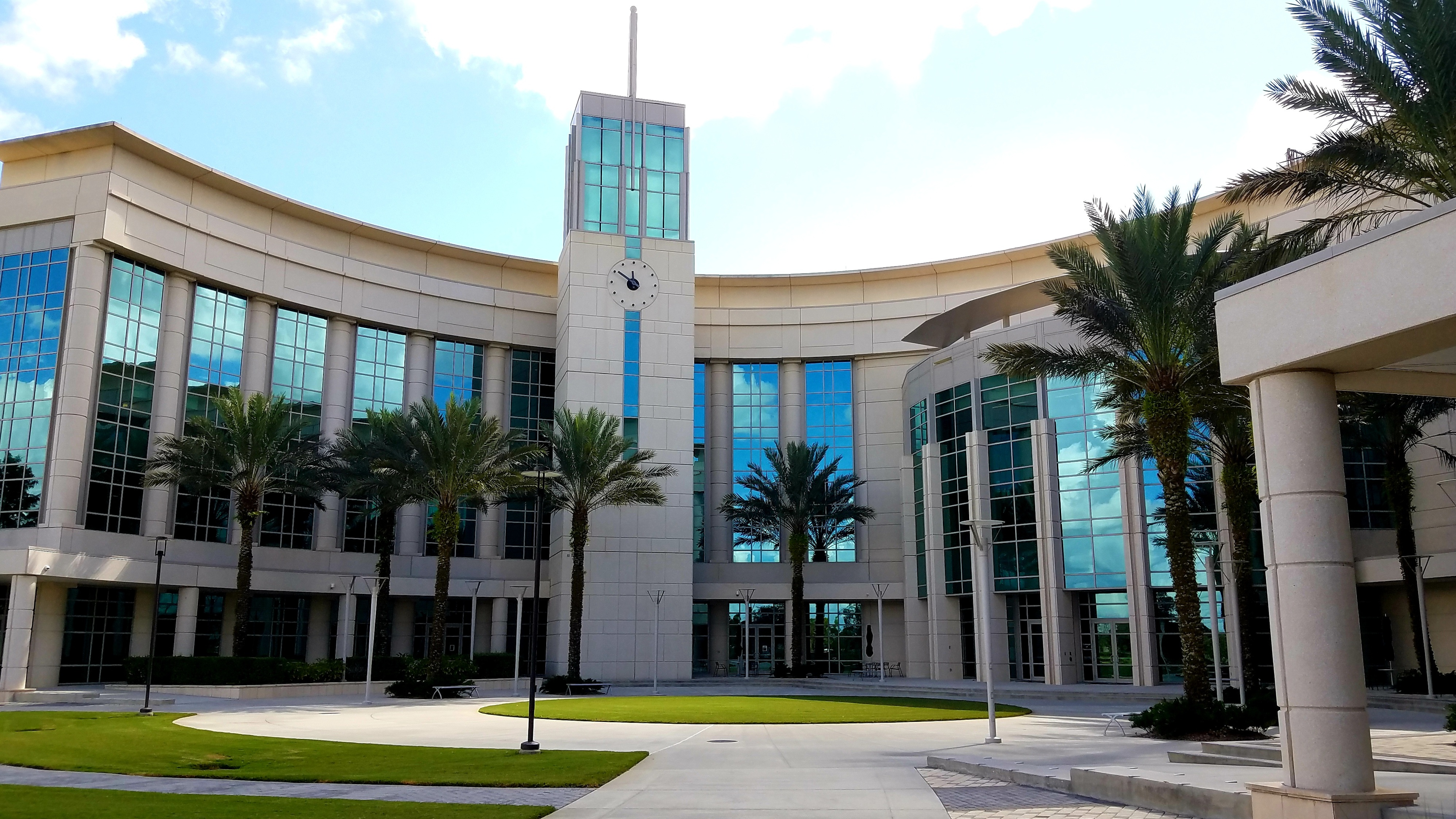
- Type: Public
- Established: 2006; 20 years ago
- Dean: Deborah German
- Academic staff: 1,100+
- Undergraduates: 2,627
- Postgraduates: 484 MD; 142 PhD
- Location: Orlando, Florida, United States
- Campus: Suburban 75 acres (0.30 km^{2})
- Website: med.ucf.edu

The University of Central Florida College of Medicine is the medical school of the University of Central Florida located in Orlando, Florida, United States. The Vice President of Health Affairs and dean of the college is Deborah German.

The college consists of a public medical school and the Burnett School of Biomedical Sciences located on the UCF Health Sciences campus in Lake Nona Medical City.

The UCF Lake Nona Medical Center opened in early 2021 as the medical school's main teaching hospital. In December 2018, UCF acquired the former Sanford Burnham Prebys Institute facility, which currently houses the UCF Lake Nona Cancer Center.

The UCF College of Medicine supports several residency and fellowship programs across the state of Florida, including programs in emergency medicine, general surgery, internal medicine, neurology, obstetrics and gynecology, and psychiatry.

== History ==
In October 2005, a local Orlando investment company, the Tavistock Group, donated $12.5 million and 50 acres (0.20 km^{2}) of land to UCF to help establish the UCF Medical School at Lake Nona, and issued a challenge to the Orlando community to help the university raise an additional $12.5 million to boost the total amount of raised funds to $25 million. This $25 million was eligible for a matching grant from the state; thus giving UCF the needed $50 million to create a new medical college. UCF received well over $100 million in donations, state-matching funds, and land value for the medical college's establishment.

On March 23, 2006, the Florida Board of Governors voted 15–1 in support of UCF's proposal to build a medical college. The College of Medicine would consist of a new UCF medical campus that was constructed at Lake Nona; located on the eastern edge of Orlando near the Orlando International Airport. Upon completion of the first phase, the base of the College of Medicine included a 113,000-square-foot (10,500 m^{2}) building for the Burnett School of Biomedical Sciences, and a 130,000-square-foot (12,000 m^{2}) College of Medicine instructional building and health sciences library.

The new College of Medicine offered an unprecedented full scholarship package to every member of its charter class; 41 students entering in fall 2009. The scholarship, financed by various donors, amounted to $40,000 per year, half going to tuition (out-of-state fees being waived) and the other half for living expenses. Dean German spearheaded the effort to secure these scholarships, having herself received a similar scholarship at Harvard Medical School. The new school received over 4,300 applications, including at least one with a perfect MCAT score, making it the most selective medical school in the United States at that time.

The UCF College of Medicine announced February 11, 2013, that it had received full accreditation from the LCME. On May 17, 2013, 36 students in the College of Medicine Charter Class graduated with their medical degrees.

== Campus and facilities ==
UCF's College of Medicine is located on the University's Health Sciences Campus in the Lake Nona neighborhood of Orlando. The 50 acre (0.2 km^{2}) campus is located on the eastern edge of Orlando, about 30 minutes from UCF's main campus. The Medical City also currently serves as a home to the UCF Lake Nona Medical Center, the UCF College of Nursing, UCF's Burnett Biomedical Sciences Building, Nemours Children’s Hospital, the University of Florida Academic and Research Center, and the Orlando Veterans Affairs Medical Center (VA).

== Academics ==
=== Medical school ===
==== Admissions ====
M.D. Academic profile (Class of 2025)
Avg MCAT	515
Avg GPA	3.84
Out-of-state	33%
Male/Female	58/62

Admission to the medical school is based mainly on GPA, Medical College Admission Test (MCAT) score, admissions essays, an interview, clinical work experience, and volunteering activities, along with research and leadership roles in the applicant's history. Background checks on applicants are required by the Association of Medical Colleges in order to prevent individuals with convictions for serious crimes from matriculating. The Class of 2025 had an average MCAT score of 515 and undergraduate GPA of 3.84.

==== Curriculum ====
The medical school began clinical education in fall 2009 with a charter class of 41. The college's enrollment has increased in subsequent years and will reach 480 at full enrollment. Full accreditation was obtained in 2013.

The medical school curriculum is four years long. The first two years are composed mainly of classroom basic sciences education, while the last two years primarily include rotations in clinical settings where students learn patient care firsthand. Clinical education is spread across all four years, with the final years being heavily weighted towards clinical rotations. The four-year medical program capitalizes on UCF's existing strengths in biomedical sciences, modeling and simulation.

=== Burnett School of Biomedical Sciences ===
The Burnett School of Biomedical Sciences houses the Department of Molecular Biology and Microbiology, the Biomolecular Science Center, the Medical Laboratory Sciences Program and the Pre-Health Professions Advisement Office. The school offers three undergraduate degrees: a Bachelor of Science in Molecular Biology and Microbiology, a Bachelor of Science in Biotechnology, and a Bachelor of Science in Medical Laboratory Science. Two graduate degrees are also offered: a Master of Science in Molecular Biology and Microbiology and a Ph.D. program in Interdisciplinary Biomedical Science.

The school was named after Al and Nancy Burnett after receiving a $10 million donation from them. In August 2007, the program was converted to a school under the newly formed UCF College of Medicine from being an independent college. The goal of the school is to build a nationally recognized biomedical research and education enterprise. The Burnett School of Biomedical Sciences is housed in a 198,000-square-foot (18,400 m^{2}) building on the health sciences campus which opened in 2009 and also on the main UCF campus.

=== Health Sciences Library ===
The Harriet F. Ginsburg Health Sciences Library was created during the 2009 founding of the College of Medicine through a gift from local philanthropist Alan Ginsburg. The library was named in honor of his late wife Harriet, who loved reading.

The library is located on the second floor of the College of Medicine Medical Education building at the Lake Nona UCF Health Sciences Campus. It has study areas, reading spaces, an information commons, and six public computer terminals. The library is 98% electronic with a goal of becoming 100% electronic in 5 years. In keeping with their goal of becoming 100% electronic, the Harriet F. Ginsburg Health Sciences Library has become the center of the College of Medicine’s iPad Initiative and deployment. The library has been honored by the Association of American Medical Colleges (AAMC) and by the Consortium of Southern Biomedical Libraries (CONBLS) as a leading medical electronic library for its innovative programs.

=== Degrees ===
The college currently offers baccalaureate, graduate, and professional degrees in five distinct programs.

- Biomedical Sciences
- Biomedical Neuroscience
- Biotechnology
- Medical Laboratory Sciences
- Medicine (M.D.)
- Molecular Biology and Microbiology

== Notable Faculty Members ==
- Deborah German, M.D.: Founding dean of the College of Medicine and Vice President for Health Affairs
- Sampath Parthasarathy, Ph.D.: lipid scientist and cardiovascular researcher
- Edward A. Ross, M.D.: Chair of the Department of Internal Medicine
- Nadine Dexter, Ed.D., MLS, D-AHIP: Founding Director of the UCF Health Sciences Library and leader in medical informatics
- Martin Klapheke, M.D.: former Director of the Karl Menninger School of Psychiatry and founder of the UCF psychiatry residency program

== See also ==
- List of medical schools in the United States
