= List of University of Central Florida faculty and administrators =

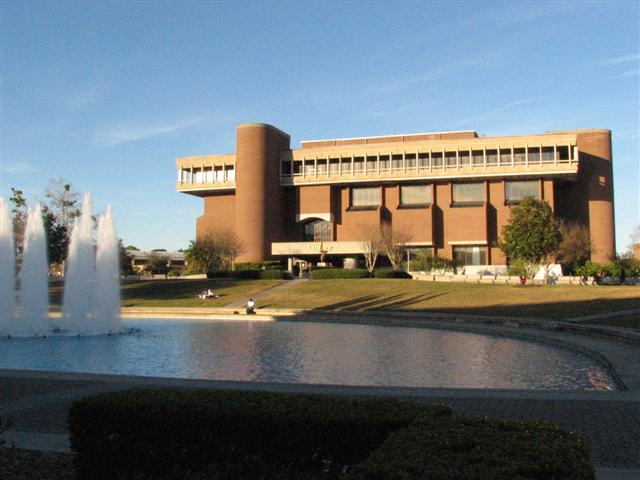
The John C. Hitt Library and Reflection Pond, located on UCF's main campus

The University of Central Florida is a space-grant metropolitan public research university located on a 1,415-acre (5.73 km^{2}) main campus in Orlando, Florida, United States. UCF is a member institution of the State University System of Florida and is the second-largest university in the United States.

UCF consists of a 59,770 member student body and employs more than 10,000 people, including over 1,900 teaching faculty and adjuncts. University of Central Florida faculty and administrators include those who are currently serving and have formerly served the university as professors, deans, administrative officials, or in other notable educational capacities.

== Administration ==
- Steven Altman, former president of the University of Central Florida (1989–1991), current president of NewSchool of Architecture and Design
- Robert A. Bryan, former interim president of the University of Central Florida (1991–1992)
- Alexander N. Cartwright, current president of the University of Central Florida (2020–present)
- Trevor Colbourn, former president of the University of Central Florida (1978–1989)
- John C. Hitt, former president of the University of Central Florida (1992–2018)
- Charles Millican, former president of the University of Central Florida (1965–1978)
- Todd Stansbury, current University of Central Florida vice president and director of athletics
- Tony Waldrop, former University of Central Florida provost and executive vice president
- Dale Whittaker, former president of the University of Central Florida (2018–2019)

== Trustees ==
- Jim Atchison, current charter member of the University of Central Florida Board of Trustees, current president and chief executive officer of SeaWorld Parks & Entertainment
- Olga Calvet, current vice chair of the University of Central Florida Board of Trustees
- Manoj Chopra, former member of the University of Central Florida board of trustees and chair of the UCF Faculty Senate, 2005–2009
- Ida Cook, current charter member of the University of Central Florida Board of Trustees
- Meg Crofton, current charter member of the University of Central Florida Board of Trustees, current president of Walt Disney World Resort
- Richard Crotty, current charter member of the University of Central Florida Board of Trustees, former mayor of Orange County, Florida
- Alan Florez, current charter member of the University of Central Florida Board of Trustees
- Robert Garvy, current charter member of the University of Central Florida Board of Trustees
- Ray Gilley, current charter member of the University of Central Florida Board of Trustees
- Michael Grindstaff, chairman of the University of Central Florida Board of Trustees and of the UCF Foundation, Inc.
- Marcos Marchena, current charter member of the University of Central Florida Board of Trustees, vice chair of the UCF Foundation, Inc.
- Harris Rosen, current charter member of the University of Central Florida Board of Trustees, current president and Chief Executive Officer of Rosen Hotels & Resorts
- John Sprouls, current charter member of the University of Central Florida Board of Trustees, current chief executive officer of Universal Orlando and executive vice president of Universal Parks & Resorts
- Daniel Webster, former charter member of the University of Central Florida Board of Trustees, current United States representative from Florida
- Al Weiss, former charter member of the University of Central Florida Board of Trustees, former president of Worldwide Operations for Walt Disney Parks and Resorts
- Melissa Westbrook, current charter member of the University of Central Florida Board of Trustees, current president of the UCF Student Government Association

== Deans ==
- José Fernández, former dean of the University of Central Florida College of Arts and Humanities
- Michael Frumkin, current dean of the University of Central Florida College of Health and Public Affairs
- Deborah C. German, current dean of the University of Central Florida College of Medicine
- Paul Jarley, current dean of the University of Central Florida College of Business Administration
- Michael Johnson, current dean of the University of Central Florida College of Sciences
- Jean D’Meza Leuner, current dean of the University of Central Florida College of Nursing
- Abraham Pizam, current dean of the Rosen College of Hospitality Management
- Sandra L. Robinson, current dean of the University of Central Florida College of Education and Human Performance
- Bahaa E. A. Saleh, current dean of the University of Central Florida College of Optics and Photonics
- Michael Georgiopoulos, current dean of the University of Central Florida College of Engineering and Computer Science
- Eric Van Stryland, former dean of the University of Central Florida College of Optics and Photonics, co-developer of the Z-scan technique, fellow of the Optical Society of America, SPIE and American Physical Society
- Alvin Y. Wang, former dean of The Burnett Honors College
- John F. Weishampel, current interim dean of the University of Central Florida College of Graduate Studies

== Professors and faculty ==
- Kareem Al Allaf (born 1998), American tennis player who has played for Syria and the US; UCF assistant tennis coach
- Muhammad bin Fahd Al Saud, namesake of Prince Mohammad Bin Fahd Program for Research and Strategic Studies at the university
- James H. Ammons, president of Florida A&M University
- Arlen F. Chase, archaeologist and chair of the Department of Archaeology at UCF
- Paul H. Cheney, academic
- Robert Denhardt, current regent professor at Arizona State University, Fulbright Scholar and former president of the American Society for Public Administration
- Narsingh Deo, former chair of the Department of Computer Science, director of the Center for Parallel Computation
- Harriet Elam-Thomas, former United States ambassador to Senegal
- Howard Eves, mathematician and author of Mathematical Circles series
- Yanga R. Fernández, astronomer and co-discoverer the Carme group
- Louis Frey, Jr., former United States Representative from Florida, founder of the Lou Frey Institute of Politics and Government
- Stuart Fullerton, entomologist, founder of the "Bug Closet" at the University of Central Florida
- Ken Hanson (born 1953), Judaic studies scholar, expert on the Dead Sea Scrolls and Kabbalah
- Ulric Haynes, former United States ambassador to Algeria
- Susan Hubbard, author, winner of the Janet Heidinger Kafka Prize
- Stephen Jepson, pottery expert and videographer, founder of the World Pottery Institute
- Dan Jones, English studies scholar, specialist in technical communication
- Anne B. Kerr, current president of Florida Southern College and former assistant dean at UCF
- J. Peter Kincaid, scientist who developed the Flesch–Kincaid readability test for the U.S. Navy; founding director of the Modeling and Simulation doctorate program at UCF
- Emilee Klein, former professional golfer and former head golf coach at UCF
- Richard Lapchick, current director of the DeVos Sport Business Management Program and the Institute for Diversity and Ethics in Sport; nationally known human rights activist and sports scholar
- Gary T. Leavens, scholar on behavioral interface specification languages (BISLs) and JML
- John A. List, current professor of economics at the University of Chicago
- Ron Logan, former executive vice president of Walt Disney Creative Entertainment
- Charles Negy, professor of psychology
- Peter Telep, author and screenwriter
- Ahmed I. Zayed, mathematician and current chair of the Department of Mathematical Sciences at DePaul University
- Boris Yakovlevich Zeldovich (1944–2018), Russian-American physicist

== See also ==
- University of Central Florida
- List of University of Central Florida alumni
