= University of Central Florida Student Government =

Student government of the University of Central Florida

- Abbreviation: UCF SG
- President: Shivani Vakharia
- Vice President: Dwayne Jones
- Speaker of the Senate: Owen Sherman
- Senate President Pro Tempore: Ryan Kaufman
- Chief Justice: Bella Pazera
- Supervisor of Elections: Andrew Collazo
- Founded: March 9, 1969; 57 years ago
- Preceded by: Florida Technological University Student Government (1969–1978)
- Headquarters: Orlando, Florida, United States
- Membership (Fall 2025): 70,658
- University: University of Central Florida
- Budget: US$20.3 million (FY 2026-2027)
- Executive cabinet seats: 15
- Senate seats: 70
- Judicial seats: 14

Website
- studentgovernment.ucf.edu

The University of Central Florida Student Government (UCF SG) is the student body government for the University of Central Florida, a metropolitan public research university located in Orlando, Florida, United States. It is the largest Student Government within the state of Florida and one of the largest in the United States. It also often places in the top ten Student Governments nationally for the services and outreach it provides for the students it serves. SG also serves as the liaison between the student body and University Administration. The Executive, Legislative and Judicial branches as well as the Election Commission are governed by the student-adopted Constitution.

Student Government creates, approves, and oversees an approximately $20 million budget generated by student fees and self-generated revenue – one of the largest student government budgets in the United States. With its budget, SG funds and operates two campus facilities, the Recreation and Wellness Center and the Student Union, while also providing nearly $1 million in funding to 600 registered student organizations.

== Constitution ==
The preamble of the Constitution of the Student Body of the University of Central Florida reads:

We, the students of the University of Central Florida, in order to maintain the benefits of constitutional liberty, to create a representative association through which the individual student can participate actively in this University, and to promote cooperation among the Student Body, Faculty, and Administration, do hereby ordain and establish this Constitution for the University of Central Florida Student Body.

The Constitution consists of six Articles. The first Article details the jurisdiction of the student government, franchise, and the requirements for referendums. The second, third, and fourth articles embody the doctrine of the separation of powers seen in the federal and state constitutions, whereby the government is divided into three branches: the legislature, the executive, and the judiciary, respectively. The fifth article discusses the Senior Student Affairs Officer, which is a staff member designated as the administrative head of the student government, and designated as such by the university president. The sixth article provides the procedure for amending and ratifying the Constitution.

The Constitution has been amended over forty times, the first being in April 1970. An amendment may be proposed by a two-thirds vote of the senate, or a petition with fifteen percent of the number of votes cast for president in the previous election. Amendments must be reviewed and approved by the university president.

== Legislature ==
Senate Apportionment
College/school	Seats
Arts and Humanities	4
Business Administration	9
Community Innovation and Education	6
Engineering and Computer Science	13
Graduate Studies	9
Health Professions and Sciences	5
Medicine	3
Nursing	2
Rosen College of Hospitality Management	2
Sciences	15
Optics and Photonics	1
Undeclared	1

Legislative authority is vested in a Student Senate. The Senate currently consists of seventy elected senators, one for each 1,000 students as required by statute. The Senate is led by the Senate President, who is elected at the beginning of each term. The Senate President Pro Tempore is also elected at the same time as the Senate President to help manage the legislative agenda. According to the Constitution and Statutes, elections for Senate are held each spring – usually in late March or early April. A plurality of the votes cast is required to win. The newly elected senators are inaugurated at the first meeting of the new Senate session. The Senate is bound by university policy, applicable state and federal statutes, and the state and federal constitutions. Newly elected senators take an oath to obey the student body, state, and federal constitutions.

Senate bills must be signed by both the Student Body President and the Senior Student Affairs Officer. Either officer may veto any Senate bill. The Senate may override the veto of the student body president by a two-thirds vote, at which the time the legislation is passed to the Senior Student Affairs Officer for approval or veto. If a bill is vetoed by the Senior Student Affairs Officer, the Senate may override the veto by a two-thirds vote, at which time the legislation goes to the president of the university for ultimate review. The decision of the university president is final and may not be overridden by the Senate. In 2010, a veto by the Senior Student Affairs Officer was successfully overridden by the Senate and sent to the university president. Resolutions require only the signatures of the Senate President and President Pro Tempore. Proclamations require the signatures of both the Senate President and the Student Body President.

=== Budget and fiscal policy ===
The Senate is the body required by statutes to pass appropriations and to submit funding bills passed to the student body president for signature. Fiscal decisions are governed by rules and statutes regarding the budget process. Under state law (§ 240.235), the Senate has sole jurisdiction – except for the approval by the Senior Student Affairs Officer or their designee – over the allocation of the university's Activity and Service Fee budget. Each fall, a budget committee is created and is responsible for the creation for the next fiscal years budget, including the allocation of funding to the various SG branches, departments, agencies, services, and buildings. The annual budget is completed in early spring and presented to the Senate for consideration before the end of the spring semester. The proposed budget must be approved by the Senate, Student Body President, Senior Student Affairs Officer, and the university president.

The Senate is also responsible for the creation of rules governing the use of appropriated funds, including the setting of funding levels for bills and allocations, and the prohibition of use of funds for certain items and activities.

How the SG budget is spent is a matter of public record, and UCF's attempts to invoke a federal privacy law called FERPA to conceal portions of SG spending were deemed illegal by one of the highest courts in Florida.

=== Committees ===
Within the Senate are seven committees with unique and sole jurisdiction over their respective matters. Each committee is composed of a maximum of 20% of the total number of senators, including a chair and vice-chair. Senators are appointed to committees by the Senate President and statutes require that senators serve on a minimum of one committee. Senators are also required to hold a meeting each semester with their constituents and deans, as well as represent about 10 of the over 600 registered student organizations.

Fiscal committees

- Financial Allocations for Organizations: Approved allocations and bills to host events, create projects, and get promotional items for registered student organizations.
- Conference Registration and Travel: Approved allocations and bills for travel, registration, and conference expenses for individual students and registered student organizations.
- Operations Review and Sanctions Committee: Reviews and investigates the use of all funds allocated through the activity and service fee.

Internal committees

- Legislative, Judicial, and Rules: Reviews legislation and recommends changes concerning the Student Government Constitution, Student Body Statutes, and Senate Rules.
- Elections and Appointments: Interviews and reviews appointments made by the student body president.
- Student Body Advocacy: Advocates on issues that affect the student body, specifically university issues.
- Governmental Affairs and Policy: Reviews local, state, and federal laws and legislation that affect the student body.

== Executive ==
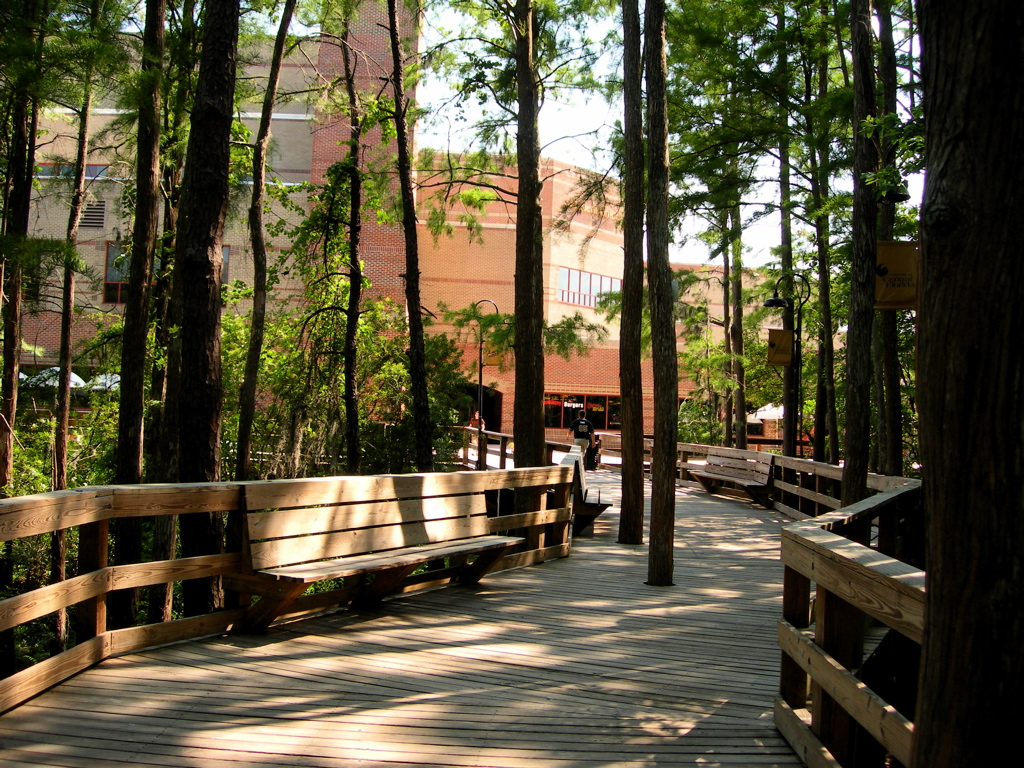
The boardwalk behind the UCF Student Union, an SG funded and operated facility

Article IV vests the executive power in a Student Body President. The Student Body President and Vice President serve an identical one-year term, elected each spring by a majority vote of the student body. The president may serve for a maximum of two consecutive terms and may not seek further elected office after their term(s) has/have ended. The vice president may serve in that capacity for a maximum of two terms. Candidates must be UCF students, and in good academic and financial standing with the university. Candidates usually have prior experience in SG, either as a member of the Senate or the Executive Cabinet.

The president is vested with the authority to appoint officers to vacancies within SG, including open senate seats, and to the Executive Cabinet – which consists of an Attorney General, Judicial Advisor, Comptroller, Chief of Staff, Deputy Chief of Staff, Director of Communications, Director of Student Affairs, Academic Affairs Coordinator, Sustainability and Innovation Coordinator, Safety and Transportation Coordinator, Athletics Coordinator, and various other positions as determined by the Student Body President. In total, within the executive branch are between 10 and 20 appointed and paid cabinet members that oversee everything from university policies to tracking the state's legislature. These positions are subject to confirmation by a two-thirds vote of the Senate. The president also has the authority to call and preside over meetings of the Student Body when appropriate, to call for a referendum of the student body (with two-thirds concurrence vote of the Senate), and to veto legislation passed by the Senate. The Senate may override a presidential veto with a two-thirds vote. The president may remove appointees to Executive offices at will, unless otherwise specified in the Constitution. The president is also vested with the power to provide for the effective expenditure of student funds as allocated by the Senate. With this power, the president has the authority to suspend SG agencies for malfeasance or violation of statutes.

The president serves as a member of the university's Board of Trustees and the Florida Student Association (FSA), which is an association composed of all student body presidents and their respective staffs from Florida's state universities. The chair of the FSA serves on the Florida Board of Governors, the governing board of the state university system. UCF student body president Cortez Whatley served as FSA chair from 2012 to 2013.

== Judiciary ==
The Judicial Branch performs the judiciary function for SG. The Judicial Council consists of fourteen Associate Justices, led by a Chief Justice. Justices are appointed by the president and subject to confirmation by a two-thirds vote of the Senate. The council has jurisdiction over questions of the Student Body Constitution, student rights, disputes and regulations of university policy, and parking and grade appeals. The council has the final authority on questions of constitutional interpretation for SG when such questions are submitted by any student. The council also has the power of judicial review, the power to examine legislative and executive acts. Such acts brought to the attention of the Council may be declared unconstitutional. All decisions by the council are binding and valid on all affected parties.

== See also ==
- Education in Florida
- Florida Board of Governors
- Florida Student Association
- State University System of Florida
- United States Student Association
- University of Colorado Student Government
- University of Central Florida Board of Trustees
