= CUSG =

CUSG may refer to:

- Canadian University Science Games
- Confederación de Unidad Sindical de Guatemala
- University of Colorado Student Government
