= Camping World Stadium =

Stadium in Orlando, Florida

- "Orlando Citrus Bowl"

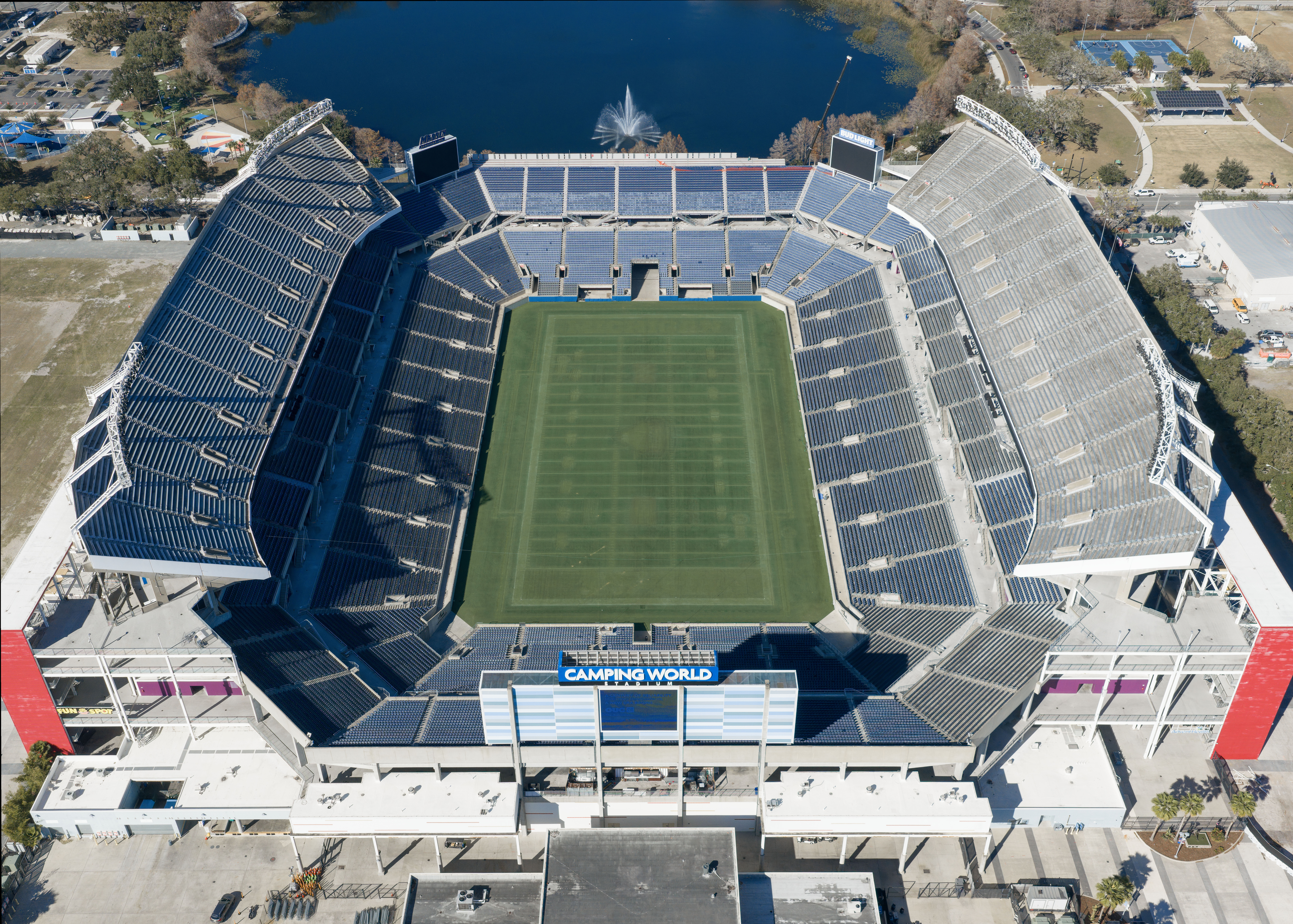
- Aerial view from south in February 2026

- Location in the United States Location in Florida
- Former names: Orlando Stadium (1936–1946, 1977–1982); Tangerine Bowl (1947–1975); Citrus Bowl (1976); Florida Citrus Bowl (1983–2013); Orlando Citrus Bowl (2014–2016)
- Address: 1 Citrus Bowl Place
- Location: Orlando, Florida, U.S.
- Coordinates: 28°32′20″N 81°24′10″W
- Elevation: 100 feet (30 m) AMSL
- Owner: City of Orlando
- Operator: Orlando Venues
- Capacity: Football: 60,219 (2014–present) (expandable to 65,194); Soccer: 19,500 (expandable to 60,219)
- Surface: AstroTurf RootZone 3D3 (2016–present)
- Record attendance: WrestleMania 33: 64,900 (April 2, 2017)
- Field size: Football: 120 yd × 53.3 yd (109.7 m × 48.7 m); Soccer: 114 yd × 74 yd (104 m × 68 m)
- Public transit: 20, 21, 36

Construction
- Groundbreaking: Early 1936
- Opened: Late 1936; 90 years ago
- Renovated: 1999–2002, 2014, 2021, 2025-2026
- Expanded: 1952, 1968, 1974–1976, 1989, 1999–2002
- Cost: 1936: US$115,000 ($2.67 million in 2025 dollars); 1989 renovation: US$38 million ($98.7 million in 2025 dollars); 2014 renovation: US$207 million ($282 million in 2025 dollars)

Tenants
- Citrus Bowl (NCAA) 1947–present Cure Bowl (NCAA) 2015–2018; 2020; 2024–present Pop-Tarts Bowl (NCAA) 2001–present Florida Classic (NCAA) 1997–present Past: Orlando Broncos (SFL) 1962–1963; Orlando Panthers (COFL) 1966–1970; Florida Blazers (WFL) 1974; UCF Knights (NCAA) 1979–2006; Orlando Americans (AFA) 1981; Orlando Renegades (USFL) 1985; Orlando Thunder (WLAF) 1991–1992; Orlando Sundogs (USL 1) 1997; Orlando Rage (XFL) 2001; Florida Tuskers (UFL) 2009–2010; Orlando Fantasy (LFL) 2011–2012; Orlando City SC (USL Pro/MLS) 2011–2013; 2015–2016; Orlando Pride (NWSL) 2016; Orlando Guardians (XFL) 2023; Jones High School until 2011

Website
- campingworldstadium.com

Camping World Stadium is a multi-purpose stadium in Orlando, Florida, United States, located in the West Lakes neighborhood of Downtown Orlando. It opened in 1936 as Orlando Stadium and has also been known as the Tangerine Bowl and Florida Citrus Bowl. The City of Orlando owns and operates the stadium.

Camping World Stadium is best known as the current home venue of the Citrus Bowl, the Cure Bowl, and the Pop-Tarts Bowl. It is also the regular host of a regular season college football game called the Florida Classic between Florida A&M and Bethune-Cookman. The stadium was built for football and in the past, it has served as the home of numerous minor/alternate-league football clubs, including teams from the WFL, USFL, WLAF, XFL, UFL, and most recently the Orlando Guardians of the 2020 XFL. From 2011 to 2013, it was the home of the Orlando City SC, a soccer team in USL Pro, then it was a temporary home for Orlando City of MLS while Inter.co Stadium was under construction.

From 1979 to 2006, the stadium served as the home of the UCF Knights football team. It was one of the nine venues used for the 1994 FIFA World Cup, and also hosted 1996 Olympic soccer matches. The stadium has hosted the NFL's Pro Bowl five times.

== Stadium history ==
Construction on the stadium began in 1936 as a project of the Works Progress Administration under President Franklin D. Roosevelt during the Great Depression. The stadium was built to the immediate east of the baseball park Tinker Field, which opened in 1914. The stadium opened later in 1936 with a capacity of 8,900 as Orlando Stadium. The first college football bowl game was played on January 1, 1947. Catawba defeated Maryville 31–6 in the inaugural Tangerine Bowl. 2,000 seats were added in 1952. During this period, the stadium was known as the Tangerine Bowl. 5,000 more seats were added in 1968, along with the first press box.

From 1974 to 1976 an expansion project raised the capacity to 50,612, including a 3,600-seat upper deck on the east sidelines. However, shortly after completion the project proved to be a public fiasco and potentially an architectural and engineering failure. On November 27, 1976, the first major game was held at the expanded stadium, a regular season matchup between Florida and Miami. During the game, the newly constructed upper deck noticeably swayed whenever fans stood up and cheered. The deck vibrated, fences and railings shook and creaked, causing an unnerving sensation for the patrons sitting in those sections. The swaying and shaking was noticeable again about a month later during the 1976 Tangerine Bowl game. The swaying was so pronounced that some fans vowed never to sit in those seats again, while some refused to return to the stadium at all. Before long, engineering evaluations, as well as legal investigations, uncovered numerous missteps, rushing, and cut corners in the stadium's design. While it was believed that the upper deck was structurally sound and met building codes, it nevertheless was deemed a failure. Additional problems included inadequate access to restrooms in the upper deck, gaps between the sections which required obstructive fences, and the fact that the upper deck was built at such an angle that it had poor sight lines. Meanwhile, unsightly I-beams installed to hold up the upper deck now blocked seats in the lower deck that were previously unobstructed.

The maligned stadium's reputation was heavily tarnished after the upper deck scandal, criticized by public officials, media, and fans. Further complicating the situation was UCF's pending move to the stadium for 1979. The city finally received a settlement of $900,500 from the stadium's engineers, architects, and designers, money that was soon appropriated for new improvements. The infamous steel east upper deck was dismantled in May 1980.

After various new improvements, and a $30 million renovation that added new concrete upper decks to both sides, a capacity of 65,438 was established in 1989. In 1983, the Florida Department of Citrus was added as a title sponsor for the facility, at a price of $250,000. From 1999 to 2002, key stadium improvements included the addition of contour seating, two escalators, and a new 107-foot (33 m) wide scoreboard/video screen. A new sound system, along with two full-color ribbon displays along the upper decks, were also added. The expansion resulted in the upper deck overhanging Tinker Field's right field area, albeit at a significant height.

== Events hosted ==
=== Football ===
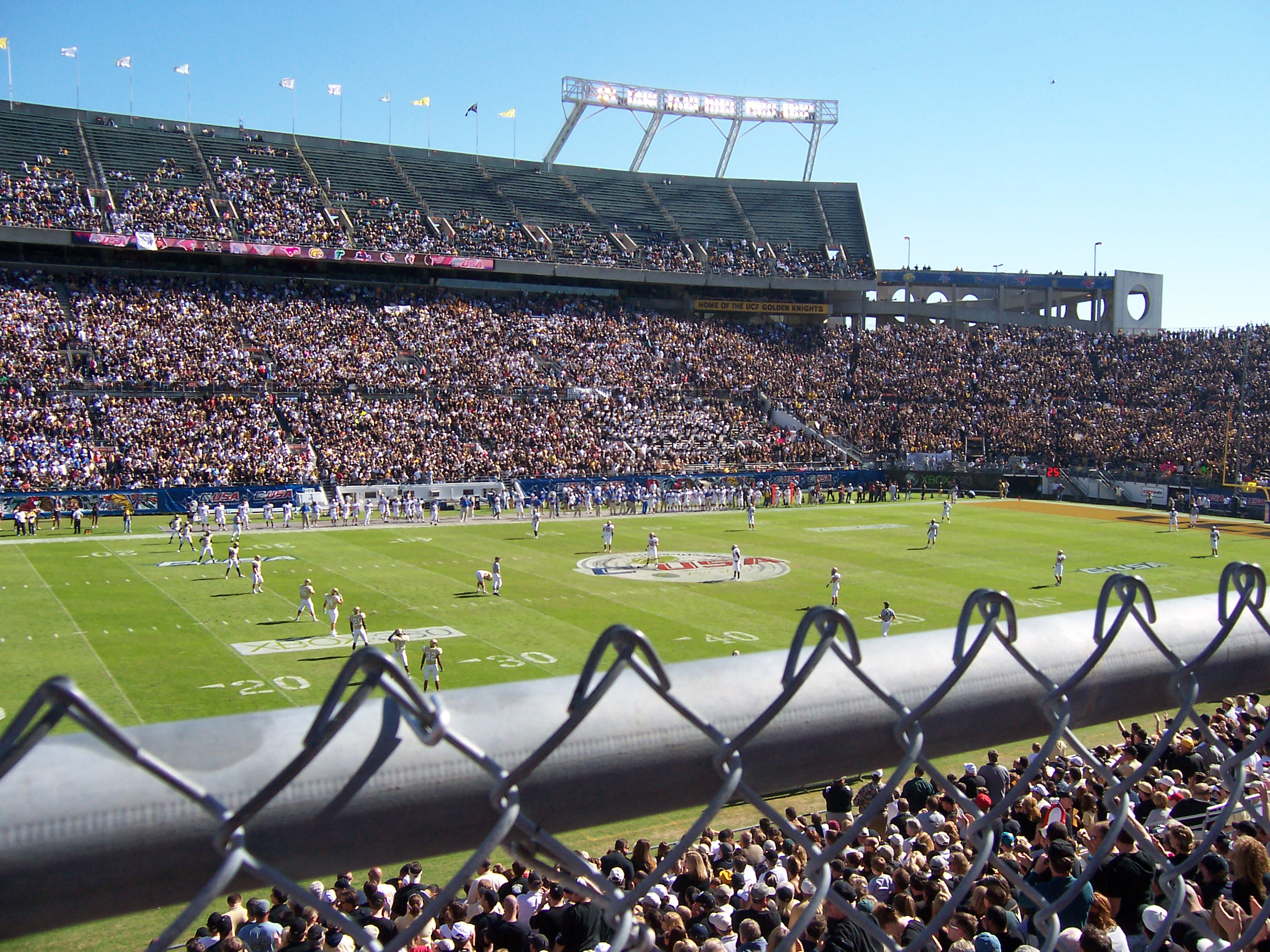
A view of the field during the inaugural C-USA Championship Game in 2005

==== Professional football ====
Camping World Stadium has been home field to several short-lived professional football teams. From 1966 to 1970, the stadium was home to the Orlando Panthers of the Continental Football League. In 1974, the Florida Blazers of the World Football League played their only season in existence at the Tangerine Bowl. The USFL's Orlando Renegades played one season in 1985. The Orlando Thunder of the WLAF called the Citrus Bowl home in their two-season existence during the early 1990s, while the XFL's Orlando Rage played there in 2001 as well as the UFL's Florida Tuskers, occupying the stadium for 2 seasons from 2009, before moving to Virginia Beach as the Virginia Destroyers in 2011. The Orlando Fantasy of the Lingerie Football League moved to the stadium shortly after, having previously used the UCF Arena.

In 2022, it was announced that Orlando had been chosen to be the home of one of the third incarnation of the XFL’s eight teams and that the team would play its home games at Camping World Stadium. The Orlando Guardians played in the 2023 XFL season before folding after the XFL's merger with the USFL.

The stadium hosted the NFL's all-star game, the Pro Bowl, from 2017 through 2020. In 2024, the event returned for a fifth time under the new title Pro Bowl Games. It was the first time since the NFL transitioned the event to a new format of skills competitions and non-contact flag football. Seven NFL preseason games have been held at the stadium. The stadium will host the Jacksonville Jaguars during the 2027 NFL season due to renovations at EverBank Stadium. The hosting plan was approved unanimously by the NFL owners on March 31, 2026.

==== College football ====
The stadium has hosted various college football games, including many bowl games:

- Since 1947 (except for 1973), the stadium has hosted a bowl game, currently known as the Citrus Bowl, typically played on January 1 or January 2. The bowl has also been known by different names, and has also been held during December, at various times during its history.
  - The December 1958 edition of the game, then known as the Tangerine Bowl, was notable for the segregation policy of the stadium operators, the Orlando High School Athletic Association (OHSAA), leading to the University at Buffalo declining their bowl bid, as their two black players would not have been allowed to play.
- Since 1997, the stadium has been home to the Florida Classic, an annual game between Bethune–Cookman University and Florida A&M University.
- Since 2001, the stadium has hosted a December bowl game, which has undergone several name changes due to sponsorship changes—since May 2023, it is known as the Pop-Tarts Bowl.
- In 2010 and 2011, the stadium hosted the East–West Shrine Game, which then moved to Tropicana Field in St. Petersburg, Florida.
- The stadium has hosted the Cure Bowl, a December bowl game, during 2015–2018 and in 2020. The bowl was announced to return in 2024.
- The stadium hosted the 1979 NCAA Division I-AA Football Championship Game, 2005 C-USA Championship Game, and 2016 ACC Championship Game.
- Rollins College of Winter Park, Florida, was the first college to use the then-named Orlando Stadium as its home field. It played there prior to and after World War II.
- From 2008-2013 and in 2015, the stadium hosted the MEAC/SWAC Challenge, which then moved to Legion Field in Birmingham, Alabama.
- From 2013-2023, the stadium hosted the Camping World Kickoff, which hasn't been played since 2023.

==== High school football ====
The Florida High School Athletic Association state football championships are held at Camping World Stadium. The varsity football team from nearby Jones High School used Camping World Stadium as a regular season home field for decades through the end of their 2011 season. The school started playing home football games on their own field beginning on August 31, 2012.

==== Armed forces football ====
From 1960 to 1964, the stadium hosted the Missile Bowl, a game that matched two of the country's top military service football teams. The Vietnam War resulted in a lack of service teams and the canceled in 1965.

=== Soccer ===
The playing surface is large enough for use in international soccer matches, and it was a venue for the 1994 FIFA World Cup. In five matches, attendance averaged over 60,000 per match. In 1996, Olympic soccer matches in both the men's and women's competitions were held at the stadium.

It hosted the USISL A-League Orlando Sundogs in 1997. It also hosted the Major League Soccer All-Star Game in 1998. The stadium was the home of Orlando City SC, a soccer team in the USL Pro League. In 2013, the investment group that owned that club was awarded an expansion team in Major League Soccer. They spent their 2014 season in USL Pro at ESPN Wide World of Sports Complex in Lake Buena Vista while Camping World Stadium was being renovated.

During the 2013 season, Fifth Third Bank owned naming rights to the field for Orlando City matches. Its name during those matches was Fifth Third Bank Field at the Citrus Bowl.

Orlando City played their final USL Pro match at Camping World Stadium on September 6, 2013. They won the USL Pro Championship over Charlotte Eagles, 7–4, before a crowd of 20,886. The last soccer event held at Camping World Stadium before its renovation was an international friendly between the women's teams of the United States and Brazil. The U.S. won the match, 4–1, before a crowd of 20,274.

Orlando City, now playing in Major League Soccer, returned to Camping World Stadium for the 2015 and 2016 seasons.

The Orlando Pride, the National Women's Soccer League 2016 expansion team owned by Orlando City SC, played in Camping World Stadium while the Orlando City (now Exploria) Stadium was completed.

Camping World Stadium was one of the venues for Copa América Centenario in June 2016. Three group stage matches were held there, Paraguay vs Costa Rica on June 4, Bolivia vs Panama on June 6 and Brazil vs Haiti on June 8.

The stadium hosted the Mexico national football team vs. Guatemala "MexTour" on April 27, 2022.

The 2022 Florida Cup exhibition soccer match between Arsenal and Chelsea, 4–0, had an attendance of 63,811, a record crowd for a soccer match at the stadium.

The stadium was also one of twelve venues to host the 2025 FIFA Club World Cup.

==== 1994 FIFA World Cup matches ====
Date	Time (UTC−5)	Team #1	Res.	Team #2	Round	Attendance
June 19, 1994	12:30	Belgium	1–0	Morocco	Group F	61,219
June 24, 1994	12:30	Mexico	2–1	Republic of Ireland	Group E	60,790
June 25, 1994	12:30	Belgium	1–0	Netherlands	Group F	62,387
June 29, 1994	12:30	Morocco	1–2	Netherlands	Group F	60,578
July 4, 1994	12:00	Netherlands	2–0	Republic of Ireland	Round of 16	61,355

==== Club friendlies ====
Date	Team #1	Result	Team #2	Competition	Attendance
July 23, 2022	(England) Arsenal	4–0	(England) Chelsea	2022 Florida Cup	63,811
August 2, 2023	(Spain) Real Madrid	1–3	(Italy) Juventus	Club Friendly	63,503
July 30, 2024	(Spain) Barcelona	2–2	(England) Manchester City	Club Friendly	63,237

==== 2025 FIFA Club World Cup ====
Date	Time (UTC−4)	Team #1	Res.	Team #2	Round	Attendance
June 24, 2025	21:00	Los Angeles FC (United States)	1–1	(Brazil) Flamengo	Group D	32,933
June 26, 2025	15:00	Juventus (Italy)	2–5	(England) Manchester City	Group G	54,320
June 30, 2025	21:00	Manchester City (England)	3–4 (a.e.t.)	(Saudi Arabia) Al-Hilal	Round of 16	42,311
July 4, 2025	15:00	Fluminense (Brazil)	2–1	(Saudi Arabia) Al-Hilal	Quarter-finals	43,091

=== WrestleMania ===
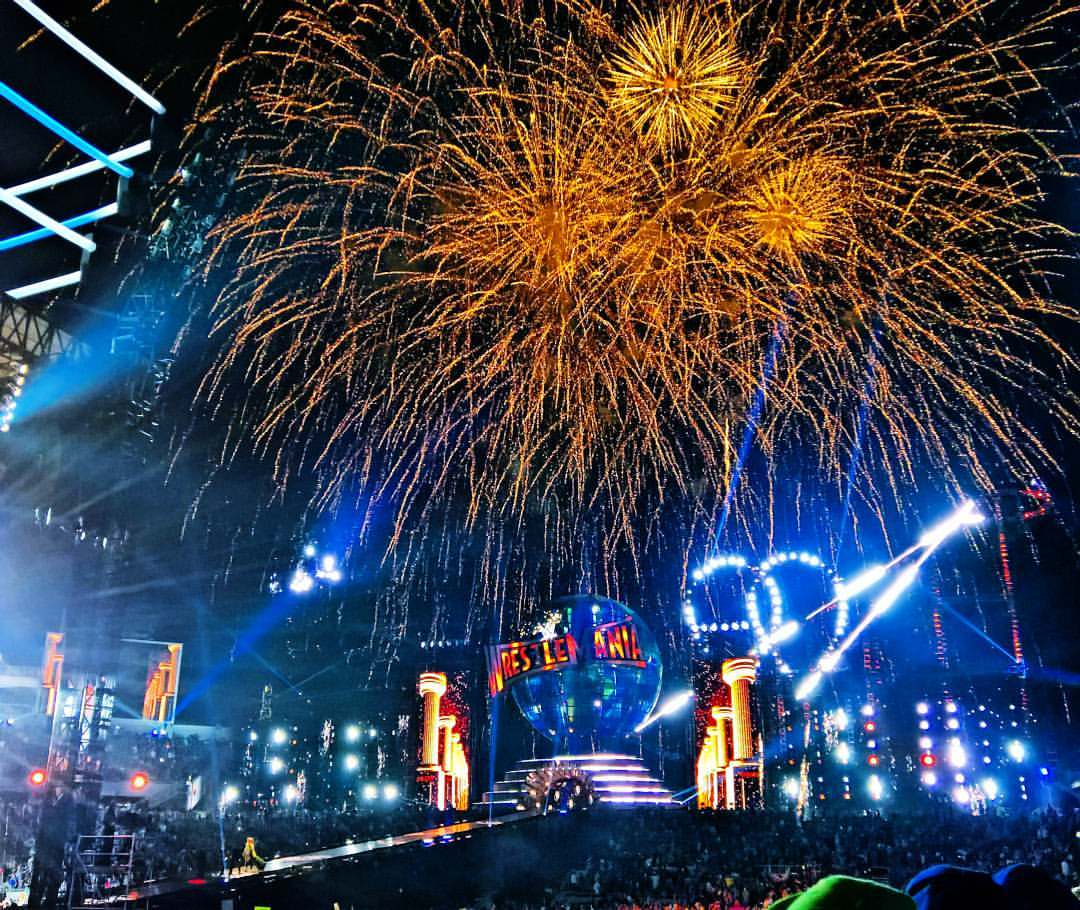
Camping World Stadium during WrestleMania 33.

On March 30, 2008, the stadium hosted WrestleMania XXIV, the 2008 edition of WWE's flagship professional wrestling pay-per-view, with the main event being The Undertaker defeating Edge. The first WrestleMania held in Florida, and the second to be held entirely outdoors since WrestleMania IX at Caesars Palace, it had a reported attendance of 74,635—the largest crowd in stadium history. It was estimated to have brought in $51.5 million in revenue to the local economy.

WWE returned to Camping World Stadium to host WrestleMania 33, which took place on April 2, 2017. The main event of the show was Roman Reigns defeating The Undertaker in what would be Undertaker's second ever defeat at the show. WWE claimed an attendance record of 75,245, exceeding the total of WrestleMania XXIV.

=== Other events ===
- The Citrus Bowl was the site of two Billy Graham Crusades, the most recent of which took place in 1983.
- During the 1996 Summer Olympics, it hosted some of the football preliminaries.
- Drum Corps International has held its annual World Championships at the stadium four times in 1996, 1997, 1998, and 2003
- The Feld Entertainment-promoted Monster Jam shows held there every year featured a track similar to the one at Sam Boyd Stadium in 2008 and 2009. The 2014 Monster Jam event on January 25 was the last event held at Camping World Stadium before its reconstruction began.
- The Corporate 5K Orlando road race has been based at the stadium for several years.
- The AMA Supercross Series holds an annual spring event. Supercross later returned in 2021.
- British rock band Pink Floyd performed their only concert in Orlando at the stadium on April 30, 1988, as part of their A Momentary Lapse of Reason tour.
- The stadium hosted the Rock Super Bowl festivals during the late 1970s and early 1980s
- Guns N' Roses continued their Not in This Lifetime... Tour, playing at the stadium on 29 July 2016 to a sold-out crowd.
- The stadium hosted Beyoncé and Jay-Z's On the Run II Tour on August 29, 2018, to a sold-out crowd.
- The stadium hosted the Monster Jam World Finals XX on May 10–11, 2019 and World Finals XXI on May 21–22, 2022.
- The stadium has hosted The Bands of America Orlando Regional Championship every fall since 2018 excluding 2020, when it was cancelled due to the COVID-19 pandemic.
- The stadium hosted Billy Joel on his only show stop in Florida on his stadium series of the Billy Joel in Concert Tour on March 12, 2022.
- The stadium hosted the Garth Brooks Triple Live Stadium Tour on March 26, 2022. The attendance was 70,000, which set a new concert attendance record at the stadium.
- The stadium hosted Paul McCartney's second and final Florida show on his Got Back Tour on May 28, 2022.
- Def Leppard and Mötley Crüe performed at the stadium on June 19, 2022, during their The Stadium Tour.
- Shakira performed at the stadium on June 4, 2025, as part of her Las Mujeres Ya No Lloran World Tour.
- Post Malone and Jelly Roll performed at the stadium on June 10, 2025, the former act's Big Ass Stadium Tour.
- Stray Kids performed at the stadium on June 14, 2025, for their Dominate World Tour.
- The Weeknd and Playboi Carti performed at the stadium on August 24, 2025, for the former act's After Hours til Dawn Tour.
- Chris Brown performed at the stadium on September 30, 2025, for his Breezy Bowl Tour.

== Renovations ==
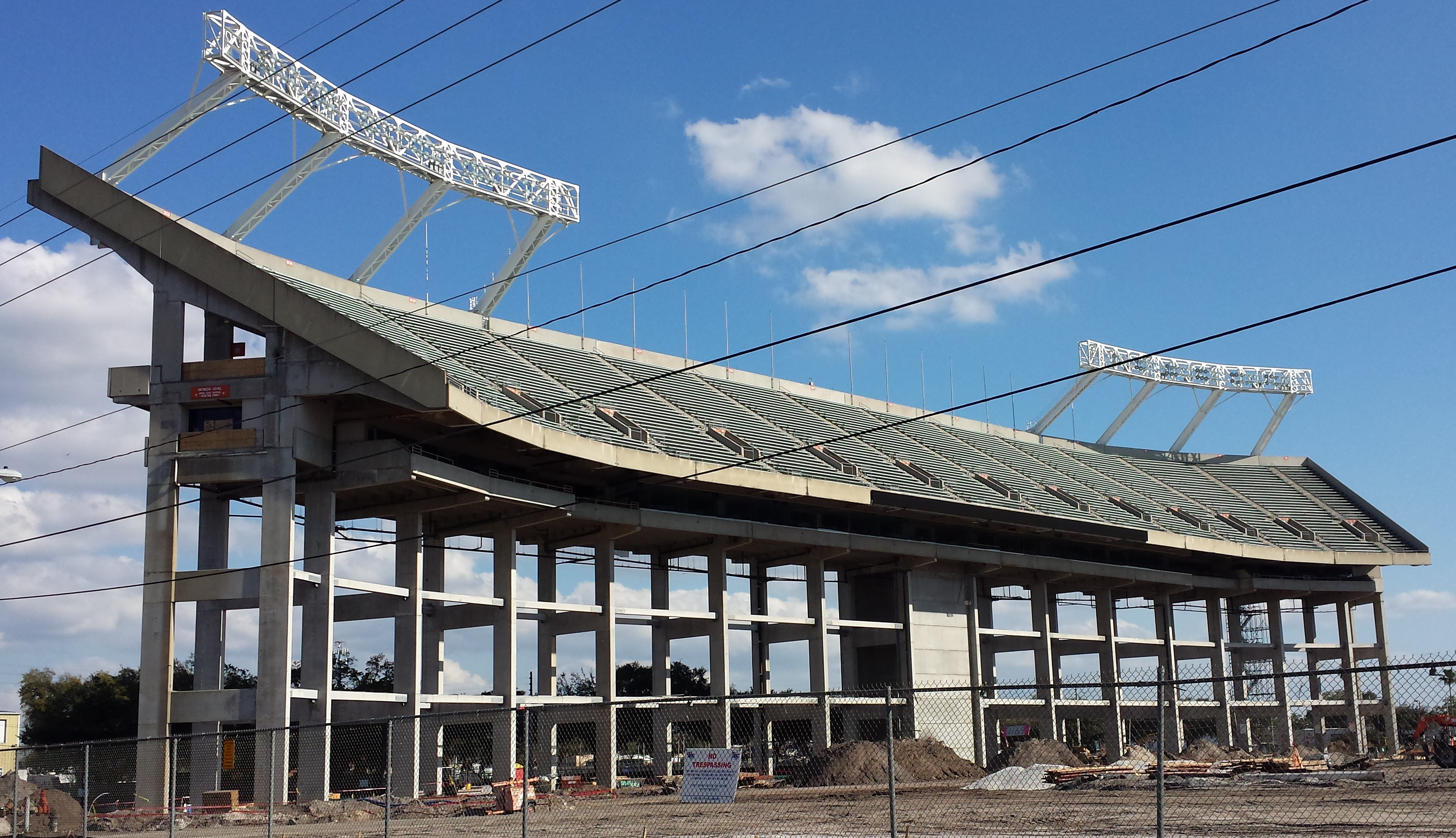
Upper deck during renovations in 2014

By 2005, Orlando-area government officials and officials from the University of Central Florida (UCF) expressed dissatisfaction with the state of the facility and lack of revenue, as while UCF was the primary leasing tenant for the facility, it received minimal revenue from football games. Lack of an agreement to rectify these issues led UCF to consider relocating, or spend considerable expense to upgrade the facility at its own cost. In addition, the stadium's capacity was seen as too large for UCF, leaving the stadium an appearance of being empty even with attendance of as much as 30,000–40,000 people per game. UCF's all-time attendance record was 51,978 for the 2005 C-USA Championship Game versus Tulsa. Furthermore, the stadium was located over 10 miles (16 km) from the university's main campus in East Orlando, with travel times of up to a half-hour due to traffic. In 2005, UCF officials led by university president John Hitt made the decision to construct a new on-campus stadium, which opened for the 2007 season.

Orlando officials began exploring stadium refurbishment project in 2004, when the Capital One Bowl bid to become a Bowl Championship Series (BCS) game, but was not chosen due to the stadium's aging condition. Camping World Stadium also submitted a bid for the ACC Championship Game, but lost to Jacksonville Municipal Stadium. The key reasons for losing the bids were the lack of modern luxury boxes, bench seating, and capacity. The hopes for Camping World Stadium became reality when, on September 29, 2006, Orlando Mayor Buddy Dyer announced an agreement on a $175-million renovation of Camping World Stadium. It is part of the "Triple Crown for Downtown", a $1.1-billion plan to redo the Orlando Centroplex with a new $480-million arena for the Orlando Magic, a new $375-million performing arts center, and the Camping World Stadium improvements. Conceptual drawings for the possible improvements include enclosed concourses on the east and west sides of the stadium and additions to the north side that will finally complete the lower bowl. The Orlando/Orange County Interlocal Agreement was approved by the Orlando City Council on August 6, 2007. However, the plans were heavily affected by the Great Recession of 2007–08.

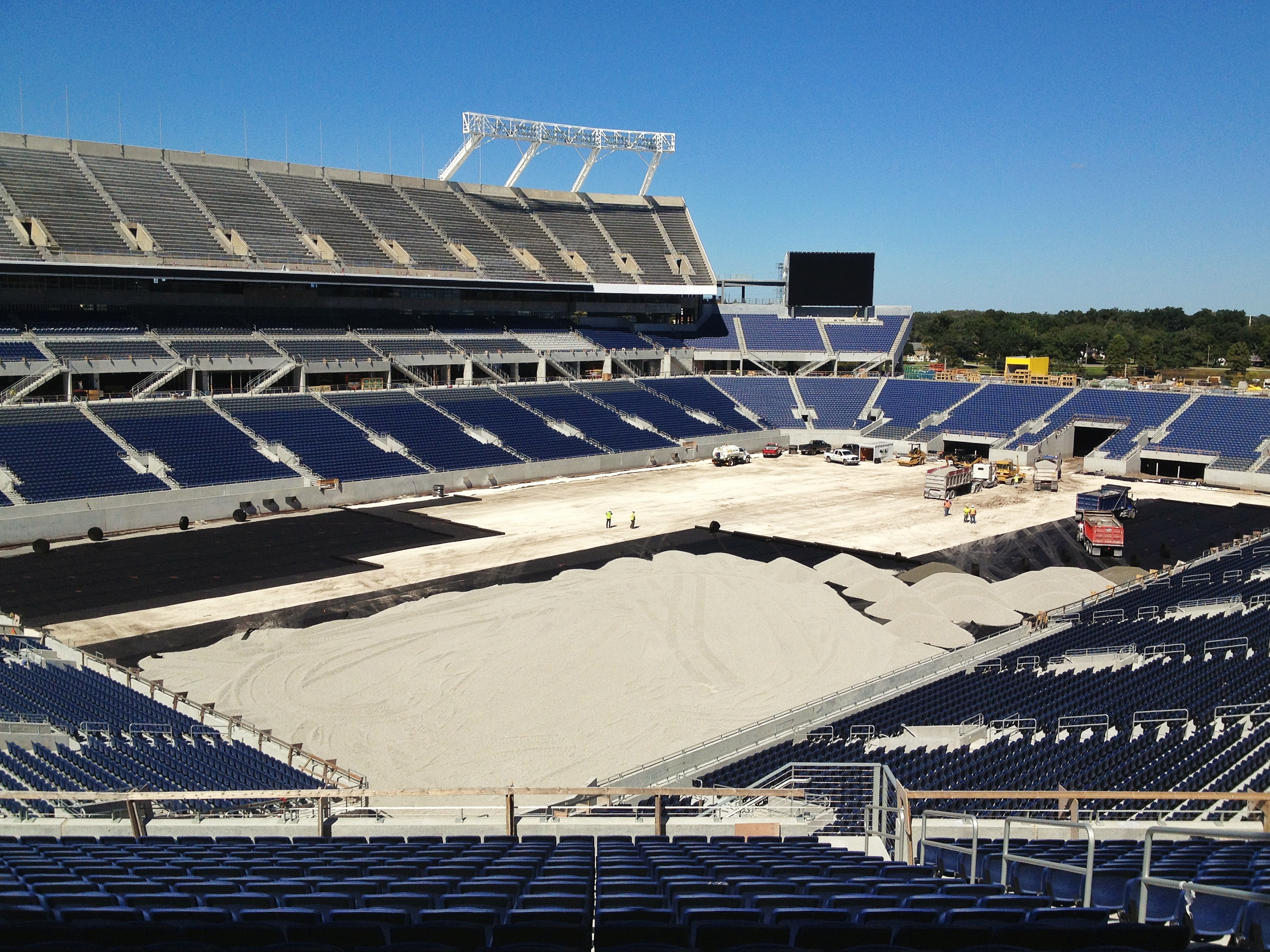
Renovation nearing completion in late 2014

In 2010, the natural grass surface was replaced with AstroTurf Gameday Grass 3D after the 2009 Champs Sports Bowl and 2010 Capital One Bowl were marred by poor field conditions that led to two football player injuries. Stadium conditions once again prompted a review of the stadiums condition. Finally, it was announced in May 2013 that the Florida Citrus Bowl Stadium would undergo a reconstruction during 2014, at a cost of less than US$200 million. The cost estimate as of March 2014 was US$207 million. The stadium's upper-level seating was retained, but the entire lower bowl structure was demolished.

In the newly reconstructed stadium there are two 360-degree concourses, a 20,000-square-foot (1,900 m^{2}) plaza deck ("Party Deck") in the north end zone, 41,000 all-new lower bowl seats with six additional inches of leg room & chairbacks, multiple giant video displays, new team facilities including locker rooms training rooms and attached media, new stadium operations facilities to allow better efficiency in food service, security, first aid and maintenance, new concessions and restrooms, and an open-air façade. The new mezzanine is now referred to as the "Plaza level". The upper deck, previously numbered the "300" level, is now numbered the "200" level.

The reconstruction began immediately following a groundbreaking event held at the stadium on January 29, 2014, and demolition of the entire lower bowl lasted 25 days. The first event at the renovated Camping World Stadium was the 2014 edition of the Florida Classic on November 22, 2014. The Bethune-Cookman Wildcats defeated the Florida A&M Rattlers, 18–17 in overtime.

Orlando City returned to the renovated Camping World Stadium for the 2015 season, their first season in Major League Soccer, while awaiting construction of their own soccer-specific stadium. In their first match, a 1–1 draw against fellow expansion team New York City FC on March 8, 2015, they drew a sellout crowd of 62,510, the largest attendance for a soccer match at the venue.

The United States women's national soccer team returned to Camping World Stadium on October 25, 2015. They defeated Brazil again, 3–1. The attendance of 32,869 was the largest attendance for a standalone USWNT friendly in the state of Florida.

The Orlando Pride, the expansion National Women's Soccer League team owned by Orlando City SC, played in Camping World Stadium until the Orlando City Stadium was complete. On April 23, 2016, they broke the record for attendance at an NWSL game, setting at 23,403, when the Pride beat the Houston Dash, 3–1.

On November 19, 2015, CONCACAF and CONMEBOL announced that Camping World Stadium would be one of the host venues for the Copa América Centenario soccer tournament in 2016.

On April 26, 2016, Florida Citrus Sports announced that they had sold naming rights for the stadium to Camping World. Camping World also became the title sponsor of the stadium's college football kickoff game through at least 2019, and the annual December bowl game held at the stadium was known as the Camping World Bowl from 2017 through 2019. These naming changes did not affect the Citrus Bowl or the Florida Classic.

In 2021, Camping World Stadium renovations included modernizing and improving the north endzone seating bowl, concession areas, club-level seating, and new premium mezzanine clubs on east and west. The project was completed on a fast-track schedule of less than 12 months by Construction Manager Barton Malow. During the work, the City of Orlando and Florida Citrus Sports hosted several events at the stadium. All were held without incident due to specialized safety techniques that separated construction activities, visitors, and staff.

Florida Citrus Sports released plans for a new renovation on November 14, 2023. Plans included demolition of the upper decks built in the 1980s, and replacing them with a new set of upper decks on the east, west, and south sides of the stadium, integrated with the lower bowl in a 360-degree concourse. The new upper decks would total 18,000 seats. The plans also included a 100,000-square-foot fieldhouse. The Orange County Board of County Commissioners approved $400 million in tourist development tax revenue for use in the renovation on January 23, 2024.

In July 2026, DLR Group revealed the final design for the renovation of the stadium, which would increase seating capacity from 63,000 to over 65,000, as well as add several new features including a North Endzone Tower enclosing the seating bowl, new and renovated suite and terrace levels, more escalators, premium seating, a North Endzone Club, more capacity and dining and amenity offerings in the terrace level, retractable seating in the south lower bowl for increasing concert capacity and other events, redesigned arrival sequences, stadium-wide audiovisual upgrades, and a new façade with integrated programmable lighting.

=== Seating and attendance ===
Prior to the 2014 renovation, the stadium had 65,000 permanent seats. The lower bowl lacked permanent seats in the north end zone, though temporary bleachers could be erected there if necessary. The temporary bleachers were last used for the 2005 Capital One Bowl, which had an attendance of 70,229.

Following the renovation, the seating capacity was reduced to 60,219 due to the introduction of chair-back seats in the lower bowl and Plaza Level. The upper deck continues to have bench seats. Temporary bleachers can be added in the Plaza level in place of the Party Deck to increase the capacity to 65,194.

== In popular culture ==
- Camping World Stadium (then still known as the Citrus Bowl) was a filming location for the 1998 Adam Sandler movie The Waterboy. In the film, the Citrus Bowl depicted both the home stadium of the fictional University of Louisiana Cougars as well as the venue of the climactic Bourbon Bowl game.
- Exterior shots of the then-Citrus Bowl were used in the television series Coach, starring Craig T. Nelson as Coach Hayden Fox. In the show, the Citrus Bowl was the home stadium of the fictional Orlando Breakers franchise, which Coach Fox led during the series' final two seasons (1995–1997). The change, which coincided with a production move to Disney-MGM Studios (now Disney's Hollywood Studios), reflected the real-life expansion team, the Jacksonville Jaguars.

== See also ==
- List of American football stadiums by capacity
- List of association football stadiums by capacity
- Lists of stadiums

Events and tenants
Preceded by first stadium ESPN Wide World of Sports Complex	Home of Orlando City SC; 2011 – 2013; 2015 – 2016	Succeeded by ESPN Wide World of Sports Complex; Orlando City Stadium
Preceded by first stadium	Home of Orlando Pride; 2016	Succeeded by Orlando City Stadium
Preceded by first stadium	Home of the Orlando Rage; 2001	Succeeded by last stadium
Preceded by MetLife Stadium	Home of the Orlando Guardians; 2023 – present	Succeeded by current
Preceded by first stadium	Home of the UCF Knights; 1979 – 2006	Succeeded by Spectrum Stadium
Preceded by Pro Player Stadium	Home of Russell Athletic Bowl; 2001 – present	Succeeded by current
Preceded by first stadium Florida Field	Home of Citrus Bowl; 1947 – 1972; 1974 – present	Succeeded by Florida Field current
Preceded by Bank of America Stadium	Host of the ACC Championship Game; 2016	Succeeded by Bank of America Stadium
Preceded by Aloha Stadium Allegiant Stadium	Host of the NFL Pro Bowl; 2017 – 2020 2024 - Present	Succeeded by Allegiant Stadium Current
Preceded by Ford Field; AT&T Stadium	Host of WrestleMania; 2008 (24); 2017 (33)	Succeeded by Reliant Stadium; Mercedes-Benz Superdome
Preceded by Memorial Stadium (Wichita Falls)	Host of the NCAA Division I-AA National Championship Game; 1979	Succeeded by Hughes Stadium
Preceded by Rich Stadium; Camp Randall Stadium	Host of the Drum Corps International; World Championship; 1996 – 1998; 2003	Succeeded by Camp Randall Stadium; Invesco Field at Mile High
