= John Hitt =

American academic (1940–2023)

John C. Hitt
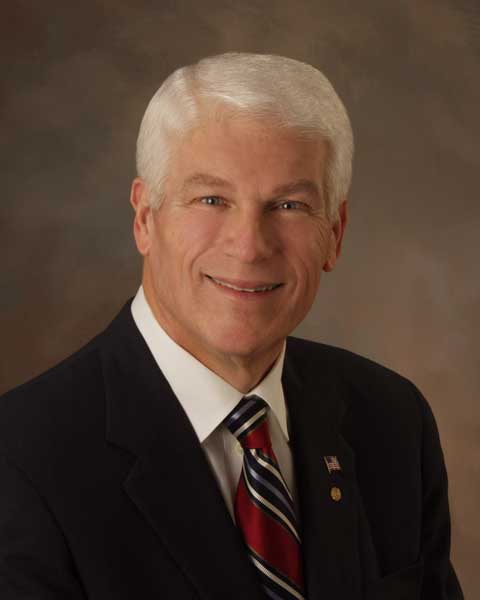

4th President of the University of Central Florida
- In office March 1, 1992 – June 30, 2018
- Preceded by: Robert A. Bryan (acting)
- Succeeded by: Dale Whittaker

Personal details
- Born: December 7, 1940 Houston, Texas, U.S.
- Died: February 20, 2023 (aged 82)
- Spouse: Martha Hitt (m. 1961)
- Children: 2
- Education: Austin College (BA); Tulane University (MS, PhD)
- Profession: Academic; administrator
- Website: Office of the President

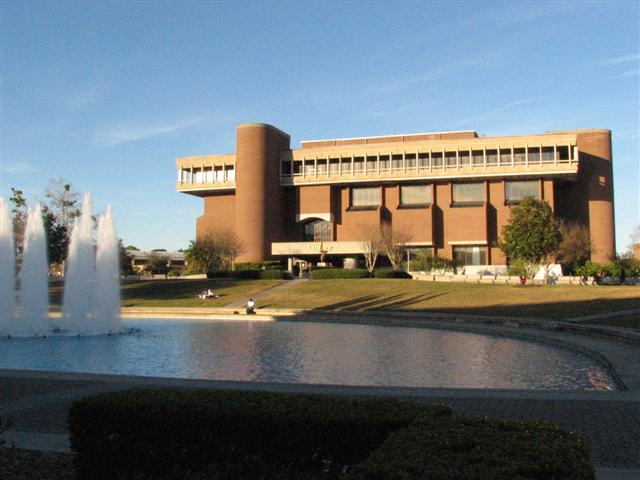
The John C. Hitt Library, with the Reflection Pond in the foreground

John C. Hitt (December 7, 1940 – February 20, 2023) was an American professor and academic administrator, who served as the fourth president of the University of Central Florida in Orlando, Florida from 1992 to 2018. He was named the Orlando Sentinel's Central Floridian of the Year in 2005, and twice Orlando's most powerful person by Orlando Magazine. He was the dean of Florida's university presidents, as the longest tenured president in the state. His reputation was materially tarnished by auditor findings that tens of millions of dollars were improperly spent on construction during his tenure as president. He acknowledged the spending and resigned from his compensated fundraising role. His successor Dale Whittaker and the university's chief financial officer Bill Merck also resigned because of the scandal. Four other financial officers were fired.

== Early life and career ==
Hitt grew up in Houston and graduated from Austin College in Sherman, Texas in 1962 with a bachelor of science degree in psychology. He continued his education at Tulane University, where he completed both his master of science and his PhD by 1966. He stayed at Tulane and became an assistant professor. In 1969, Hitt moved to Texas Christian University working as an associate professor of psychology. Three years later he became associate dean of the university, and in 1974 he became vice president of the school's research foundation. Soon afterwards he accepted the position of dean of the graduate school.

After serving as provost and vice president for academic affairs and professor of psychology at Bradley University in Illinois for ten years, he moved to the University of Maine in 1987 as vice president for academic affairs and professor of psychology. In 1991 he was named interim president of the school before accepting the presidency at the University of Central Florida.

== University of Central Florida presidency ==
Hitt was selected by the Florida Board of Regents to succeed Robert A. Bryan as UCF's president. Bryan had been serving in an interim capacity since June 1991 when Steven Altman stepped down as the university's third president.

After Hitt took office in spring 1992, UCF's enrollment was 20,302 and by fall 2013 it was 59,770 with students from more than 140 countries. Under Hitt's direction it raised admissions standards, increased research funding, built new facilities, and established notable partnerships with major research institutions.

Hitt's efforts increased the university's academic profile and brought in over a billion dollars in new construction, including Spectrum Stadium (now FBC Mortgage Stadium), the CFE Arena (now Acrisure Bounce House), and new on-campus housing. Hitt was instrumental in the development of the UCF College of Medicine at Lake Nona, and the formation of the Burnett Honors College, and the College of Graduate Studies. Under his leadership UCF became a "very high research activity" university as ranked by the Carnegie Foundation for the Advancement of Teaching, and the university's football program ascended to Division I-A (FBS) in 1996 and joined the American Athletic Conference (The American).

In October 2011, Hitt accepted a five-year contract extension. In 2012, the main campus library was renamed for him to celebrate his 20th anniversary as president of the university. In the same year he accepted a six percent raise and he offered faculty a half percent raise in 2013.

On October 24, 2017, Hitt announced he would retire on June 30, 2018.

== Death ==
Hitt died on February 20, 2023, at the age of 82.

Academic offices
Preceded by Steven Altman	Fourth President of the University of Central Florida; 1992–2018	Succeeded by Dale Whittaker
