= List of presidents of the University of Central Florida =

President of the University of Central Florida
- Incumbent; Alexander N. Cartwright since April 13, 2020
- Residence: Burnett House
- Appointer: Board of Trustees, with Board of Governors
- Term length: No term limit
- Inaugural holder: Charles N. Millican; December 1, 1965
- Website: www.president.ucf.edu

This list of presidents of the University of Central Florida includes all who have served as university presidents of the University of Central Florida since its founding in 1963. The University of Central Florida is a space-grant university located on a 1,415-acre (5.73 km^{2}) campus in Orlando, Florida. UCF is a member institution of the State University System of Florida and is the second-largest university in the United States. Although the institution was founded in 1963, the name officially changed to the University of Central Florida in 1978 from Florida Technological University.

The first president of the university was Charles Millican, who was appointed by the Board of Regents to create a new university in Central Florida. Realizing his goal when the first classes were held at FTU in the Fall of 1968, Millican would be followed by Trevor Colbourn and Steven Altman. The fourth president was John C. Hitt, who served from March 1, 1992, to June 30, 2018, the longest tenure of a UCF president. The fifth president was Dale Whittaker, formerly the university's provost and executive vice president. He resigned in February 2019, following an investigation regarding UCF's misuse of funds. The current president, Alexander Cartwright, became acting president on April 13, 2020. Cartwright previously served as chancellor of the University of Missouri.

== Powers and duties ==
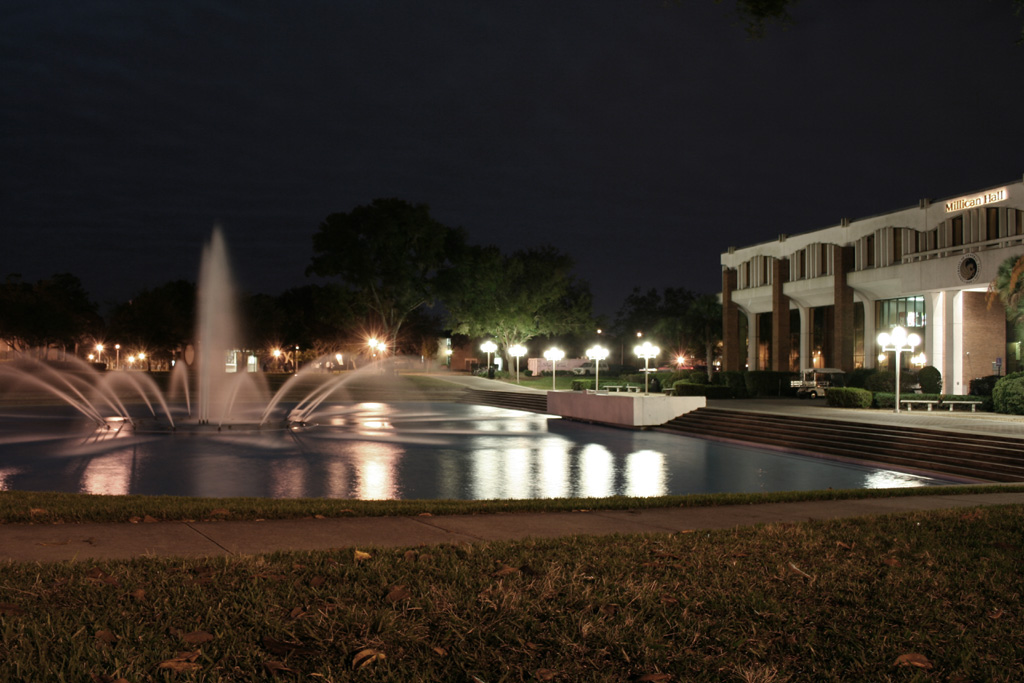
Millican Hall, named after UCF's first president, Dr. Charles Millican

The president of the University of Central Florida is the chief executive officer of the university. The university's Board of Trustees nominates the president, who must then be confirmed by the Florida Board of Governors. There is no limit set on how long a president may serve in office.

The president is responsible for the everyday operations of the university, as well as budget and program administration. They are responsible for consulting with the Board of Trustees, for setting the university's goals and mission, fiduciary policy and for creating appropriate committees and nominating deans and other executive officers of the university. In addition to serving as UCF's key spokesperson, the president is responsible for ultimately executing the rules and policies of the Board of Governors and Board of Trustees. The president reports to the chair of the board of trustees.

Though the University of Central Florida Athletic Association functions independently from the university, the president serves as the Chairman of the Athletics Association board, and appoints the majority of the board members. In addition, the president has the right to dissolve the Athletic Association as an independent entity at any time and bring it back under control of the UCF Board of Trustees.

The president's official office is located in Millican Hall on the university's main campus, and the president has the privilege of living in the Burnett House, also located on UCF's main campus in Orlando.

== List of presidents ==
Term	President	Background and accomplishments
First; 1965–1978		Dr. Charles N. Millican was the founding president of "Florida Technological University." As such, he chose the university slogan of "Reach for the Stars," helped to design the university's distinctive Pegasus logo, and devised the university's concentric circle design. One of the highlights of Millican's tenure, was the commencement address delivered by President Richard Nixon from the Reflecting Pond in 1973. Regarded as the "Father of UCF," Millican remained at the university following his retirement in 1978, earning the title "President Emeritus." Before his time at UCF, Millican was a pastor of Olive Branch Baptist Church in Mississippi, and served as a coordinator for the 44th College Training Detachment of the United States Army Air Forces during World War II.
Second; 1978–1989		Under the leadership of Dr. Trevor Colbourn, and as the diversification and growth of the university's academic programs grew away from its strictly technological and scientific beginnings, the university was renamed from Florida Technological University to University of Central Florida in 1978. During his tenure, the university established its football program, the Central Florida Research Park and numerous satellite branch campuses. Following his presidency, Colbourn returned to teaching full-time, earning the title "President Emeritus" and eventually assumed the role of University Historian.
Third; 1989–1991		Dr. Steven Altman's inauguration festivities, which were upbeat and filled with hopeful rhetoric following a tremendous rise in the university's image under Colbourn, included an address by Gennadi Gerasimov, a spokesman for Soviet leader Mikhail Gorbachev. During his short tenure as UCF's third president, the Knights Football program moved from NCAA Division II up to Division I-AA, and the athletics program moved to the America South Conference (presently the Sun Belt Conference).
Interim; 1991–1992		Dr. Robert A. Bryan became the interim president of the university following the resignation of Steven Altman, who left briefly into his tenure to return to the corporate workforce. Preceding his time at UCF, Bryan was a long-time faculty member of the University of Florida, and would serve as the university's interim president from 1989 to 1990. Bryan would subsequently serve as interim president once again, this time at the University of South Florida from 1993 to 1994.
Fourth; 1992–2018		UCF's fourth president, Dr. John C. Hitt presided over a university which doubled in terms of enrollment to become the nation's second-largest, increased its admission standards, and completed construction of an on-campus football stadium, new arena, and the development of the UCF College of Medicine at Lake Nona. In addition, the university's football program moved from Division I-AA to Division I-A (FBS) in 1996, and UCF became a "very high research activity" university as ranked by The Carnegie Foundation for the Advancement of Teaching. Before taking the reins at the UCF, he served as interim president and vice president at the University of Maine, and held other administrative positions at Bradley University and Texas Christian University.
Fifth; 2018–2019		UCF's fifth president, Dale Whittaker (A. Dale Whittaker), succeeded Hitt on July 1, 2018, having previously served as provost (2014–2018) and executive vice president (2015–2018). Whittaker focused on developing the nation's best talent and creating deeper partnerships across and beyond Central Florida. He led initiatives to increase diversity, inclusion and equity on campus; build new relationships in our community and deepen existing partnerships; and improve student learning, engagement and outcomes. On February 19, 2019, Whitaker announced his resignation amidst an investigation into the misuse of funds.
Interim; 2019–2020		Thad Seymour Jr. was confirmed as interim university president in March 2019, following Whittaker's resignation.
Sixth 2020–present		Alexander N. Cartwright became UCF's acting president on April 13, 2020, after previously serving as the chancellor of the University of Missouri and as provost and vice-chancellor of the State University of New York.

== Timeline of presidential terms ==
Presidents of the University of Central Florida

== See also ==
- University of Central Florida
- State University System of Florida
- List of University of Central Florida alumni
- List of University of Central Florida faculty and administrators
