= Leavens =

Surname list

Leavens is a surname. Notable people with the surname include:

- Bert Leavens (1886–1953), Canadian politician in Ontario
- Edmund Leavens Chandler (1829–1880), Canadian politician in Quebec
- Gary T. Leavens, American professor of computer science
- Henry Leavens (1836–1917), American politician in Wisconsin
