= Kendall Hunt Publishing Company =

American educational publisher

- Formerly: William C. Brown (1944–1961); William C. Brown Book Company (1961–1994)
- Company type: Private
- Industry: Publishing
- Founded: 1944; 82 years ago
- Founders: William C. Brown
- Headquarters: Dubuque, Iowa, U.S.
- Area served: United States, Canada
- Key people: Chad Chandlee (CEO)
- Products: Printed books, digital services
- Revenue: 37 million (estimated)
- Number of employees: 250
- Website: www.kendallhunt.com

Kendall Hunt is an independent educational publishing house founded in 1944 as William C. Brown Publishing. The company is based in Dubuque, Iowa, and is still owned by the Brown family.

== History ==
In 1944, William C. Brown acquired the rights to 26 book titles ranging from workbooks to laboratory manuals. Brown's company, William C. Brown Publishing, owned and operated all facets of textbook publishing, from original concept to shipping. The number of the titles in the company's catalog grew to more than 100 by 1949. By 1961, the company used the name W.C. Brown & Company, Publishers for the traditional publishing department and William C. Brown Book Company for authors with guaranteed publishing contracts. To eliminate the confusion between these two brands, the company was renamed Kendall Hunt Publishing Company in 1994. Kendall was a family name of Brown's.

In 1992 W.C. Brown & Company, Publishers was sold to the Times Mirror Company. In 2016, Kendall Hunt acquired the primary provider of religious education programs for Catholic parishes, schools and families, RCL Benziger. In 2020, Kendall Hunt acquired the publishing imprints Paradigm and JIST.

== Main focus ==
Kendall Hunt publishes books for K-12, higher education and religious education programs under the RCL Benziger brand. It offers more than 10,000 printed titles, including digital products under the Great River Learning brand.

=== Partnerships ===
For the K-12 market, Kendall Hunt has partnerships with Illustrative Mathematics and OpenSciEd. It also partners with Paradigm Education, the University of Chicago, the University of Connecticut and the William & Mary School of Education in the area of higher education.

== Authors ==
- Amir Abbas Fakhravar
- Jonathan Maberry
- Charles Negy
- Dorothy Priesing
