= Charles N. Millican =

American academic (1916–2010)

1st President of the University of Central Florida
- In office December 1, 1965 – January 31, 1978
- Preceded by: Position established
- Succeeded by: Trevor Colbourn

Personal details
- Born: October 9, 1916 Wilson, Arkansas, U.S.
- Died: December 1, 2010 (aged 94) Orlando, Florida, U.S.
- Spouse: Frances Hilliard
- Education: Union University (B.S.); George Peabody College (M.A.); University of Florida (Ph.D.)
- Profession: Professor

Charles Norman Millican (October 9, 1916 – December 1, 2010) was an American professor and academic administrator. He was the founding president of the University of Central Florida, then named Florida Technological University.

== Family and Education ==
Charled N. Millican was born in Wilson, Arkansas. During his early year, he worked as a part time reporter for Dun & Bradstreet while studying business and religion at Union University. After graduating in 1941 with a Bachelor of science degree, he was appointed pastor of Olive Branch Baptist Church in Mississippi.

Millican later entered the Southern Baptist Theological Seminary in Kentucky. But, he returned to Jackson, Mississippi, to serve as a coordinator for the 44th College Training Detachment of the United States Army Air Forces from 1943 to 1945.

He married Frances Hilliard on May 15, 1945 in Jackson, Tennessee.

Before focusing on his work as an educator, he served as a pastor at a dozen congregations in Tennessee, Mississippi, and Florida.

Millican returned to school, and in 1946 earned his Master of Arts degree in economics from George Peabody College, then joining the Commerce Department at his alma mater Union University. He would move south to Gainesville, Florida, in 1948, to earn a Ph.D. in business finance and economics from the University of Florida. Millican joined the university faculty, and was appointed the assistant dean of the Warrington College of Business Administration in 1956. Soon thereafter, he left for Texas where he became dean of the School of Business Administration at Hardin-Simmons University.

In 1959 he moved to Tampa, Florida, to become dean of the College of Business Administration at the University of South Florida.

== University of Central Florida presidency ==
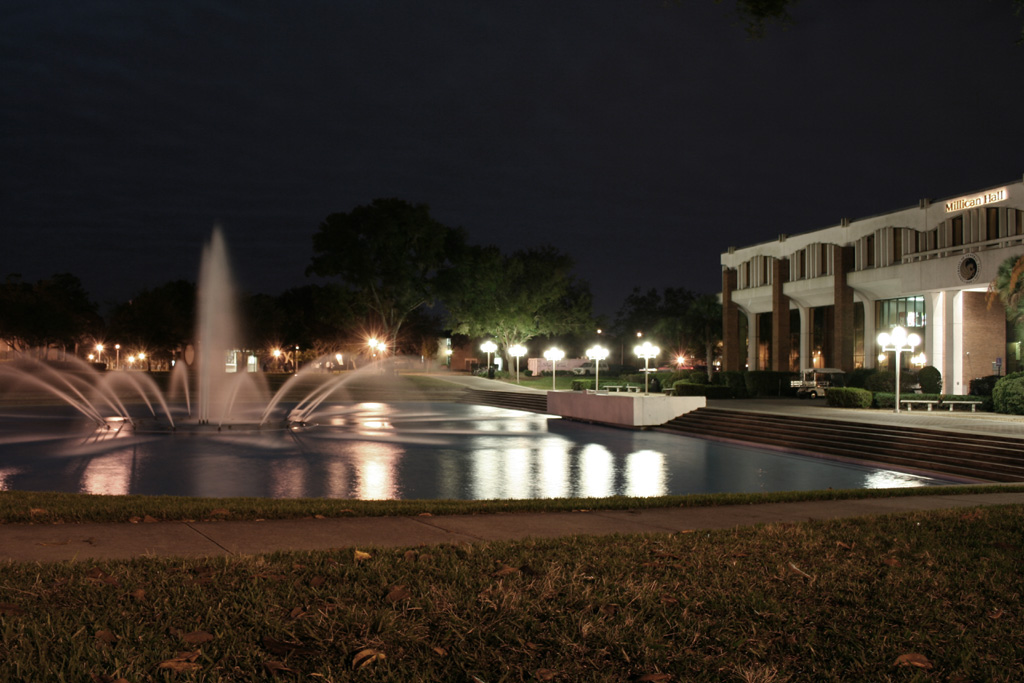
Millican Hall, UCF's administration building

On October 19, 1965, Millican was appointed as the founding president of a new state university in Florida, then without a name or even a campus. Millican, with the advice of a citizen advisory group, selected the name "Florida Technological University," though it is now known as the University of Central Florida. The campus site he selected was just east of Orlando, Florida. He is also credited with establishing twin tenets for the university, "Accent on the Individual" and "Accent on Excellence." Millican also chose the new university's motto: "Reach for the Stars." And, he was a co-designer of its distinctive "Pegasus" seal. The highlight of Millican's presidency was at his new university's commencement ceremonies in 1973, when he played host to President Richard Nixon.

Millican stepped-down as university president on January 31, 1978, but remained on the faculty. He was given the title of "President Emeritus," and taught classes in finance. Due to his role in shaping the university, Millican is considered by many to be the "Father of UCF."

== Later years ==
After leaving UCF, Millican served as the president of nearby Lake Highland Preparatory School from 1982 to 1985, and continued as president emeritus-consultant until 1993. Millican returned to serve the University in 1993 as president emeritus and special assistant to the chief executive officer of the UCF Foundation. Millican died on December 1, 2010, at his home in Central Florida.

== See also ==
- List of University of Central Florida faculty and administrators
