= Trevor Colbourn =

Australian professor & academic (1927-2015)

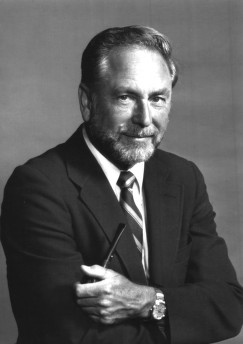

2nd President of the University of Central Florida
- In office 1 July 1978 – 30 June 1989
- Preceded by: Charles N. Millican
- Succeeded by: Steven Altman

Personal details
- Born: 24 February 1927 Armidale, New South Wales, Australia
- Died: 12 January 2015 (aged 87) Winter Park, Florida, United States
- Spouse: Beryl Evans
- Children: Two
- Education: University of London (B.A.); College of William and Mary (M.A.); Johns Hopkins University (Ph.D.)
- Profession: Professor, historian

Harold Trevor Colbourn (24 February 1927 – 12 January 2015) was an Australian professor and academic administrator, who served as the second president of the University of Central Florida, previously named Florida Technological University.

== Early life and career ==
Colbourn was born in Armidale, New South Wales, Australia on 24 February 1927. As a young man, Colbourn and his family moved to England where he earned a Bachelor of Arts degree in history at the University of London. Colbourn then moved to the United States, where he graduated with a Master of Arts in history from the College of William and Mary and a doctorate in history from Johns Hopkins University.

Colbourn taught history at Penn State University and Indiana University Bloomington before he becoming the graduate dean at the University of New Hampshire in 1967. In 1973, he was appointed Academic Vice President of San Diego State University and served as Acting President from 1977 to 1978.

He published The Lamp of Experience : Whig History and the Intellectual Origins of the American Revolution in 1974.

== University of Central Florida presidency ==
On 1 July 1978, Colbourn took office as the second president of the University of Central Florida (UCF). He was appointed by the Florida Board of Regents on 9 January 1978, to succeed Charles N. Millican, the founding president of UCF. Under his leadership, and as the university's academic programs diversified and grew away from its strictly technological and scientific beginnings, Colbourn suggested that the university be renamed. In 1978, Governor Reubin Askew approved the change of name from Florida Technological University to the University of Central Florida. He established the university's football program, honors program, the Central Florida Research Park and numerous satellite branch campuses. During his tenure, enrollment increased from around 11,000 in 1978 to over 18,000 in 1989.

Colbourn stepped-down as university president in June 1989, but remained on the faculty. He was given the title of "President Emeritus" in 1990 and taught classes in history. Colbourn retired from UCF in 2006 but still remained active in the university community.

== Personal life ==
Colbourn married Beryl Evans in 1949, and has two daughters. He enjoyed swimming, listening to opera and symphony music. He died at the age of 87 on 12 January 2015.

== See also ==
- List of University of Central Florida faculty and administrators
