= Confederación de Unidad Sindical de Guatemala =

National trade union center in Guatemala

CUSG
- Confederación de Unidad Sindical de Guatemala
- Founded: 1983
- Headquarters: Guatemala City
- Location: Guatemala
- Affiliations: ITUC

The Confederación de Unidad Sindical de Guatemala (CUSG) is a national trade union center in Guatemala. It is affiliated with the International Trade Union Confederation.
