= OpenSciEd =

OpenSciEd is an American nonprofit organization that designs and disseminates open source science instructional materials for grades K–12. Its work supports the implementation of the Next Generation Science Standards (NGSS) by providing phenomena-based learning experiences that are freely available and field-tested in classrooms across the United States. OpenSciEd's approach is based on a science storyline, where students build upon their understanding of a topic by asking questions and investigating their answers through various activities. The development of the instructional materials was supported in visioning and field testing by 10 states. All materials are reviewed by EdReports and follow Next Generation Science Standards.

== Participating States ==
OpenSciEd was initially supported by a consortium of ten state education agencies that helped pilot and field-test early units. Since then, adoption has expanded, and the curriculum is now being implemented statewide or in district-led initiatives in many states including California, Iowa, Louisiana, Massachusetts, Michigan, New Jersey, New Mexico, Oklahoma, Rhode Island, and Washington.

== History and Funding ==
OpenSciEd began as a multi-state initiative supported by state education agencies and philanthropic partners. Early development and field testing were supported by several foundations, including the Bill & Melinda Gates Foundation, Carnegie Corporation of New York, Charles and Lynn Schusterman Family Philanthropies, and the William and Flora Hewlett Foundation. In 2025, OpenSciEd became an independent California nonprofit public benefit corporation.

== Approach to Teaching and Learning ==
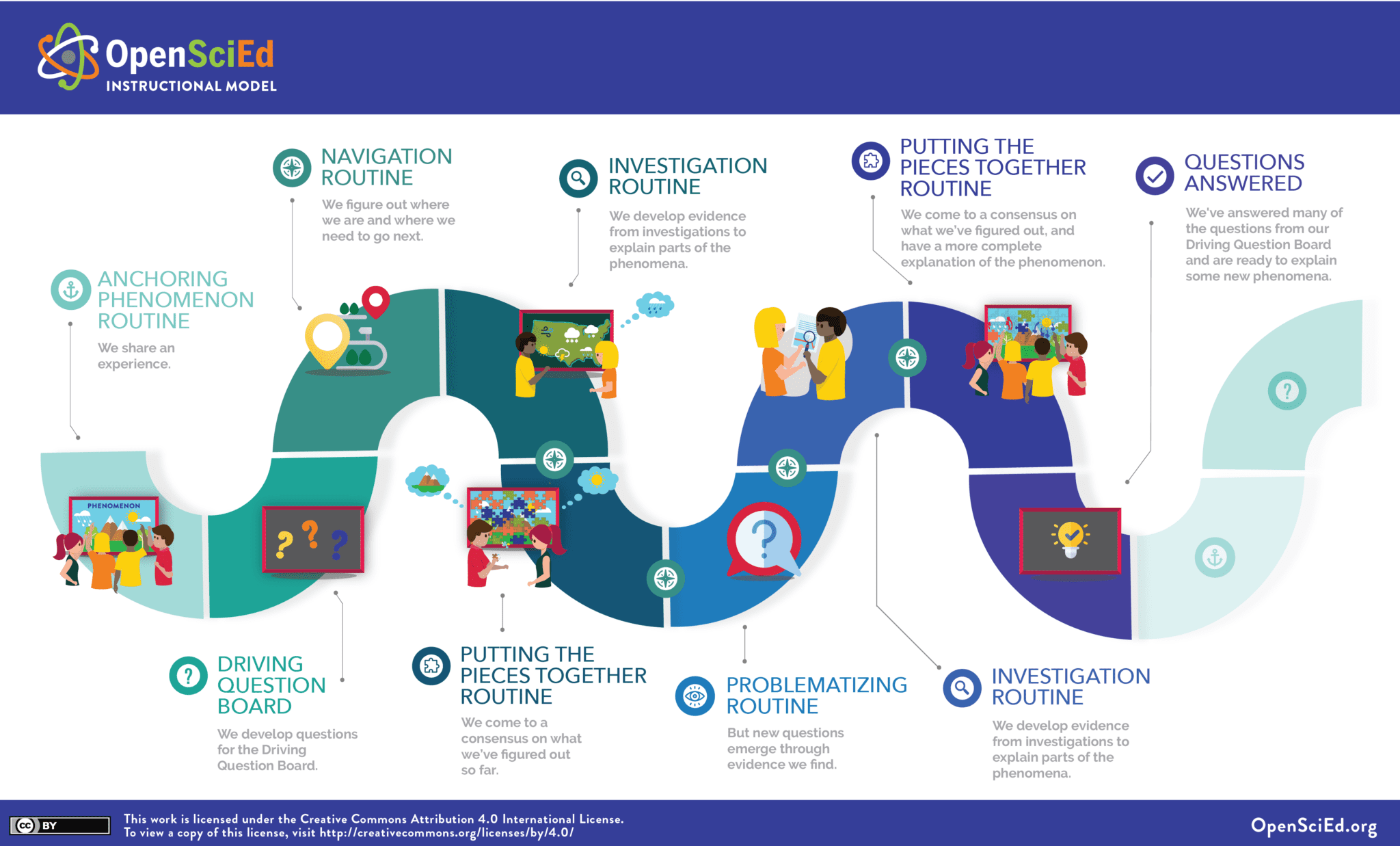
OpenSciEd model of instruction.

OpenSciEd’s instructional model aims to shift science education from rote memorization to student-driven exploration. According to the organization, traditional science instruction often emphasizes expert perspectives and isolated facts, which can make it difficult for students to understand the relevance of what they are learning.

By contrast, OpenSciEd units begin with compelling, real-world phenomena that spark curiosity. Students generate questions, engage in hands-on and minds-on investigations, construct explanations using evidence, and develop increasingly sophisticated understandings through coherent instructional sequences. This storyline-based model supports deeper engagement, equity of voice in classrooms, and stronger connections between science concepts.

The curriculum also includes embedded supports for multilingual learners, students with disabilities, and others who have historically been underserved by conventional science education.
