= Steven Altman =

American professor and academic administrator

President of the NewSchool of Architecture and Design
- In office May 2006 – 2013
- Succeeded by: Greg Marick

3rd President of the University of Central Florida
- In office July 6, 1989 – June 10, 1991
- Preceded by: Trevor Colbourn
- Succeeded by: Robert A. Bryan (acting)

President of Texas A&M University–Kingsville
- In office 1985 – 1989

Personal details
- Born: October 24, 1945 (age 80) United States
- Spouse: Judy Ellen Ovadenko
- Education: University of California, Los Angeles (B.A.); University of Southern California (M.B.A. & D.B.A.)
- Profession: Professor

Steven Altman is an American professor and academic administrator. He served as president of NewSchool of Architecture and Design in San Diego, California, from 2006 to 2013. He previously served as the third president of the University of Central Florida from 1989 to 1991.

== Academic career ==
Altman was assistant dean at the School of Business, University of Southern California from 1969 to 1972. He was an assistant professor in the Division of Management at Florida International University from 1972 to 1976 and also served as the chairman of the Division of Management from 1972 to 1977. At Florida International University, he was Assistant Vice President of Academic Affairs from 1977 to 1978, and Vice President of Academic Affairs from 1981 to 1985, while also serving as Provost from 1982 to 1985.

In 1985, he was appointed President of Texas A & I University (now Texas A&M University–Kingsville) where he remained until 1989 when he joined the University of Central Florida as its third president. Altman resigned hurriedly in June 1991 so he could become president of Medical Telecommunications Associates, shortly after allegations of him using escort services were uncovered by the Orlando Sentinel. He was appointed president of NewSchool of Architecture and Design in May 2006.

Altman is the author of 13 books and more than two dozen articles on management, leadership, education, health care, and organization development. He has won several awards for outstanding teaching and professional leadership and has been a neutral arbitrator for the American Arbitration Association.
