= Canadian University Science Games =

The Canadian University Science Games (CUSG) are an annual, student-led initiative designed to bring together undergraduate university science students from across Canada. The four-day conference consists of guest speakers, competitive challenges, and social events. Currently the games are under a restructuring phase - the Games are seeking registered Canadian charity status to add continuity from year to year. The Games currently have no website.

== About CUSG ==
Teams of students (usually numbering 20) gather at the host university for the four-day event. Teams are assigned points based on their performance at competitive challenges, as well as for their enthusiasm throughout the event. Among participants, the games are informally known as "the Science Olympics". Each CUSG consists of 6 competitive challenges. In the past, these have included debate, visual arts, "Cascade" (Construction of a Rube-Goldberg Machine), sport, a scavenger hunt and a quiz bowl.

== History ==
A student initiative at the McGill University in 1999 is regarded to be the first CUSG. In the past, the event has been hosted by:

1999 McGill University
2000 University of Toronto
2001 University of Western Ontario
2002 Concordia University
2003 Laval University
2004 University of Ottawa
2005 University of Montreal (Cancelled)
2006 University of Windsor
2007 University of Waterloo/Wilfrid Laurier University (Cancelled)
2008 (Cancelled)
2009 University of Windsor
2013 University of Western Ontario
2014 TBD

=== 2006 ===
The 2006 event, held at the University of Windsor, was regarded by many as a huge success. A record number of participants attended, and there was no financial shortfall. These games were sponsored by the Michener Institute, the University of Windsor, and various other organizations.

=== 2007 ===
In 2007, students from the University of Waterloo and Wilfrid Laurier University were to collaborate and host the games in Kitchener-Waterloo, Ontario. A notice appeared on the games' website, a few months before the games occurred, that they would not be held due to lack of sponsorship.

https://web.archive.org/web/20131104092913/http://www.gazette.uwo.ca/article.cfm?articleID=906&day=30&month=11&section=News&year=2006

== Results ==
Since no formal records of the event are kept, the only verification for results are the physical awards, each owned and possessed by students of the respective winning team. The following results are accepted:

Year: 2006
Host: University of Windsor
1st: University of Windsor
2nd: University of Waterloo
3rd: University of Western Ontario, Team 3
"Cascade Challenge": University of Waterloo
Spirit Award: Wilfrid Laurier University

Year: 2004
Host: University of Ottawa
1st: Laval University
2nd: University of Waterloo
3rd: Unknown
Academic Award: McGill University
"Cascade Challenge": University of Western Ontario
Spirit Award: University of Western Ontario

Year: 2003
Host: Laval University
1st: University of Montreal
2nd: University of Windsor
3rd: Unknown
Academic Award: McGill University
"Cascade Challenge":
Spirit Award: Wilfrid Laurier University

== Contest ==
For the duration of the games, all participants from all schools, including the host school, are housed in one hotel. All meals are usually provided by the hosting students. Corporate and institutional sponsorship usually subsidizes the financial cost of the games.

== Website ==
The corporation had a presence on the Internet at www.cusg.ca, until July 25, 2007, when the domain name was left unregistered and was bought by a cybersquatter
