= Charles Negy =

American psychologist

Academic background
- Education: Texas A&M University

Academic work
- Discipline: Psychology
- Institutions: University of Central Florida

Charles Negy is an American psychologist. He is an associate professor of psychology at the University of Central Florida. Beginning in June 2020, Negy was placed under investigation for misconduct. His position at the university has been at the center of controversy over tweets about a supposed and subsequent hostile learning environment in his classes reported by students. In May 2022, an arbitrator ordered his re-instatement.

== Biography ==
Negy received his Ph.D. in clinical psychology from Texas A&M University in 1994. He has since been working for the University of Central Florida where he received employment in Fall of 1998. During his time at the University of Central Florida, Negy has also worked for three years as a psychologist along the Texas-Mexico border, serving low-income Mexican American families.

In December 2009, the University of Central Florida recognized Negy as a recipient of the 2008-2009 Teaching Incentive Program Awards for faculty excellence.

Negy received criticism after tweeting remarks about "black privilege" during the George Floyd protests, resulting in a petition for his termination from the University of Central Florida, which garnered over 26,000 signatures. Beginning in June 2020, Negy was placed under investigation for misconduct. On January 13, 2021, UCF announced that it intended to fire him for creating a hostile classroom environment, failing to report a sexual assault, deterring students from filing complaints, and providing false information during his investigation. Soon after, he was fired. In May 2022, that firing was overruled by an arbitrator, ordering that he be reinstated with tenure. The university accepted the ruling and said he would resume teaching in the Fall semester of 2022.

Patricia Tolley from Nicholson Student Media reported on June 14, 2022, that "there are currently no classes available with Negy yet, and there is no determined date for his return to the classroom."

== Selected works ==
=== Books ===
- Negy, Charles. (2020). White Shaming: Bullying based on Prejudice, Virtue-Signaling, and Ignorance. Kendall Hunt. ISBN 978-1-7924-0785-7. OCLC 1140713175.
