= Dale Whittaker =

American University President and Academic

President of the University of Central Florida
- In office July 1, 2018 – February 19, 2019
- Preceded by: John Hitt
- Succeeded by: Thad Seymour Jr.

Executive vice president of the University of Central Florida
- In office 2015–2018

Provost of the University of Central Florida
- In office 2014–2015

Personal details
- Born: August 13, 1961 (age 65) Kewanee, Illinois
- Spouse: Mary Whittaker
- Children: 2
- Education: B.S., Texas A&M University; M.S., PhD., 1987, Purdue University

A. Dale Whittaker (born August 13, 1961) is an American academic and senior program officer at the Bill and Melinda Gates Foundation. He was the fifth president of the University of Central Florida. He succeeded former president John Hitt in 2018, but resigned less than a year later after an investigation of the university for “misuse or planned misuse of nearly $85 million in operating funds for construction.” He was later found to be not involved in the misuse of funds. The state also later reversed its previous rules regarding these types of funds.

== Early life and education ==
Whittaker was born on August 13, 1961, in Kewanee, Illinois. He earned his Bachelor of Science degree from Texas A&M University before attending Purdue University for his master's degree and PhD. After earning his master's degree, Whittaker was hired at Texas Instruments for their artificial intelligence development group where he was awarded a USDA National Needs Fellowship for post-secondary education.

== Career ==
Whittaker joined the faculty of agriculture engineering at Texas A&M University in 1987 before leaving to join his alma mater Purdue University in 2002. He joined Purdue as their associate dean of the School of Agriculture and director of academic programs. In 2010, he was promoted to their vice provost for undergraduate academic affairs, although he left four years later to become the provost of the University of Central Florida (UCF). Prior to the completion of his first year at UCF, Whittaker was promoted to provost and executive vice president.

Due to his administrative success and academic background, Whittaker was named a finalist for the position of Iowa State University president in 2017. He eventually withdrew from consideration in order to keep his "momentum moving forward at the University of Central Florida." The following year, Whittaker succeeded John Hitt to become the fifth President of the University of Central Florida. His presidency would only last 236 days before he formally resigned from the position. His resignation was the result of internal probes into the illegality of state funds used on infrastructure. Prior to Whittaker becoming president, UCF had inappropriately used leftover state operating funds for construction projects. An independent report delivered in January 2019 found that while Whittaker was never informed of the illegal financing, the Board would often approve projects with little concern to the access of funds. With UCF threatened with penalties and state senator Randy Fine proposing to close the university, Whittaker offered his resignation as president to calm the ongoing issues.

Whittaker joined the Bill & Melinda Gates Foundation in September 2020 to "work with colleges and universities to increase opportunities for first-generation college students, students of color and students from low-income families."

== Personal life ==
Whittaker and his wife Mary have two children together. His wife is a member of the Orlando Modern Quilt Guild and helped UCF establish their own "Human Library."

Whittaker is a musician who plays the harmonica and often joined in with Valencia College president Sandy Shugart's band.

Academic offices
Preceded by John Hitt	Fifth President of the University of Central Florida; 2018–2019	Succeeded by Thad Seymour Jr.
