= Gary T. Leavens =

American computer scientist

Gary Leavens

Academic background
- Education: University of Michigan (BS); University of Southern California (MS); Massachusetts Institute of Technology (PhD)

Academic work
- Discipline: Computer science
- Sub-discipline: Specification language Information assurance Object-oriented programming Type theory Computer science education
- Institutions: Iowa State University; University of Central Florida

Gary T. Leavens is an American academic working as a professor of computer science at the University of Central Florida.

== Education ==
Leavens earned a Bachelor of Science in computer and communication science from the University of Michigan, a Master of Science in computer science from the University of Southern California, and a PhD in philosophy from the Massachusetts Institute of Technology.

== Career ==
From 1977 to 1984, Leavens worked on the technical staff at Bell Labs. From 1989 until 2007, he was a professor of computer science at Iowa State University. His scholarship focuses on behavioral interface specification languages (BISLs) such as Larch/Smalltalk, Larch/C++, and JML. Leavens was the program chair for 2009 OOPSLA.
