= University of Central Florida College of Graduate Studies =

Coordinates: 28°35′57″N 81°12′08″W

College of Graduate Studies
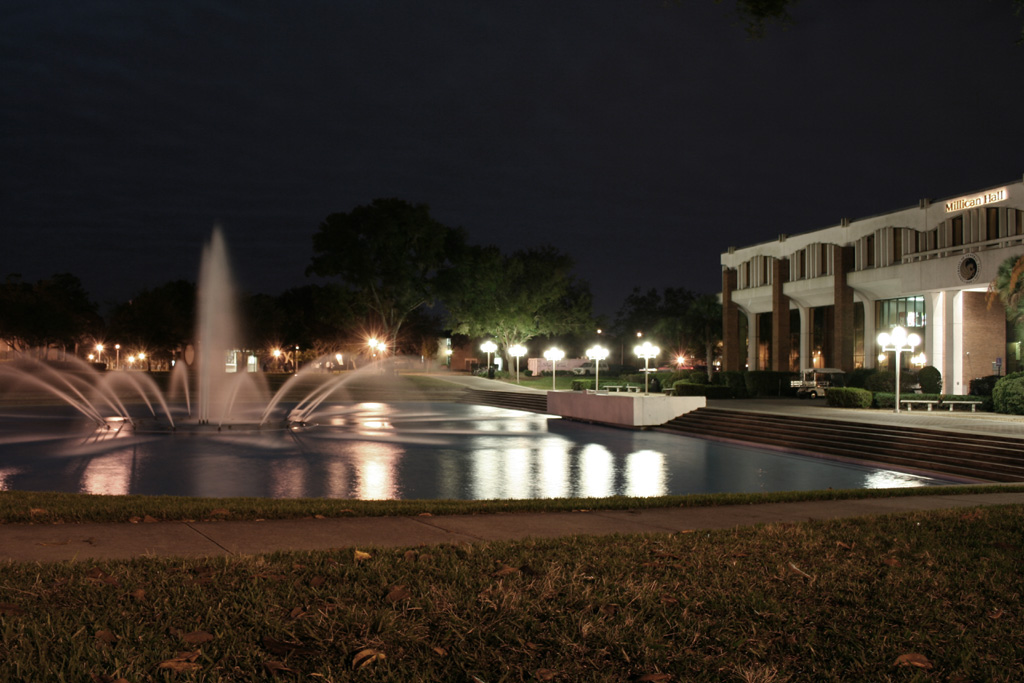
- Type: Public
- Established: August 8, 2008; 17 years ago
- Dean: John Weishampel, Ph.D.
- Academic staff: 1,923
- Postgraduates: 10,120 (Fall 2025)
- Address: Trevor Colbourn Hall, Suite 205A, Orlando, Florida, United States
- Website: graduate.ucf.edu

The University of Central Florida College of Graduate Studies is an academic college of the University of Central Florida located in Orlando, Florida, United States. The college confers most professional and research master's degrees and doctoral degrees in various fields of study for the university. The departments under which instruction and research occur are housed in UCF's other schools and colleges. The administrative offices for the College of Graduate Studies are located in Trevor Colbourn Hall, Suite 205A, on UCF's main campus. The dean of the college is John Weishampel PhD.

Originally called the Division of Graduate Studies, in August 2008 the UCF Board of Trustees changed the name to "College of Graduate Studies" to better reflect the school's responsibilities for graduate education.

For decades, the Division of Graduate Studies was housed in Millican Hall, which now includes the Graduate Student Center – a social, study, presentation, and collaborative work study area for graduate students and the Office of Postdoctoral Affairs. Graduate faculty consists of members within the university faculty – organized in their colleges into "disciplines" representing their distinct subject areas – who have been so designated by their respective departments or schools and approved by the dean of the College of Graduate Studies. Students apply for admission to a specific field, although once admitted, students are not limited to that field when selecting courses or faculty to serve on the committee supervising the student's research. The College of Medicine confers M.D.'s, but not Ph.D. degrees. The college offers more than 200 graduate program options. UCF ranks fifth among Florida's state universities in total graduate enrollment.

== Degrees ==
=== College of Graduate Studies ===
==== Doctorates ====
- Doctor of Philosophy (Ph.D.)
Subjects

Arts and Humanities:

Texts and Technology

Business Administration:

Business Administration

Community Innovation and Education:

Criminal Justice, Education, Public Affairs,

Engineering and Computer Science:

Aerospace Engineering, Biomedical Engineering, Civil Engineering, Computer Engineering, Computer Science, Electrical Engineering, Environmental Engineering, Industrial Engineering, Materials Science and Engineering, Mechanical Engineering, Modeling and Simulation

Interdisciplinary:

Interdisciplinary Studies, Nanotechnology

Health Professions and Science:

Kinesiology

Hospitality Management:

Hospitality Management

Nursing:

Nursing

Optics and Photonics:

Optics and Photonics

Sciences:

Big Data Analytics, Chemistry, Clinical Psychology, Human Factors and Cognitive Psychology, Industrial and Organization Psychology, Integrative and Conservation Biology, Mathematics, Physics, Security Studies, Sociology, Strategic Communication

- Doctor of Education (Ed.D.)
Subjects

Community Innovation and Education:

Curriculum and Instruction, Education and Leadership

- Doctor of Nursing Practice (DNP)
- Doctor of Physical Therapy (DPT)

Conferred by related UCF colleges

- Doctor of Medicine (M.D.) (College of Medicine)

==== Specialist degrees ====
- Education specialist (Ed.S.)

==== Master's degrees ====
- Master of Arts (M.A.)
- Master of Arts in Teaching (MAT)
- Master of Business Administration (MBA, MSBM)
- Master of Education (MEd)
- Master of Emergency and Crisis Management (MECM)
- Master of Engineering (MSAE, MSCE, MSEE, MSIE, MSME, MSCpE, MSEnvE, MSMBE)
- Master of Fine Arts (MFA)
- Master of Health Administration (MHA)
- Master of Nonprofit Management (MNM)
- Master of Public Administration (MPA)
- Master of Public Policy (MPP)
- Master in Research Administration (MRA)
- Master of Real Estate (MSRE)
- Master of Science (M.S.)
- Master of Science in Nursing (MSN)
- Master of Science in Management (MSM)
- Master of Social Work (MSW)
- Master of Sport Business Management (MSBM)

==== Graduate certificates ====
- Offered in multiple programs
