= University of Central Florida College of Engineering and Computer Science =

College of the University of Central Florida in USA

Coordinates: 28°36′07″N 81°11′54″W

College of Engineering and Computer Science
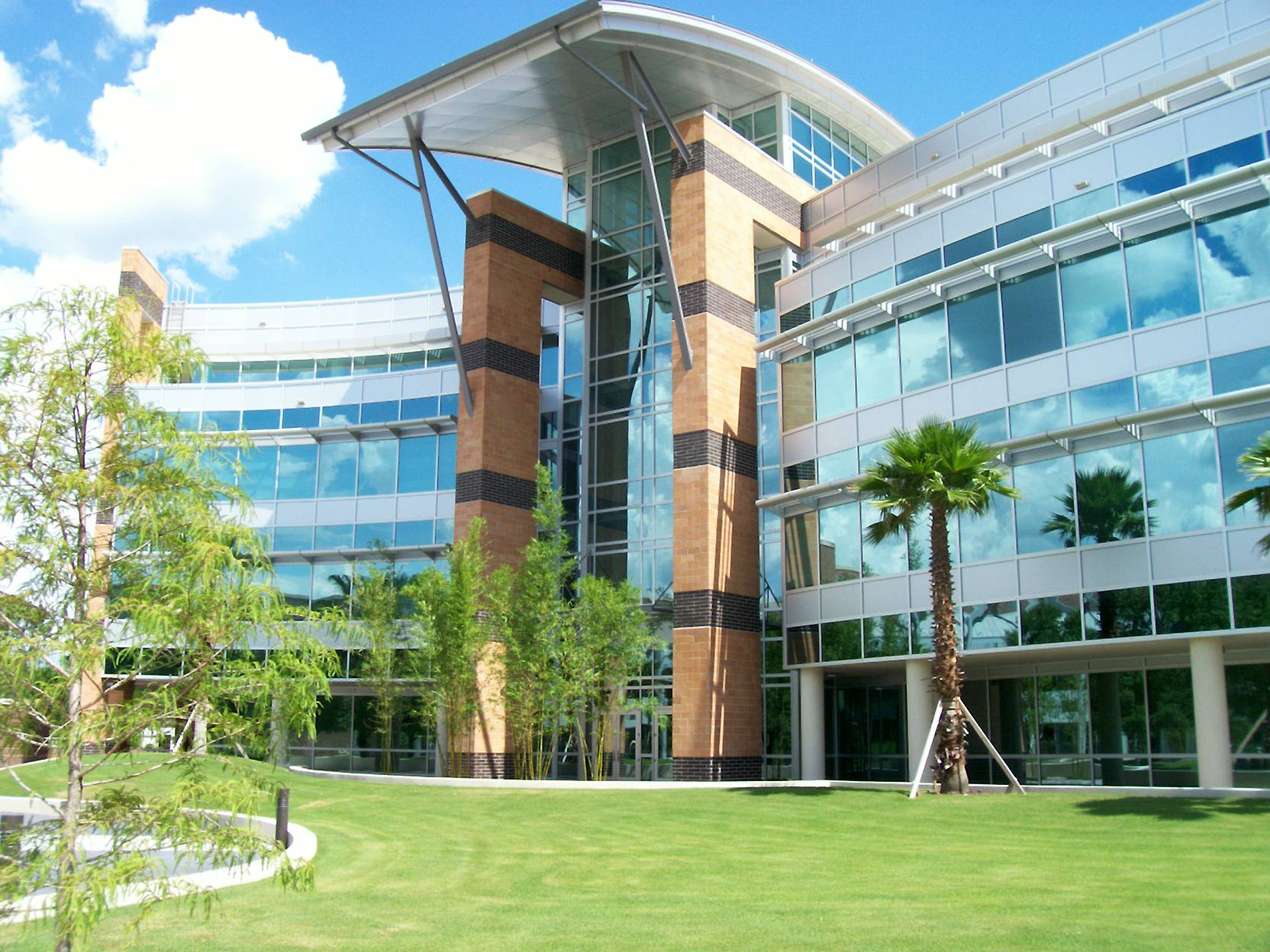
- Type: Public
- Established: 1966; 60 years ago
- Dean: Michael Georgiopoulos, Ph.D.
- Undergraduates: 6,098
- Postgraduates: 1,335
- Location: Orlando, Florida, United States
- Website: Official site

The University of Central Florida College of Engineering and Computer Science is an academic college of the University of Central Florida located in Orlando, Florida, United States. The college offers degrees in engineering, computer science, information technology and management systems, and houses UCF's Department of Electrical Engineering and Computer Science. The dean of the college is Michael Georgiopoulos, Ph.D.

UCF is listed as a university with "very high research activity" by The Carnegie Foundation for the Advancement of Teaching. With an enrollment of over 7,500 undergraduate and graduate students as of the fall of 2012, the college is one of the premier engineering schools in the United States. The college is recognized by U.S. News & World Report as one of the nation's best engineering schools, and as one of the world's best in the ARWU rankings. The university has made noted research contributions to modeling and simulation, digital media, and engineering and computer science.

== History ==
The College of Engineering and Computer Science was one of the four original academic colleges when UCF began classes in 1968 as Florida Technological University. The State University System of Florida's Board of Regents approved the creation of a college of engineering on September 16, 1966. The college was launched as the university's College of Engineering and Technologies on March 28, 1969.

The college saw the completion of a third Engineering Building which was designed in 2000-2002 for the School of EECS with a $15 million allocation from the State of Florida. In 2005, Harris Corporation donated $3 million to the College of Engineering & Computer Science, which was named the Harris Corporation Engineering Center.

== Academics ==
Housing some of the university's showcase majors, the College of Engineering and Computer Science is made up of the following departments:

- Civil, Environmental, and Construction Engineering (CECE)
- Computer Science (CS) and Information Technology (IT)
- Electrical and Computer Engineering (ECE)
- Industrial Engineering & Management Systems (IEMS)
- Mechanical and Aerospace Engineering (MAE)
- Materials Science and Engineering (MSE)

The college has 13 undergraduate programs, 14 master's degree programs, and eight doctoral degree programs. UCF has been classified as a research university (very high research activity) by the Carnegie Foundation for the Advancement of Teaching. The Graduate School of the College of Engineering & Computer Science is ranked #70 in the Top 100 engineering schools by the U.S. News & World Report. It also featured/features in the Top 100 Engineering/Technology and Computer Sciences schools in the world in the ARWU by Shanghai Jiao Tong University.

The college consists of the Department of Electrical Engineering & Computer Science (EECS), the Civil, Environmental, and Construction Engineering (CECE) Department, the Industrial Engineering and Management Systems (IEMS) Department, and the Mechanical, Materials and Aerospace Engineering (MMAE) Department. The ROTC Division consists of the Aerospace Studies Department (Air Force ROTC) and the Military Science Department (Army ROTC).

=== Electrical Engineering and Computer Science ===
The School of Electrical Engineering and Computer Science was founded under the leadership of Professor Erol Gelenbe in 1999, who was appointed director of the School of Computer Science in 1998, by the merger of the School of Computer Science with the departments of Electrical Engineering and Computer Engineering, and the creation of the Information Technology Program. In 2005, Computer Science and ECE programs were merged curriculum-wise, as a unified School of EECS. In the summer of 2010, the School of EECS was renamed to the Department of EECS.

The Electrical Engineering and Computer Science Departments were then separated. They have had many major accomplishments both in common, and separately, in their history. The Computer Science Programming Team participates in the Association of Computer Machinery's International Collegiate Programming Contest (ACM-ICPC), placing 1st in the fall 2016 and 2017 Southeast ACM Regional Programming Contests. Since 1982, the college has placed in the top three of the five-state region. The team finished 13th in the spring 2017 World Finals (top U.S. team and 2nd in North America). The team improved their ranking in the Spring 2018 World Finals, held in Beijing, China. The team placed 10th overall out of 140 teams, earning a Bronze Medal and North America Champion title. The Programming Team has qualified for and attended 29 finals since 1983, placing as high as 2nd in the competition.

The Computer Science department is also home to the UCF Collegiate Cyber Defense Competition Team. Although the National Collegiate Cyber Defense Competition was established in 2005, it was not until January 2013 that UCF entered a team in this competition. In their inaugural season, the UCF CCDC Team finished in 1st place in the Southeastern Collegiate Cyber Defense Competition, and placed 10th at the National Collegiate Cyber Defense Competition. In 2014, the UCF CCDC Team won the Southeast Collegiate Cyber Defense Competition and placed 1st at the National Collegiate Cyber Defense Competition to become the reigning National Champions of Cyber Defense. In 2015, UCF finished in 1st place at the Southeast Collegiate Cyber Defense Competition, claiming the National Championship at the National Collegiate Cyber Defense competition for the second consecutive year.

=== Rankings ===
- The Electrical Engineering graduate program is ranked 57th nationally in the 2010 U.S. News & World Report America's Best Graduate Schools.
- Computer Science was ranked in the top 100 departments worldwide in 2010 by the Academic Ranking of World Universities.
- The CS Doctoral Program was ranked in the top 20 programs by NAGPS in 2001.

== Research ==
Metropolitan Orlando sustains the world's largest recognized cluster of modeling, simulation and training companies. Located directly south of the main campus is the Central Florida Research Park, which is one of the largest research parks in the nation. Providing more than 10,000 jobs, the Research Park is the largest research park in Florida, the fourth largest in the U.S. by number of companies, and the seventh largest in the U.S. by number of employees. Collectively, UCF's research centers and the park manage over $5.5 billion in contracts annually.

The university fosters partnerships with corporations such as Lockheed Martin, Boeing, and Siemens, and with local community colleges. UCF also houses a satellite campus at the Kennedy Space Center in Cape Canaveral, Florida. UCF is also a member of the Florida High Tech Corridor Council.
