= University of Central Florida College of Health Professions and Sciences =

Coordinates: 28°36′11″N 81°11′55″W

College of Health Professions and Sciences
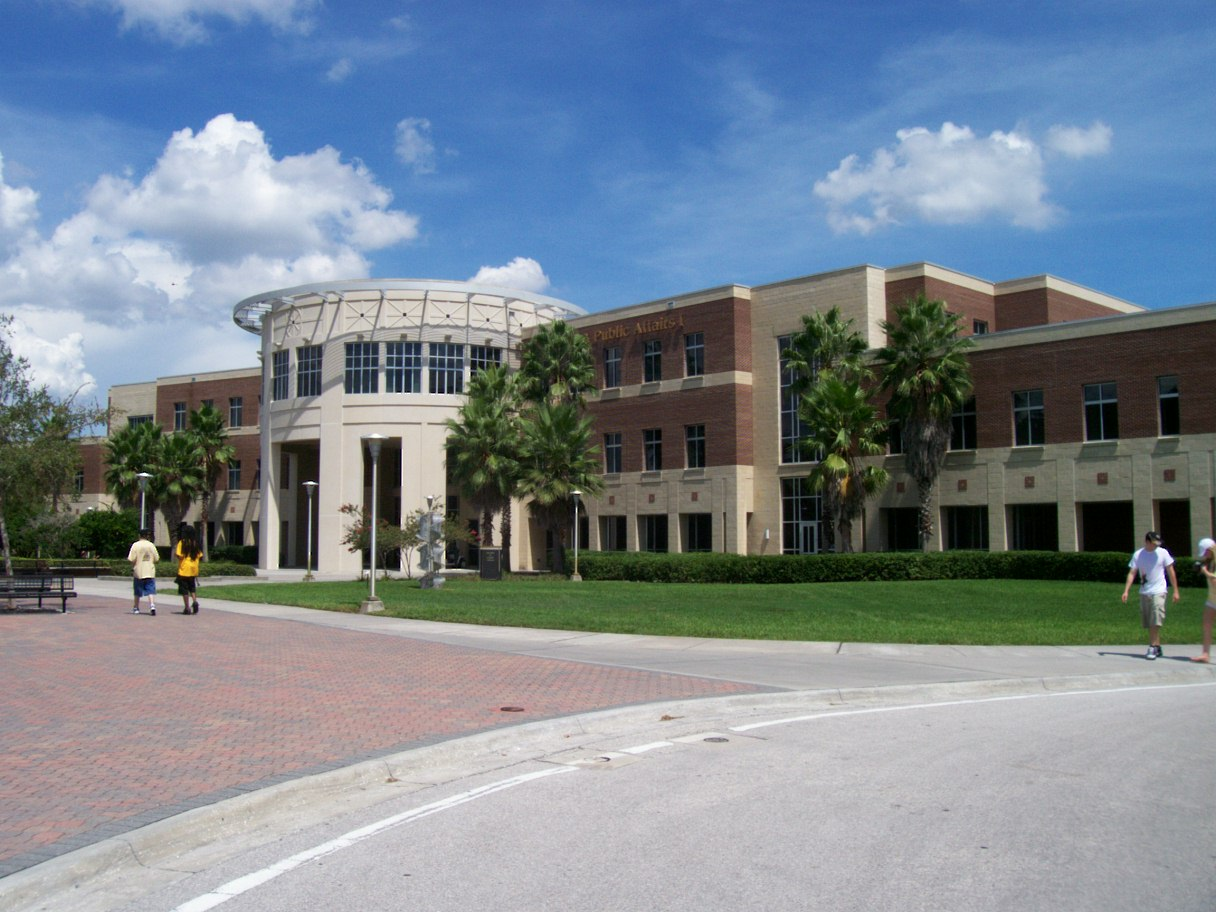
- Established: 1978; 48 years ago as Health and Public Affairs. 2018; 8 years ago as Health Professions and Sciences
- Location: Orlando, Florida, United States

The University of Central Florida College of Health Professions and Sciences was formed in 2018. Formerly, many of the college's programs were housed in the former College of Health and Public Affairs of the University of Central Florida located in Orlando, Florida, United States. The current dean of the college is Christopher Ingersoll. The college of Health and Public Affairs ceased to exist in 2018; its programs were restructured in the current College of Health Professions and Sciences, and by the College of Community Innovation and Education.

The college offers 23 degree options, including 2 doctoral degree programs, and 6 certificate options.

== Organization ==
The College of Health Professions and Sciences includes four departments and schools: ref:https://healthprofessions.ucf.edu/departments/

- School of Communication Sciences and Disorders
- School of Social Work
- School of Kinesiology and Physical Therapy
- Department of Health Sciences

== Degrees, Minors & Certificates ==
The College of Health Professions and Sciences currently offers undergraduate and graduate programs at UCF’s Orlando campus. Several programs are available online as well. From the molecular level to the community level, there’s a program of study for you.

Bachelor's Degrees:

- Communication Sciences and Disorders B.A.
- Communication Sciences and Disorders B.S.
- Health Sciences B.S. - Health Promotion Track
- Health Sciences B.S. - Pre-Clinical Track
- Kinesiology B.S. - Exercise and Sport Physiology Track
- Kinesiology B.S. - Sport and Athletic Coaching Track
- Social Work BSW

Master's Degrees:

- Athletic Training MAT (New in summer 2019)
- Communication Sciences and Disorders M.A.
- Social Work MSW (Online options available)
- Kinesiology M.S.

Doctoral Degrees:

- Exercise Physiology Track, Education Ph.D.
- Physical Therapy DPT
- Social Work Track, Public Affairs Ph.D.

Minors:

- Aging Studies (Available completely online)
- Communication Sciences and Disorders
- Fitness Training
- Health Sciences
- Sport and Athletic Coaching

Undergraduate Certificates

- Aging Studies (Available completely online)
- Children's Services
- Language Development and Disorders

Graduate Certificates

- Anatomical Sciences
- Military Social Work
