= University of Central Florida College of Business Administration =

Business school of University of Central Florida

Coordinates: 28°36′03″N 81°11′58″W

Barry S. Miller College of Business
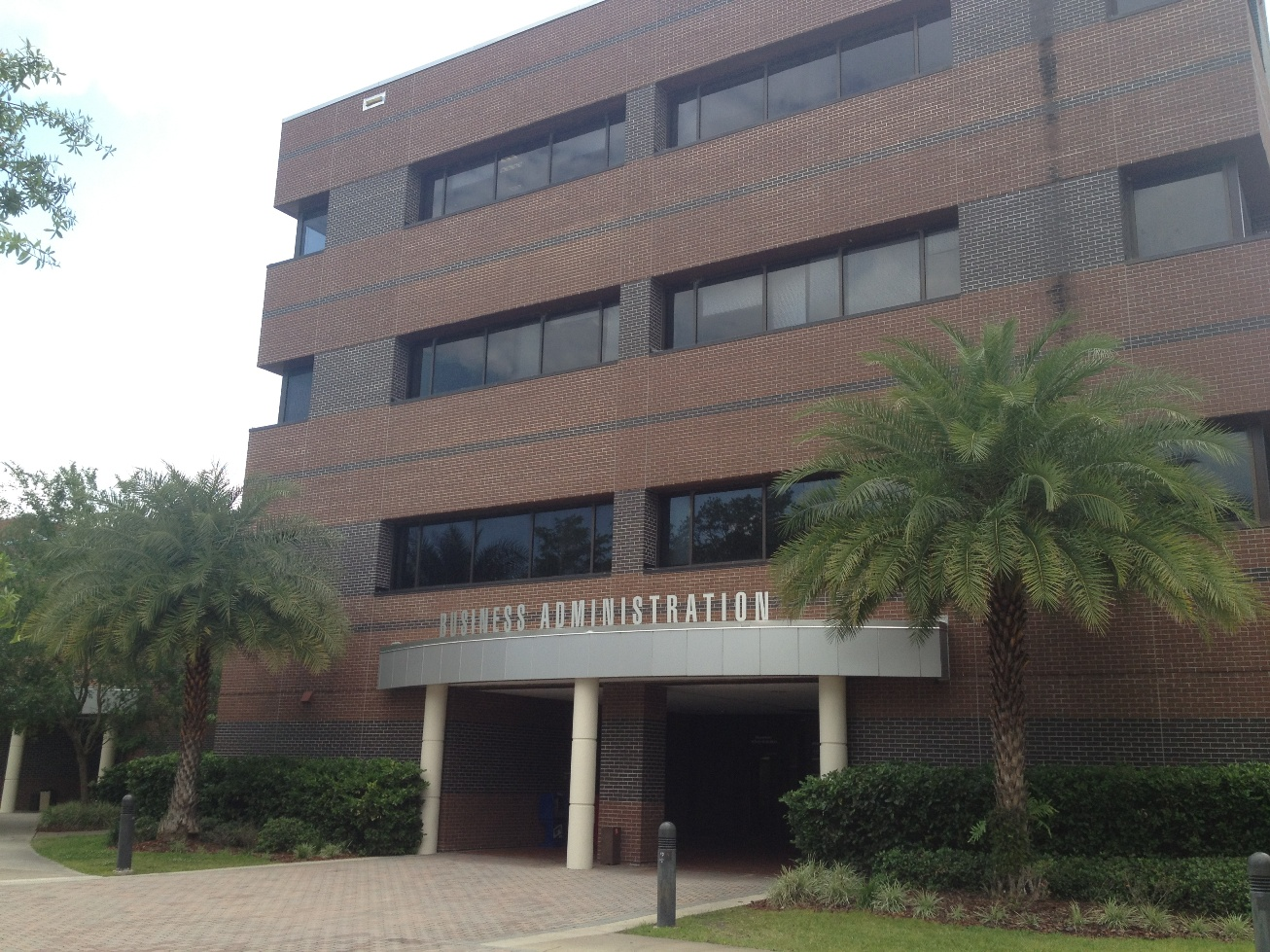
- Type: Public
- Established: 1968; 58 years ago
- Dean: Paul Jarley, Ph.D.
- Undergraduates: 7,880
- Postgraduates: 859
- Location: Orlando, Florida, United States
- Website: Official Site

The University of Central Florida Barry S. Miller College of Business is an academic college of the University of Central Florida located in Orlando, Florida, United States. The dean of the college is Paul Jarley, Ph.D.

The Barry S. Miller College of Business offers programs in accounting, economics, finance, business administration, management, marketing, real estate and taxation, which were developed in response to the demands of the Central Florida community. The curriculum focuses on specific competencies that are integrated throughout all coursework: Teamwork, Communication, Creativity, Adaptation to Change, Diversity, and Ethics.

== History and academics ==
Established in 1968, the college offers degrees at the bachelor’s, master’s, doctoral, and executive levels. All programs, as well as the Kenneth G. Dixon School of Accounting are accredited by the Association to Advance Collegiate Schools of Business. The Master of Science in Real Estate program is the newest program in the school.

The college was named one of the best undergraduate business programs by Bloomberg Businessweek, and in 2007 was ranked among the best 282 business schools by The Princeton Review. The Wall Street Journal ranks the DeVos Sport Business Management program among the top five in the nation. In the 2010 Best 301 Business Schools compilation, the Princeton Review ranked the UCF College of Business Administration's MBA program among the nation’s top 10 "best administered" programs. Also in 2010, Bloomberg Businessweek ranked the UCF College of Business Administration as the number one public business school for return on investment in the nation., and the college was named "Readers' Choice" for best business school in Central Florida to receive an MBA by Orlando Business Journal readers. On April 15, 2026, the college was named the Barry S. Miller College of Business following a $50 million gift, the largest gift in UCF history

== Organization ==
The college is composed of seven academic departments:

- Kenneth G. Dixon School of Accounting
- Economics Department
- Finance Department
- Management Department
- Department of Marketing
- Dr. P. Phillips School of Real Estate
- DeVos Sport Business Management Department (graduate-only)
