= University of Central Florida Board of Trustees =

Governing body of the University of Central Florida

- Formation: 2001; 25 years ago
- Type: Governing Board
- Headquarters: Orlando, Florida
- Location: United States
- Members: 13
- Chair: Alex Martins
- Key people: Vice Chair, Harold Mills
- Website: bot.ucf.edu

The University of Central Florida Board of Trustees is the governing body of the University of Central Florida, a space-grant university located on a 1,415-acre (5.73 km^{2}) main campus in Orlando, Florida, United States. UCF is a member institution of the State University System of Florida and is the largest public university in the United States.

The board of trustees is the governing body of UCF, setting policy for the university, and serving as UCF's legal owner and final authority. Overall, the Board of Trustees hold the institution's resources in trust, is responsible for selection of the university president and administrators, and are responsible for university resources and for implementing the rules and policies of the Florida Board of Governors.

== History ==
The University of Central Florida Board of Trustees was founded in 2001, after the Florida Board of Regents – the governing body of the state university system – was abolished by an act of the Florida state legislature. The Board of Regents was responsible "for adopting systemwide rules and policies; planning for the future needs of the State University System; planning the programmatic, financial and physical development of the system; reviewing and evaluating the instructional, research, and service programs at the universities; coordinating program development among the universities; and monitoring the fiscal performance of the universities." After the dissolution of the Board of Regents, the powers held by the Regents were then awarded to independent, appointed university Boards of Trustees.

Governor Jeb Bush appointed the first twelve charter trustees, who took office on June 22, 2001. In an effort led by United States Senator Bob Graham, the Florida Constitution was amended in 2003 to create a new statewide governing body for the State University System of Florida. The Amendment created the Florida Board of Governors, which oversees the state university system, and has veto and confirmation powers over the board of trustees.

== Composition ==
The board consists of thirteen members, six members that are appointed by the governor of Florida and five members that are selected by the Florida Board of Governors. The chair of the Faculty Senate and the president of the student government also serve as trustees during their terms. Trustees serve staggered 5-year terms. The current chair of the board is Beverly Seay and the vice chair is Harold Mills.

| Trustee | Position |
|---|---|
| Alex Martins | Chair, |
| Harold Mills | Board Vice Chair and member, |
| Tiffany A. Altizer | Member, certified public accountant and managing shareholder of Keith Altizer and Company, P.A. |
| Bill Christy | Member, CEO of Cognitive Kinetics |
| Jeff Condello | Member, President and CEO of Randall |
| Joseph Conte | Member, co-founder of Consulate Health Care |
| Danny Gaekwad | Member, |
| Meg Hall | Member, Student Body President |
| Joseph Harrington | Member, Faculty Senate Chair, faculty member in the Department of Physics |
| Beverly Seay | Member, chairs of the Deans’ Industry Advisory Boards at the UCF College of Engineering and Computer Science and the Georgia Tech College of Computing |
| Caryl McAlpin | Member, |
| John Miklos | Member, |
| Michael Okaty | Member, |

== See also ==
- Education in Florida
- Florida Board of Governors
- State University System of Florida
- University of Central Florida Student Government
