= Robert A. Bryan =

American journalist

- Born: Robert Armistead Bryan; April 26, 1926; Lebanon, Pennsylvania, U.S.
- Died: December 27, 2017 (aged 91); Gainesville, Florida, U.S.
- Education: University of Miami (B.A.); University of Kentucky (M.A. and Ph.D.)
- Occupations: university professor university administrator
- Employer(s): U.S. Merchant Marine; U.S. Army; University of Florida; University of Central Florida; University of South Florida
- Spouse(s): Kathryn Elizabeth Williams Bryan (deceased 2007)

Robert Armistead Bryan (April 26, 1926 – December 27, 2017) was an American former university professor, administrator, and university president. He was as a professor of English literature and later a long-time professor and academic administrator at the University of Florida, and was appointed as the university's interim president, serving from 1989 to 1990. Bryan also served as the interim president of the University of Central Florida from 1991 to 1992, and interim president of the University of South Florida from 1993 to 1994.

== Early life and education ==
Bryan was born in Lebanon, Pennsylvania, on April 26, 1926. He graduated with a Bachelor of Arts degree in English from the University of Miami and a Master of Arts and Doctor of Philosophy in English from the University of Kentucky.

== Career ==
He was an English professor who specialized in 16th and 17th century English literature. He taught at the University of Florida in Gainesville, Florida, beginning in 1957, with short-term teaching assignments at Florida Southern College in Lakeland and Florida Atlantic University in Boca Raton. In each instance, Bryan returned to the faculty of the University of Florida.

Before accepting the professorship at Florida in 1957, Bryan served as a ship's officer in the U.S. Merchant Marine, as a special agent in U.S. Army counterintelligence, and as a lecturer in English literature at the University of California's Extension Division in Tokyo and at the University of Kentucky.

Bryan began his administrative career by becoming the assistant to the dean of the University of Florida's Graduate School in 1961. A year later, as an associate professor, he became director of Florida's Ford Foundation.

=== Florida Atlantic University ===
In 1969, he was appointed dean of advanced studies and director of research at Florida Atlantic University. In 1970, he returned to the University of Florida, and was appointed dean of faculties. He was promoted to associate vice president for academic affairs in 1971, and became the vice-president of academic affairs in 1975. In 1985, he also became university provost, serving in that capacity until his appointment as interim president.

=== University of Florida ===
Following the retirement of University of Florida president Marshall Criser in 1989, Bryan served as the acting president of the University of Florida from 1989 to 1990. As a long-time vice president of the university administration, he immediately placed his own stamp on it.

During his twelve months as the university's interim president, Bryan became enmeshed in high profile controversies involving NCAA violations by two of the university's athletic coaches. He was responsible for the forced resignation of Florida Gators football coach Galen Hall in September 1989, following alleged NCAA rules infractions by Hall and the football staff, and, together with athletic director Bill Arnsparger, for hiring Heisman Trophy-winning University of Florida alumnus Steve Spurrier as the new head coach of the Gators football team in December 1989.

Only weeks after Bryan was responsible for Hall's forced resignation, he demanded the resignation of Gators basketball head coach Norm Sloan for unrelated NCAA violations; Sloan was replaced by interim coach Don DeVoe. The Florida Board of Regents publicly credited Bryan with making difficult, but decisive decisions to preserve the integrity of the university.

=== University of Central Florida ===
Bryan was recalled from retirement in 1991, when the Board of Regents asked him to serve as the interim president of the University of Central Florida in Orlando. He was credited with creating the new UCF satellite campus in downtown Orlando, Florida.

=== University of South Florida ===
Having developed a reputation as a capable university administrator, he was asked to serve as the interim president of the University of South Florida in Tampa from 1993 to 1994, the third time he served as interim president of a major state university.

During his term as interim president of the University of South Florida, Bryan required significantly greater financial commitments from the athletic department, boosters, and alumni before the university's new South Florida Bulls football program began intercollegiate play.

In addition to his work as a professor and university administrator, Bryan also served as the president of the Florida Association of Colleges and as a consultant for the Southern Association of Colleges and Schools. He authored several books, academic journal articles, and reviews.

== Personal life ==
Bryan was married to the former Kathryn Elizabeth Williams; they had two children, Lyla Bryan King and Matthew Bryan. His wife died in 2007. Bryan lived in Gainesville, Florida.

== Death ==
Bryan died on December 27, 2017, at the age of 91.

== Bibliography ==
- Greenberg, Mark I., University of South Florida: The First Fifty Years, 1956-2006, University of South Florida, Tampa, Florida (2006).
- Pleasants, Julian M., Gator Tales: An Oral History of the University of Florida, University of Florida, Gainesville, Florida (2006). ISBN 0-8130-3054-4.
- Van Ness, Carl, & Kevin McCarthy, Honoring the Past, Shaping the Future: The University of Florida, 1853–2003, University of Florida, Gainesville, Florida (2003).
