= Knights Plaza =

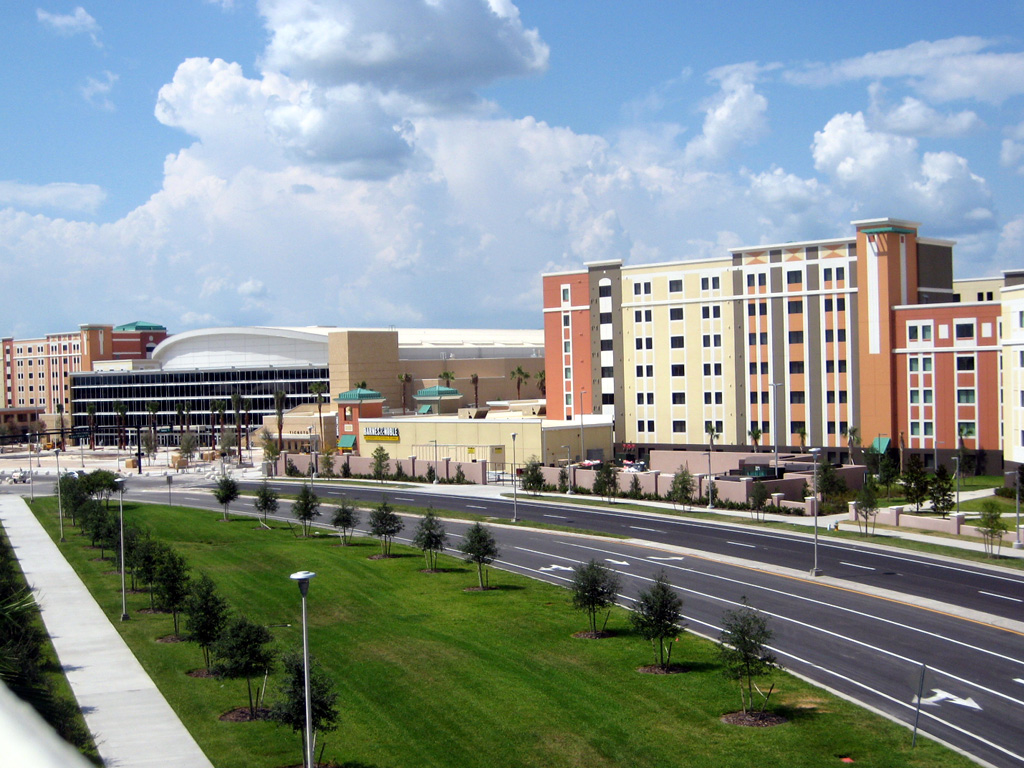
- Knights Plaza as viewed from the southeast
- Location: Orlando, Florida, United States
- Coordinates: 28°36′24″N 81°11′52″W
- Address: North Gemini Blvd
- Opened: September 15, 2007
- Manager: University of Central Florida
- Owner: University of Central Florida
- Num. of stores: 22
- Num. of anchor tenants: 1
- Floor area: 183,000 square feet (17,000 m^{2})
- Floors: 1 (retail), 7 (residential)
- Parking: 3 parking garages, on-street parallel parking
- Website: knightsplaza.com

Knights Plaza at University of Central Florida, commonly referred to as Knights Plaza, is an athletic village and shopping center on the main campus of the University of Central Florida in Orlando, Florida, United States. The plaza consists of housing for more than 2,000 students in four towers, 183,000 square feet (17,000 m^{2}) of commercial space, the 10,000-seat Addition Financial Arena, and the 2,300-seat Venue at UCF Arena. The design of the plaza and its mixed use appeal to students, faculty, and surrounding residents, making it a popular community destination.

== Facilities ==
=== Athletics ===
Knights Plaza contains many venues to accommodate events of all sizes and forms:

- Acrisure Bounce House – 45,300-seat stadium
- Addition Financial Arena – 10,000-seat arena
- The Venue – 2,300-seat arena
- Jay Bergman Field – 3,600-seat stadium
- UCF Soccer and Track Stadium – 2,000-seat stadium
- Cypress Room Event Center
- IOA Plaza

=== Student housing ===
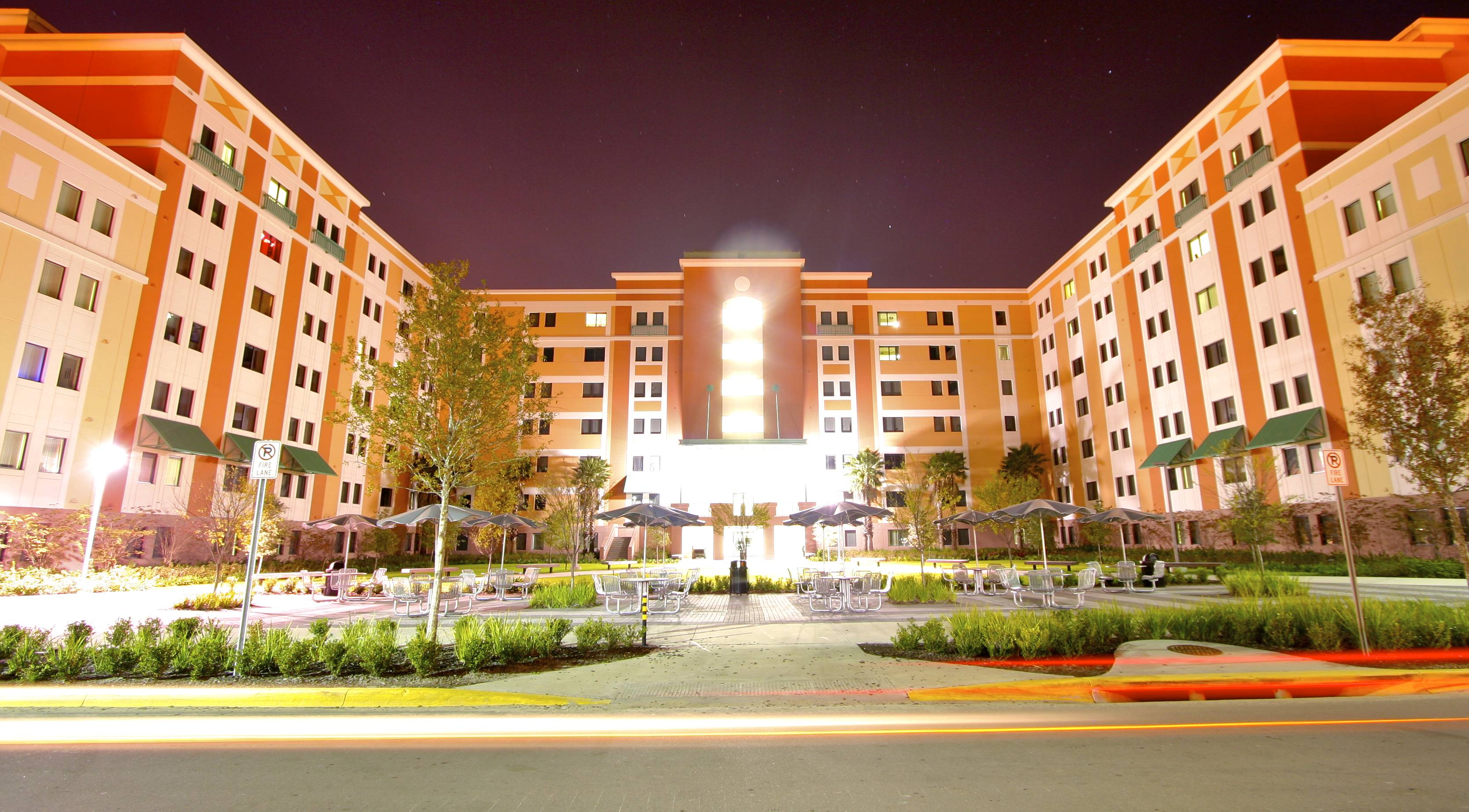
Tower I as viewed from its promenade

The Towers at Knights Plaza (Tower I, II, III, and IV) houses 2,000 students, 500 in each tower. Residents of the Towers Community sign annual contracts to rent their apartments for a full academic year (fall, spring, and summer), whereas residents of all other standard housing communities on the main campus sign academic contracts to rent their rooms only for one or two semesters at a time. The Towers house the majority of the upper-classmen who live on campus.

Residents of the Towers are provided a secure mail room, and entrance to the buildings and apartments are controlled via the students university identification badge. Apartments in the Towers are offered in various plans ranging from 1 bedroom/1 bathroom to 4 bedroom/4 bathroom, with the majority being 4 bedroom/2 bathroom. Tower III is a learning community for students enrolled in the Burnett Honors College. Most UCF athletes are housed in Tower IV.

=== Commercial ===
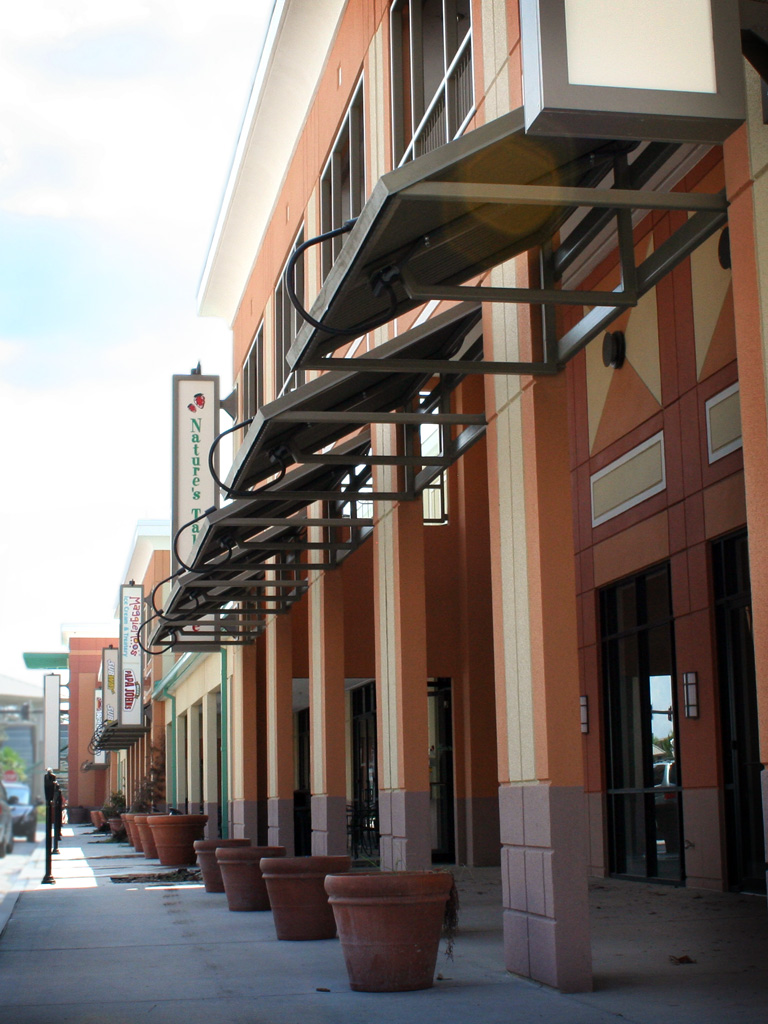

Knights Plaza contains 183,000 square feet (17,000 m^{2}) of retail and restaurant space. The retail stores are located on the streets on both sides of the arena, which lead back to the other stadiums. Additionally, the lobby of the CFE Arena contains a food court as well as interior access to some of the other retail spaces.

- 7-Eleven
- Amazon Campus Pickup Point
- Barnes & Noble
- Burger U
- CFE Federal Credit Union
- Domino's Pizza
- Dunkin' Donuts
- Jimmy John's
- All Knight Study
- Knight Aide Pharmacy and Convenience Store
- Knightro's restaurant
- Gringos Locos
- Recreation and Wellness Center at Knights Plaza
- Subway
- The Pop Parlour
- The Princeton Review
- Towers Mail Center
- UCF Card Services
- Veteran's Academic Resource Center

== Events ==
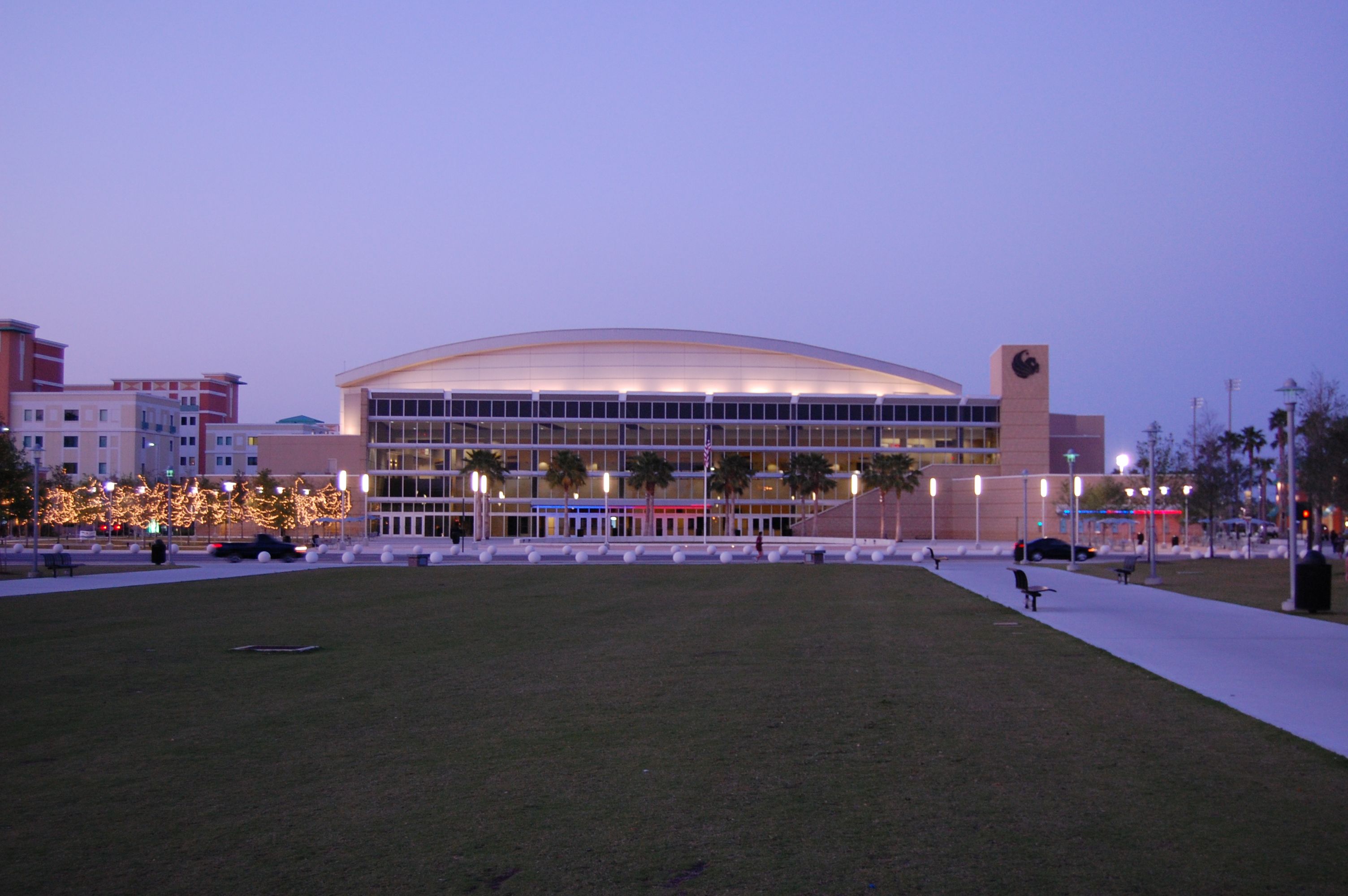
Addition Financial Arena

Knights Plaza hosts hundreds of events throughout the year, ranging from football games that take over the entire UCF campus to block parties and bingo nights.

=== Athletics ===
Knights Plaza is home to the UCF Knights athletic programs and was designed as an athletic village. The football team plays in Bright House Networks Stadium, the men's and women's basketball teams in the CFE Arena, and the volleyball team plays in the Venue. The plaza also contains Jay Bergman Field, a 2000-seat baseball stadium for the men's baseball team, and the 2,000 seat UCF Soccer and Track Stadium.

Knights Plaza and the adjacent Memory Mall are the prime tailgating location during home football games.

=== Special events ===
Movies on the Plaza

The CFE Arena has hosted many performances, such as comedians: Dave Chappelle, Carlos Mencia, Bob Saget and Bill Cosby; concerts by Paul Simon, Elton John, Reba McEntire, Nine Inch Nails; and other events such as the Harlem Globetrotters, Sesame Street Live, monster truck shows, rodeos, the circus, and a speech by former President Bill Clinton.

Throughout the year, Knights Plaza plays movies on a two-story outdoor movie screen in the middle of the plaza for students as well as the surrounding community residents to enjoy. Many people set up a picnic, and Knights Plaza food vendors provide at seat food delivery. Prior to the start of the movie, contests, block parties, and other events take place throughout the plaza. Couches and seats are also provided by Knights Plaza.

A farmers market is occasionally held in the open plaza area of Knights Plaza. Over eighty different vendors, sell fresh produce, jewellery, artwork, and other locally made items to students and local area residents.

=== Light Up UCF ===
During the holiday season (November–January), Knights Plaza constructs an outdoor ice rink in front of the arena and hosts events nightly to celebrate the holiday season. During Light Up UCF, a high tech light show consisting of over 75,000 lights dances around the plaza to holiday music, and live concerts are performed by bands such as the Marching Knights and local artists. During the 2008 inaugural year, it attracted over 150,000 attendees. The 2009 season included a 20% larger ice rink with the Arctic Guide Ice Slide, the McDonald's Ferris Wheel, Kris Kringle's Carousel, Santa's Village and many more lights to provide more entertainment for attendees.

== Future ==
Knights Plaza has had difficulties filling its remaining retail space due to the current economic circumstances. Many have blamed the lack of free parking, leading the university to suspend parking charges in one the plaza's parking garages on non-event days. Nature's Table Cafe and Mau's Hair and Nails went out of business shortly after opening, and several other retailers never opened their doors, resulting in many unoccupied storefronts throughout the plaza. In order to combat this problem and increase retailer confidence, events are held frequently in the plaza and its venues; due to this, however, the students forced to deal with the additional traffic in order to reach the only study facility on-campus, "All Knight Study", which is located in the plaza also. The remaining retail spaces are slowly filling in with additional retailers.

Knights Plaza was initially developed with plans to add additional retail space in two more phases over the coming years. However, due to the difficulties in leasing the original phase, the plans have been delayed and revised. Several of the athletic venues will be expanded and renovated to handle larger crowds, including the completed expansion of the UCF Soccer and Track Stadium to 2,000 seats in 2011, and the planned renovations in 2013 to Jay Bergman Field to add an additional 1,000 seats and new luxury suites. Other future, yet unplanned, expansions are scheduled to include the expansion of Acrisure Bounce House to 65,000 seats.
