= Burnett Honors College =

College of the University of Central Florida in Orlando

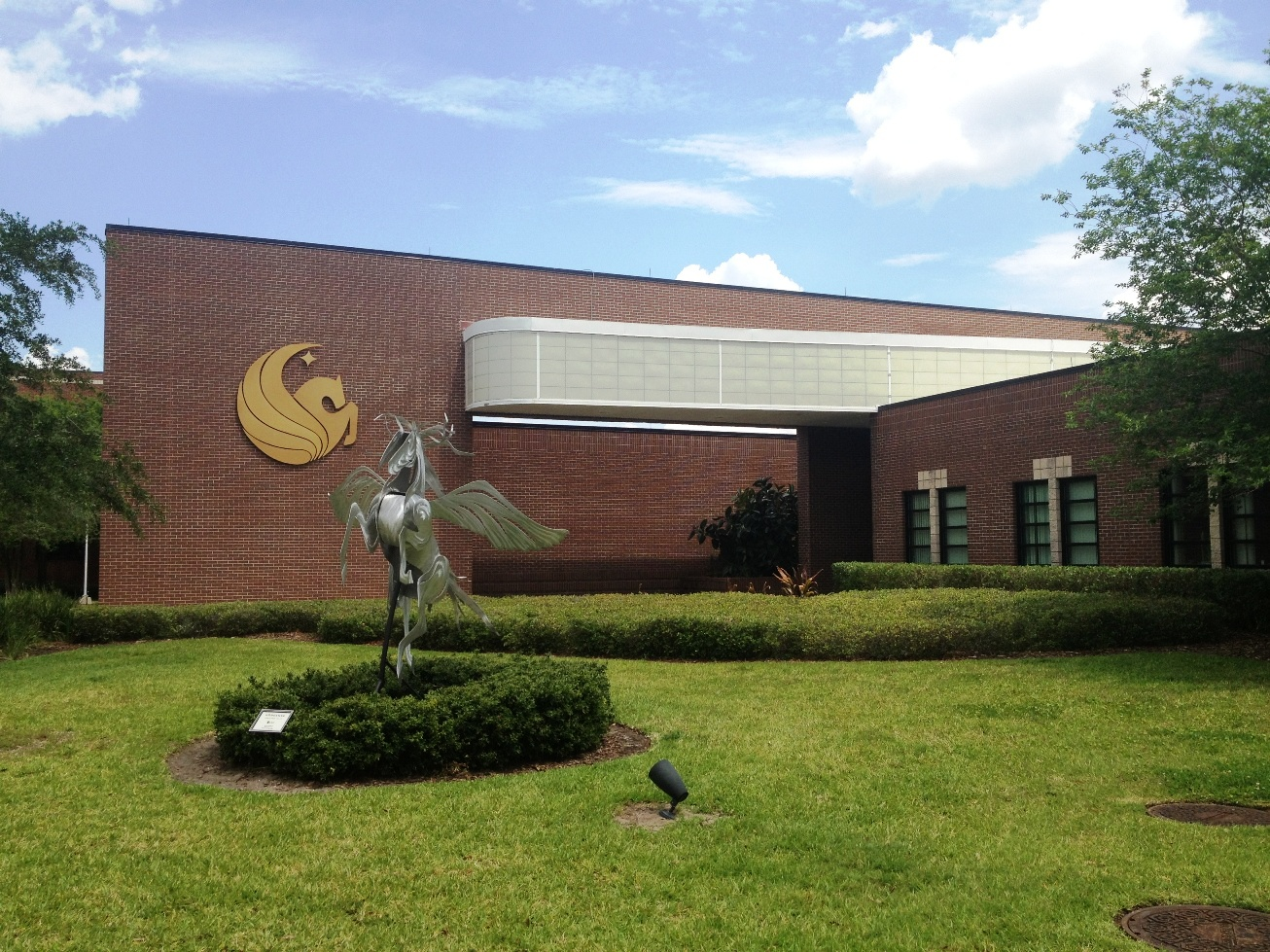
- Type: Public
- Established: 1998; 28 years ago
- Dean: Sheila Amin Gutiérrez de Piñeres, Ph.D.
- Students: 1,700
- Location: Orlando, Florida, United States; 28°36′08″N 81°12′08″W
- Website: Official Site

Burnett Honors College is an academic college of the University of Central Florida located in Orlando, Florida, United States. Founded in 1998 as the University Honors Program, it was expanded and renamed in 2002 in response to a $1.5 million gift by Al and Nancy Burnett. The current dean of the college is Sheila Amin Gutiérrez de Piñeres, Ph.D.

The college administers UCF's two honors programs, University Honors and Honors Undergraduate Thesis (HUT), through programs of advanced study at the university's main campus in Orlando. These programs encompass students who are also in one of UCF's twelve other academic colleges but have applied to and been accepted to the Burnett Honors College. The college offers an honors dormitory in the Towers at Knights Plaza, and honors students are assisted with applying for post-graduate honors and fellowships.

== History ==
In 1998, the UCF Honors Program was granted college status. Al and Nancy Burnett donated $1.5 million towards the completion of a building to house the new honors college, and it was subsequently named in their honor. A state grant matched the donation made by the Burnett's, bringing total funding for the new college to $3 million. Ground was broken on the new facility on April 24, 2001, and the Burnett Honors College building was completed in May 2002, and formally dedicated on October 23, 2002.

In 2007 the college partnered with the Department of Housing and Residence Life to create a living-learning community, composed mostly of honors students, in Tower III at Knights Plaza.

== Admission ==
Admission to the Burnett Honors College is limited to incoming freshmen, rising sophomores through the Second Year Entry program, and transfer students from specific public colleges for the University Honors program, and juniors and seniors for the Honors Undergraduate Thesis program. Requirements for freshman entrance include excellent high school grades, one personal statement, strong extracurricular activities, and references. Requirements for the Second Year Entry program include strong freshman year performance, one personal statement, references, a plan of study, and strong extracurriculars. The Honors Undergraduate Thesis (HUT) program requires a minimum of 60 completed credit hours, 12 completed upper-division credit hours, a 3.4 GPA, and two or more semesters remaining prior to graduation. Some departments or colleges have additional requirements as well.

A recent Burnett Honors College incoming class had an average SAT score of 1457, an average ACT score of 32.1 and average high school GPAs of 4.46 (weighted). The class boasted 27 National Merit Scholars, 115 AP Scholars and eight National Hispanic Scholars.

== Academics ==
The college does not have any departments or offer any degrees by itself; all of its students are also students of one of the other colleges at the university. Burnett students are able to take smaller honors-versions of both lower-division and upper-division university courses (most of which are limited to a 20-student capacity), priority multiple-term class registration, usage of a private BHC Computer Lab, Reading Room, extended library privileges, scholarship opportunities, among others.

=== Programs ===
The Burnett Honors College offers two distinct Honors programs for students: University Honors, which is a 4-year program, and Honors Undergraduate Thesis, which allows juniors and seniors to conduct original research within their major (Honors in the Major) or in their minor or a discipline other than their major (Interdisciplinary Thesis) and write an undergraduate honors thesis.

The two programs are not mutually exclusive, and in fact share many common elements. If a student completes one of these programs, an Honors distinction corresponding to the program that was completed will appear on the student's diploma and official transcript. The college also offers many events and programs, which are open to UCF students regardless of whether or not they are honors students. In addition, the honors college houses the Office of Prestigious Awards, which provides information and preparation services for all UCF students interested in applying for prestigious scholarships and fellowships.
