= Marching Knights =

Marching band of the University of Central Florida

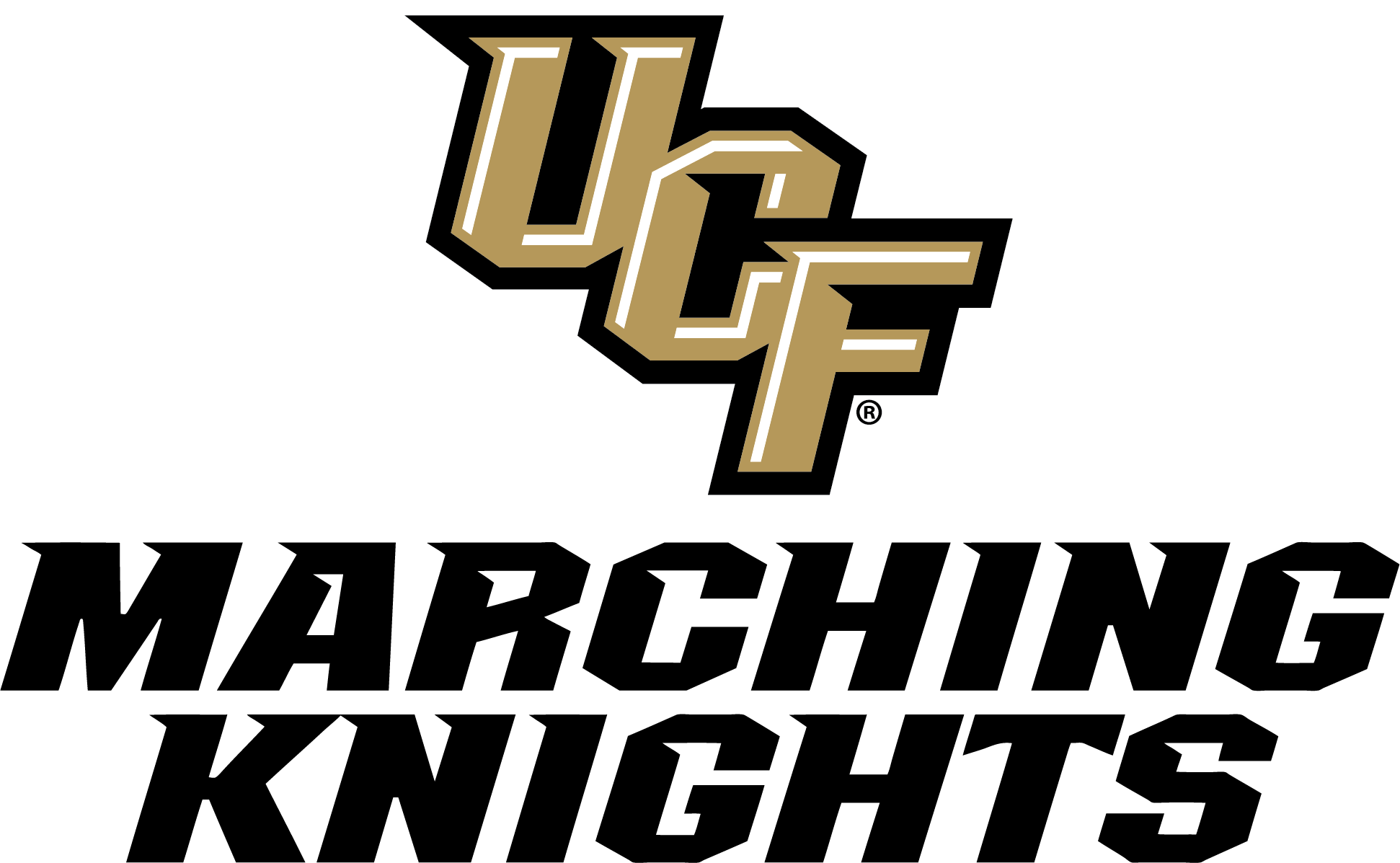
- School: University of Central Florida
- Location: Orlando, Florida, United States
- Conference: Big 12
- Founded: 1980; 46 years ago
- Director: Dr. Tremon Kizer
- Assistant Director: Mr. Dave Schreier
- Members: 416
- Fight song: "Charge On"
- Website: ucfbands.com//

The Marching Knights (also known as The Pride of Central Florida) are the official marching band of The University of Central Florida in Orlando, Florida, USA. The Marching Knights are the largest and the most visible student organization at the University of Central Florida. They are known for their high-energy performances and unique drill designs. Their musical selections are also notable for including a variety of genres.

== History ==
In 1979, the University of Central Florida fielded their first football team, and subsequently created a marching band to support it. On July 1, 1980, Jerry Gardner was hired as the first director of what would become the UCF Marching Knights. With the help of the young Troy Driggers, who would become one of the first drum majors (along with Ken DeBord), Gardner poured through the file of every UCF student looking for those who had marching/band experience and invited them to join. All of their work paid off, as in the first year, the Marching Knights fielded 125 members.

On November 8, 1980, UCF's Homecoming, the Marching Knights performed their first halftime show. The show featured the selections: Triumph of the Titans, Sweet Georgia Brown, Crown Imperial, You are the Sunshine of My Life, and Love will Keep us Together.

In August 1982, the Marching Knights were jolted by the sudden death of Troy Diggers in a car accident. The 1983 season was dedicated to him, with the entire band wearing a pin on their uniform. To this day, the “Driggers’ Pin” is a part of the Marching Knights uniform. In 2014, the pin was changed from a black and gold ribbon to an actual pin, featuring the letters “MK” inside a Pegasus star for “Marching Knights” and is stamped with the letters “TD” for “Troy Driggers” on the back.

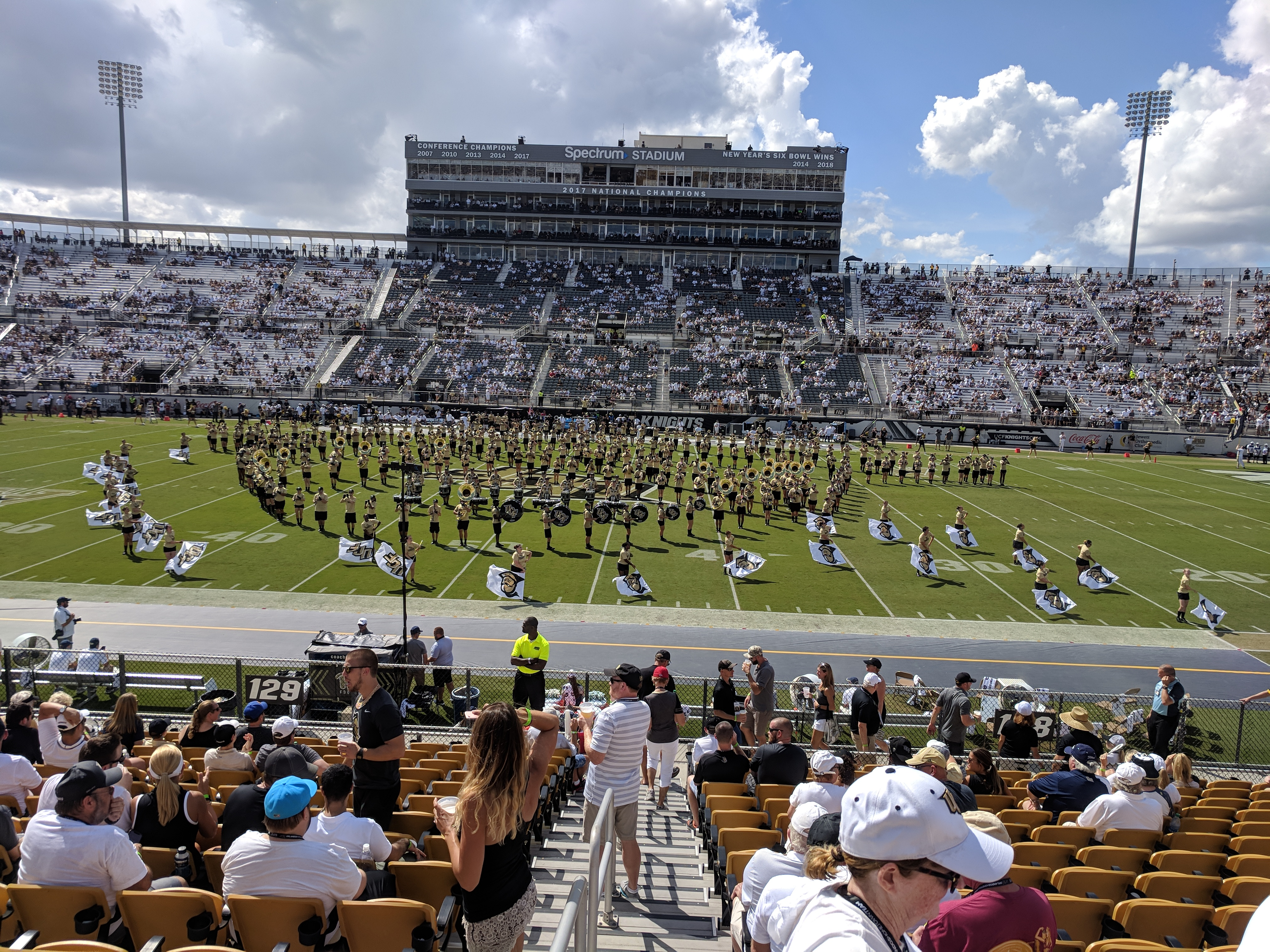
Marching Knights in FBC Mortgage Stadium

From 1991 to 1996, Richard Greenwood and Ron Ellis formed the Summer Knights. This was an “Ultra-hip, high-energy show band” consisting of 23 members of the Marching Knights that would tour high schools in Florida. This group of students were ambassadors of UCF and the music department.

Also in 1991, the Marching Knights Alumni Band Association was formed. Today, over 150 alumni return every year to perform with the Marching Knights during homecoming.

In 1996, the band was invited to perform for the 25th anniversary of Walt Disney World. After spending all night at the Magic Kingdom, the band performed in the “Remember the Magic” Parade.

The Marching Knights would travel internationally for the first time in 2003. The band, under the direction of Richard Greenwood and Ron Ellis, travelled to Sweden for the Eksjö International Tattoo Marching Band Festival, performing several times throughout their trip, as well as visiting many sites along the way.

In 2005, the 25th anniversary of the Marching Knights, the directors gathered around 40 members from 1986–2005 to record the first ever CD of the band: “UCF Marching Knights: Celebrating Twenty-Five Years of Music”. The album featured music from pre-game and UCF traditional cheers, like Go Knights Funk, the Chant, and the Fight Song. Three more albums have followed: Charge On (2013: Tobias/Schreier), Sounds of Gold (2015: Cumberledge/Schreier), and Live From Driggers Field (2018: Kizer/Schreier).

In 2007, the Marching Knights made their “Hollywood Debut” by performing in the movie “Sydney White”. They were in two scenes and performed their fight song.

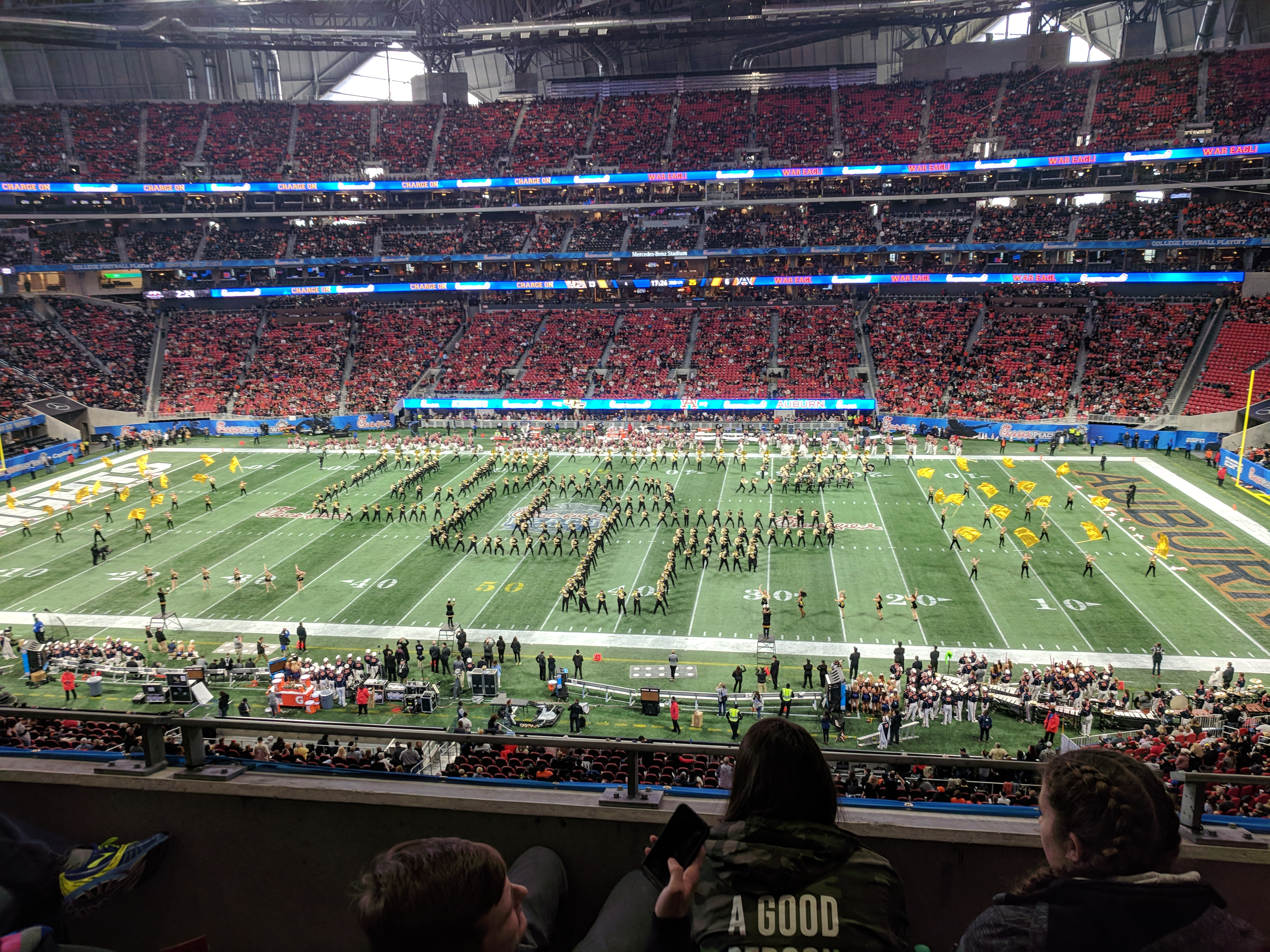
Marching Knights spelling out UCF during the Pregame show

In 2009, at a Marching Knights rehearsal, Ron Ellis and then graduate assistants Dave Schreier and Jason Millhouse had a conversation on the field about naming the fight song. It only took two minutes before “Charge On” was chosen. The title was announced for the first time during pregame performances that year and has since become a staple in UCF vernacular.

The Marching Knights have performed in several bowl games over the years but gained much notoriety after performances at New Years Six Bowl Games: 2014 Tostitos Fiesta Bowl, 2017 Chick-fil-a Peach Bowl, and 2018 PlayStation Fiesta Bowl.

In 2013 and 2014, the Marching Knights were invited to perform as the house band for the ESPN College Football Awards Show, filmed live at Disney's Boardwalk. In 2014, The band returned at the Magic Kingdom for the first time since 1996 to perform for a special parade for the Fiesta Bowl Champions. This performance to the Magic Kingdom allowed the creation of a new partnership between Disney and the Marching Knights. This partnership began with an invitation to perform at an awards presentation for the 10th anniversary of Festival Disney, at the Lights, Motors, Action theatre at Disney's Hollywood Studios in April, 2014. UCF would again be honoured with a special parade following an undefeated football season, capped off with a Peach Bowl win in 2017.

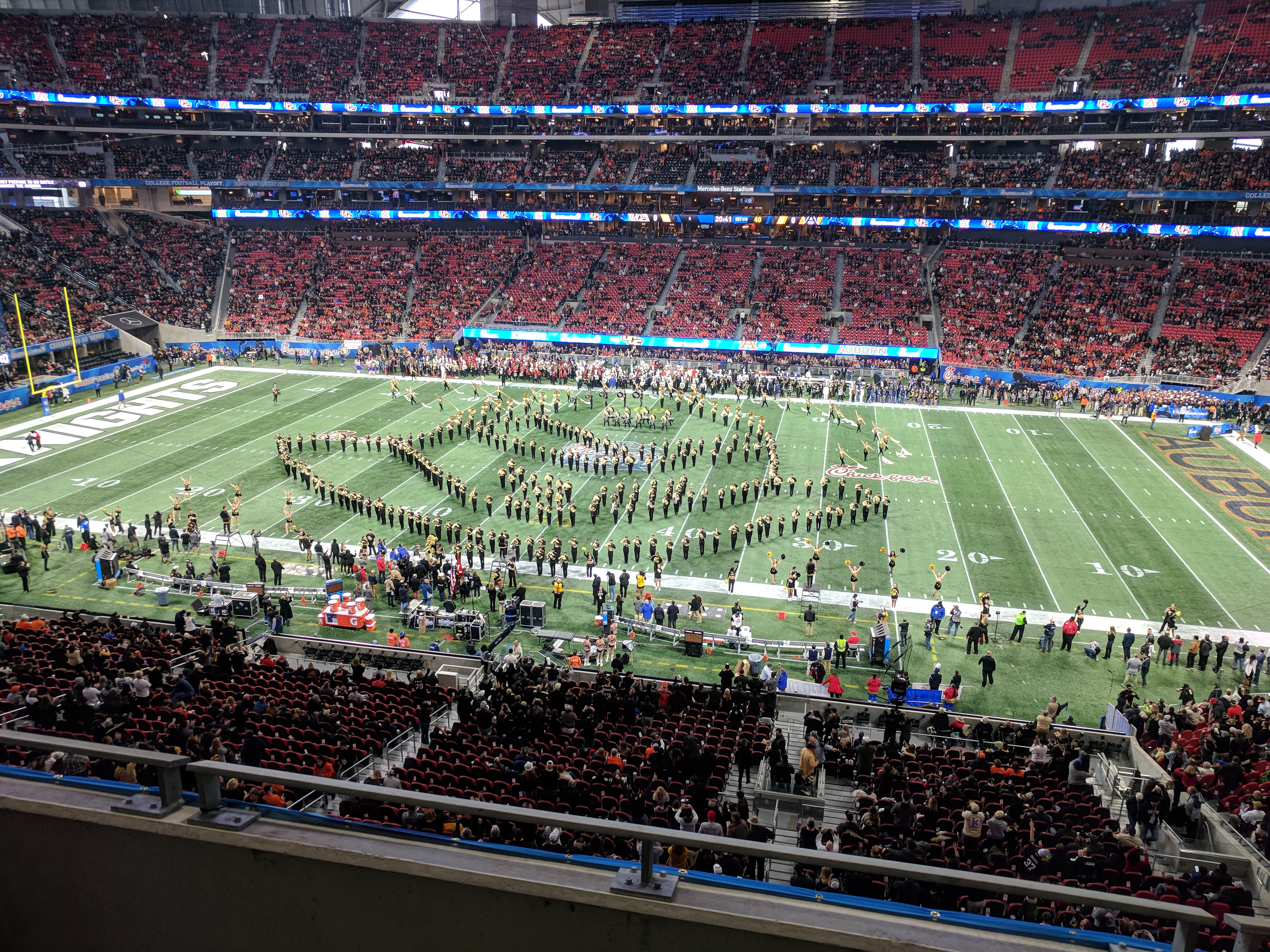
The Marching Knights forming the Knight head during their Pregame Show at the Peach Bowl

In 2017, in addition to an impressive undefeated season, a major bowl game, and a parade at Disney World, the Marching Knights inaugurated their own permanent building, cementing their place on campus.

In 2018, for the first time ever, ESPN College Game Day broadcast live from UCF on Memory Mall, and the Marching Knights were featured prominently throughout the broadcast. Following the Game Day broadcast was UCF's first National ABC Prime-time game, where the #11 Knights beat #24 Cincinnati, with plenty of opportunity for the Marching Knights to receive recognition on TV and Social Media as well.

The Marching Knights have persevered through the 2020 pandemic. With many precautions and mitigations, they were still able to have a season and perform in person. While the band was not allowed to move on the field, the spirit of the Marching Knights was still upheld during the celebration of their 40th Anniversary – including an online round-table featuring former drum majors, directors, Driggers’ award winners and other prominent alumni members.

== Directors ==
In 1985, Mr. Gardner retired from directing the Marching Knights to focus on his health, and in 1986, Roger New-burn became the second Director. Since then, eight additional directors have led the Marching Knights:

Year	Name
1980-1986	Mr. Jerry Gardner
1986-1988	Mr. Roger Newburn
1988-2004	Dr. Richard Greenwood
1996-2010	Mr. Ron Ellis
2010-2013	Dr. Donny Allen
2013-2014	Dr. Scott Tobias
2014-2015	Dr. Ryan Kelly
2015-2016	Dr. Jason Cumberledge
2010–Present	Mr. Dave "Steve" Schreier
2016–Present	Dr. Tremon Kizer

== Traditions ==
"Memory Mall Flagpole Warm-up" - Every home game the UCF Drumline warms up and performs at one of the most popular spots to tailgate on campus, Memory Mall. They often perform is their signature cadence, "Mojo Knights" written by Jeff Moore.

"Circles" - Before the full band warm-up, each section circles up on their own in different spots in front of the Student Union to warm-up as a section. Every section has their own traditions during their warm-ups. For example, the trumpet section will do one of their warm-ups inside the Student Union.

"Union Warm-up" - The Marching Knights perform outside the Student Union right before they go and march to the Stadium. They will play a selection of warm-ups, halftime show music, and stands tunes. It ends with the UCF Fight Song "Charge On".

"March to Victory" - After the Marching Knights march their way through the tailgating at Memory Mall, they stop at Addition Financial Arena where they perform some school tunes for the tailgaters at Memory Mall. Following that performance, along with the UCF Spirit Squad and UCF mascot Knightro, they march to the stadium playing The Chant to hype up fans.

"Pregame" - Twenty minutes before kick-off, the UCF Drum line and a Drum Major will take the field. Following the sword plant, the UCF Drum line will play the "Tunnel Cadence" as the rest of the band, led by the other two drum majors, run onto the field from the tunnels on opposite corners of the field. Once the band is on the field in a massive block formation, they will play the "Pregame Fanfare" to the west and east stands. Following this, the band plays the piece "Carmina Burana" which ends with the band forming the knight head shape and going in the UCF Fight Song "Charge On". The Marching Knights then play the UCF Alma Mater and the National Anthem. After that, the Marching Knights perform a series of different songs and forms including, UCF Spell out, The Chant, and the Knights Spell out. As the team runs out, the band will play the UCF Fight Song "Charge On" and then march off the field.
