= University of Central Florida student housing =

Coordinates: 28.59751°N 81.19843°W

Student Housing
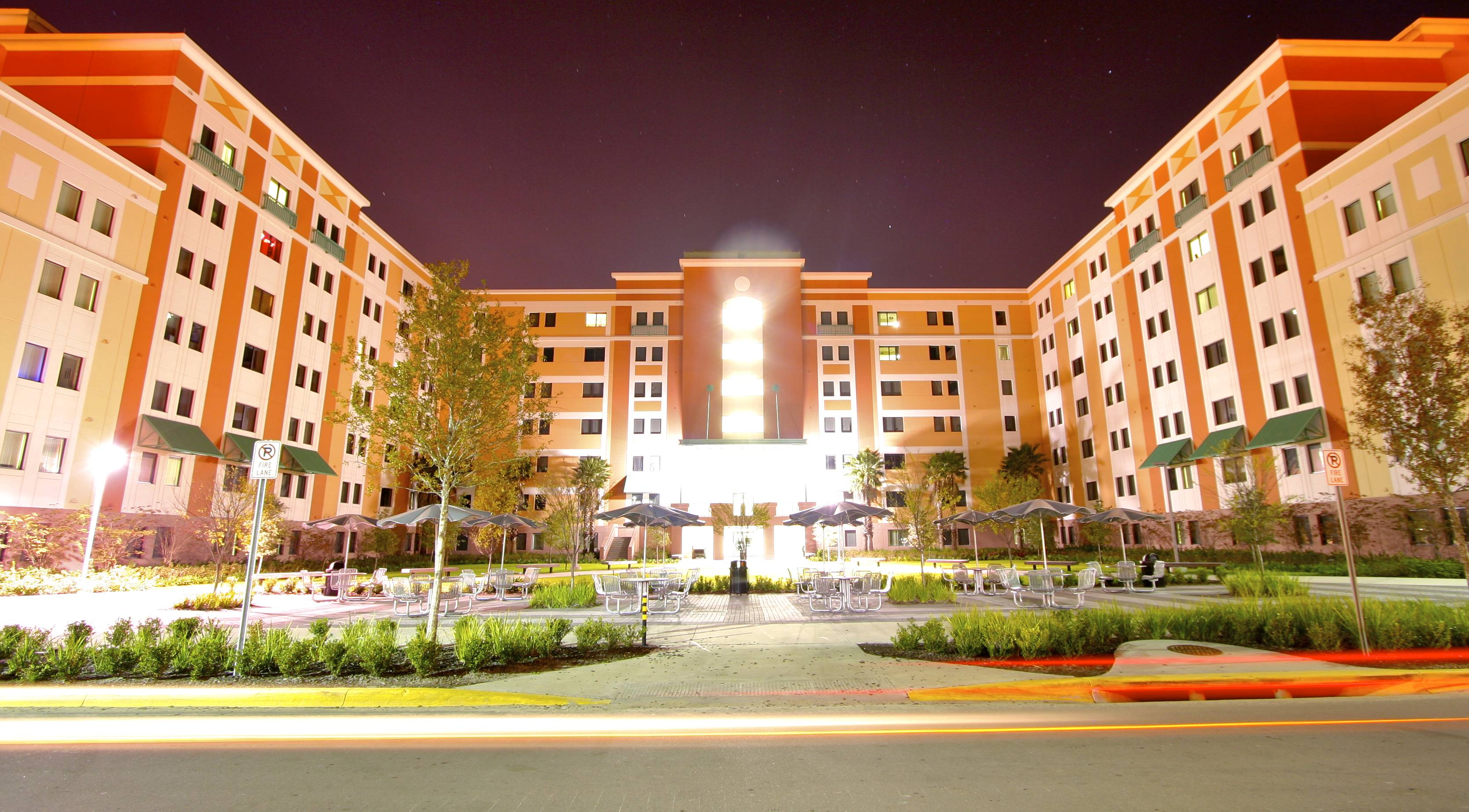
- Established: 1968; 58 years ago
- Students: About 11,700 total
- Location: Orlando, Florida, U.S.
- Website: housing.ucf.edu/

The residence hall system at the University of Central Florida in Orlando, Florida is administered by the Department of Housing and Residence Life. As of 2011, the system offers just under 6,500 beds on its main campus within five housing communities, 400 beds at the Rosen College of Hospitality Management, and 3,750 beds in university-affiliated housing.

Housing on the main campus is separated into five communities, the oldest being Apollo, and the newest residence hall being UnionWest at Creative Village in downtown Orlando. The majority of on-campus housing is occupied by freshmen, while the bulk of upper-class and graduate students live in off-campus apartments, houses, and cooperatives.

The Residence Hall Association (RHA) is the residence hall association for the university. All residents living in on-campus housing, UCF Affiliated Housing, or the Rosen College of Hospitality Management Housing are automatically members of RHA. They rebranded from the United Resident Student Association (URSA) to RHA in 2013.

== Overview ==
Tower I at Knights Plaza as viewed from its promenade

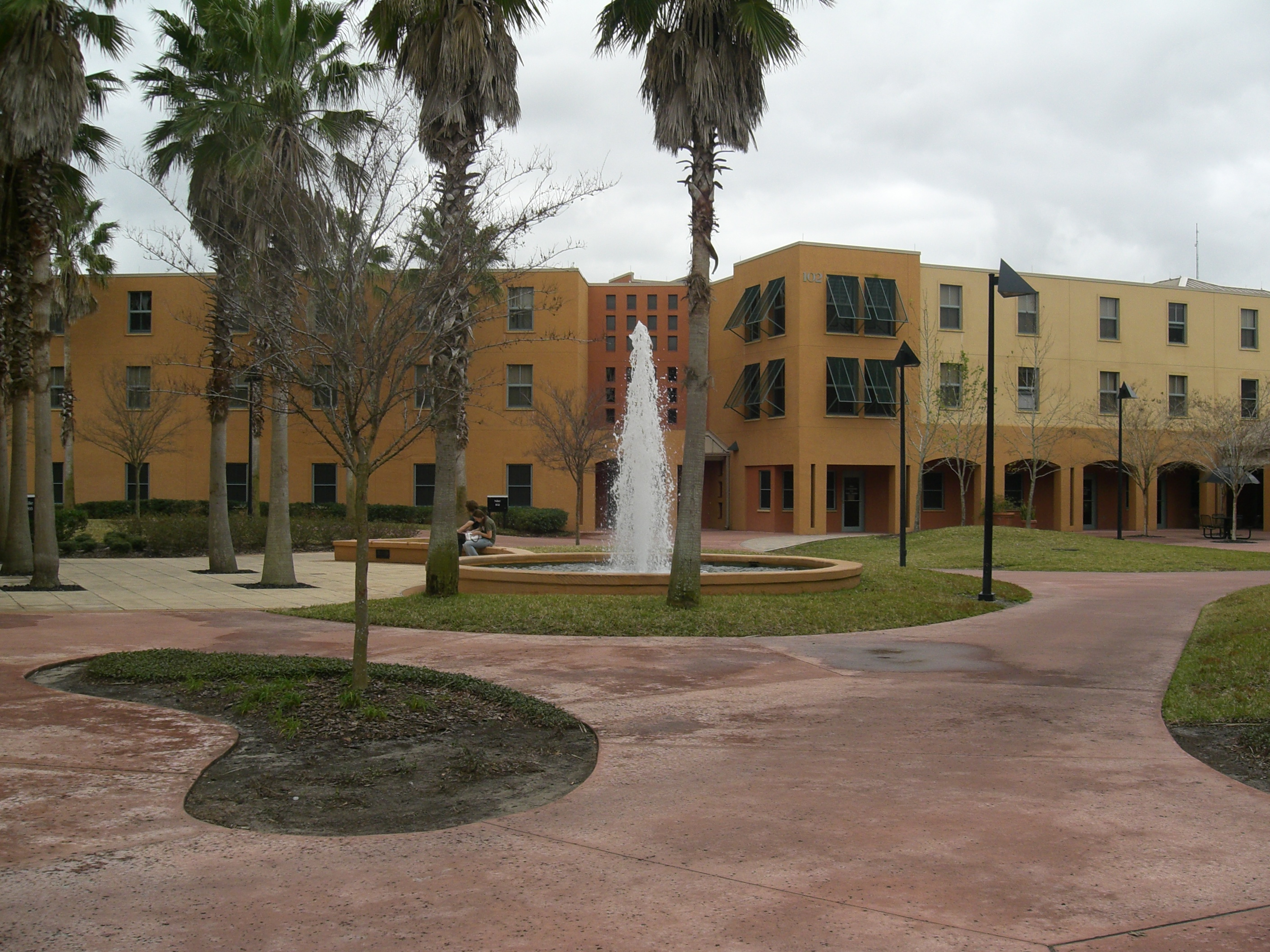
Academic Village

Residence hall style suites are available in the Libra, Apollo, Academic Village (Neptune, Hercules, and Nike) communities. All of the residence hall suites have bathrooms shared between two or three rooms as opposed to communal bathrooms. Apartment style housing is available in the Academic Village (Nike, Hercules and Neptune) communities, the Towers at Knights Plaza (Tower I, II, III, and IV), the Lake Claire Courtyard Apartments Community, and NorthView. UCF also has 400 beds at the Rosen College Apartments Community, located on the Rosen College of Hospitality Management campus. The Towers at Knights Plaza house the majority of the upper-classmen who live on campus.

Some communities have resident assistants, graduate assistants and area coordinators. On average, there is at least one resident assistant per 40-70 residents. The university currently employs 176 RAs, 17 Graduate Assistants, and 15 Area Coordinators.

In 2007, the university constructed the Towers at Knights Plaza, commonly known as "The Towers", as part of an athletic village known as Knights Plaza, which includes the CFE Arena, FBC Mortgage Stadium, as well as 183,000 square feet (17,000 m^{2}) of retail and restaurant space. The complex also features a Princeton Review and a secure mail room for students who live in the Towers. Apartments in the Towers are offered in three different floorplans: 1 bedroom/1 bathroom and 4 bedroom/4 bathroom, with the majority being 4 bedroom/2 bathroom. Each Tower houses approximately 500 residents. Tower III is a learning community for students enrolled in The Burnett Honors College, while a majority of student athletes are housed in Tower IV.

The Towers at Knights Plaza, Rosen College Apartments, and NorthView offer annual contracts to rent their apartments for a full academic year (fall, spring, and summer), whereas residents of all other standard housing communities on the main campus sign contracts to rent their rooms only for one or two semesters at a time.

To supplement the beds provided on campus, the university has partnered with two off-campus housing communities to create "University Affiliated-Housing." These communities consist of about 3,750 beds available at Knights Circle and The Pointe at Central. While both communities offer some UCF services such as UCF Police service, reduced rental rates, and shuttle service on class days, only Knights Circle is staffed with Community Assistants.

=== Future ===
Housing on the main campus typically fills to capacity well before the start of the fall semester and cannot accommodate everyone who applies. The university is planning to construct additional housing on its main campus, including a new community between Libra and the Academic Village, adjacent to the Recreation and Wellness Center. In addition, there are numerous private developments being constructed near the university.

== Communities ==
Below is a complete listing of all University-based housing communities:

=== Main campus housing ===
On-Campus Housing
Community	Number of Beds
Academic Village	2,288
Apollo	418
Libra	1,021
Lake Claire	744
Towers at Knights Plaza	2,004
Total	6,490

- Apollo Community – Includes Lake Hall, Volusia Hall, Osceola Hall, and Polk Hall; which were built in 1967 make them the oldest residence halls on campus, located in the west side of campus by the Math & Physics building and the 63 South dining area.
- Libra Community – Large resident hall buildings originally built in 1980 located in the southeast side of campus, near the Student Health Center & 63 South dining area.
- Lake Claire Courtyard Apartments Community – Apartment-style resident halls built in 1993 on the north side of campus near the Lake Claire recreation area.
- Academic Village
  - Nike Community – The eastern section of the Academic Village, which is located on the south end of campus contains both suite and apartment style residences and was constructed in 2001.
  - Hercules Community – The western section of the Academic Village, which is located on the south end of campus containing both suite and apartment style residences and was constructed in 2002.
  - Neptune Community – The southern section of the Academic Village, which is located on the south end of campus contains apartment style residences and was constructed in 2013.
- Towers at Knights Plaza – These are apartment style residence halls with the majority being 4 bedroom/2 bath or 4 bedroom/4 bath.
  - Towers I and II – Located on the north side of campus to the west of the Addition Financial Arena
  - Towers III and IV – Located on the north side of campus adjacent to Spectrum Stadium and the Addition Financial Arena

=== Greek Park ===
Greek housing is also available on the main campus in the Greek Park community, which consists of over 450 beds. There are nine sororities and four fraternities housed on campus. There was an additional fraternity house on campus that was demolished in May 2008, and two new houses along with a Greek Life Center are currently under construction in its location. All of the residences located in Greek Park, even though they are located on university property, are owned and maintained by their respective organizations, save for four houses that are owned by the university and rented to eligible organizations.

UCF plans on constructing a Greek Park II, which will have a much higher population density than that currently of Greek Park, when it becomes financially feasible for the university.

On-Campus Greek Housing

Greek Life Housing
Organization	Number of Beds
Alpha Delta Pi	32
Alpha Epsilon Phi*	37
Alpha Tau Omega	31
Alpha Xi Delta	30
Chi Omega*	40
Yup	52
Kappa Alpha Theta*	44
Kappa Delta	28
Kappa Kappa Gamma*	40
Kappa Sigma	24
Pi Beta Phi	30
Sigma Chi	33
Zeta Tau Alpha	40
Total	461

- Alpha Delta Pi
- Alpha Epsilon Phi* (formerly belonging to Theta Chi)
- Alpha Tau Omega
- Alpha Xi Delta
- Chi Omega*
- Delta Delta Delta
- Kappa Alpha Theta*
- Kappa Delta
- Kappa Kappa Gamma*
- Kappa Sigma
- Pi Beta Phi
- Sigma Chi
- Zeta Tau Alpha

Fraternities Known to Have Off-Campus Housing Options

- Beta Theta Pi
- Delta Tau Delta
- Delta Upsilon
- Lambda Chi Alpha
- Phi Gamma Delta
- Phi Delta Theta
- Sigma Nu
- Tau Kappa Epsilon
- Zeta Beta Tau

* Indicates Greek Housing that is owned by the university and not the respective Greek Life organization.

=== Off-Campus Housing ===
==== NorthView ====
Off-Campus Housing
Community	Number of Beds
NorthView	600
Rosen College Apartments	400
UnionWest at Creative Village	600
Total	1,600

NorthView located directly north of UCF's main campus, and within walking distance to Spectrum Stadium, is a luxury student housing community that was completed in 2013. The community houses 600 students and includes two faith-based community centers, the Hillel Jewish Student Center and the Catholic Campus Ministry center. Like all other learning communities on-campus, students must request to live specifically in this community, and the housing is not targeted at any specific faith. NorthView has similar accommodations as other housing communities such as shuttle transportation, key-card only access, and a resident mail center. It has additional amenities, including: an outdoor pool, rooftop tiki deck, study room, dry sauna, beach volleyball area, human-size chess board, indoor gym, entertainment lounge, and same-floor parking in the attached garage. Due to its location across county lines, its law enforcement jurisdiction falls under the Seminole County Sheriff's Office. The community is owned by a third-party but is managed by the UCF Department of Housing and Residence Life.

==== Rosen College Apartments ====
In 2005, the university opened two on-campus housing buildings at the Rosen College of Hospitality Management. The dorms are able to house 400 residents and 8 resident assistants. The community includes an outdoor pool, community center, outdoor grill area, and key-card only access to the building. The campus is under the law enforcement jurisdiction of the UCF Police Department and provides shuttles to the main campus on class days. Apartments on the campus are open to any UCF student, and are based upon academic leases for two semesters (fall/spring), with summer leases available.

===== UnionWest at Creative Village =====
UnionWest at Creative Village is located 14 miles away from UCF's main campus in the downtown Orlando. It is UCF Housing's newest community and opened in fall 2019. The 15-story structure is within walking distance of the Amway Center, Camping World, and the Bob Carr Theatre. UnionWest is a high-rise complex that combines academic classrooms (floors 1 through 5) and residential spaces (floors 6 through 15). The community houses 600 residents, has a connected parking garage, and retail space on the first floor. Similar to Knights Circle, students from UCF and from Valencia College can apply to live there. Leases are based on a three-semester basis (fall/spring/summer).

Affiliated Off-Campus Housing
Community	Number of Beds
Knights Circle	2,525
The Pointe at Central	1,224
Total	3,749

=== University Affiliated Housing ===
Affiliated housing is owned by the University of Central Florida Foundation, Inc. and is managed by Asset Campus Housing, which is the largest third-party property management company in the United States. Affiliated housing is patrolled by the UCF Police Department and offers shuttle service on class days.

- Knights Circle – Apartment complex directly west of UCF's Lake Claire across Alafaya Trail.
- The Pointe at Central – Apartment complex located south of UCF, off Alafaya Trail and just north of Colonial.

== See also ==
- University of Central Florida
- Knights Plaza at the University of Central Florida
