= South Florida–UCF football rivalry =

College sports rivalry

War on I–4: Football
- South Florida Bulls UCF Knights
- Locations: Tampa, Florida (Bulls); Orlando, Florida (Knights)
- Teams: University of South Florida; University of Central Florida
- First meeting: September 17, 2005; South Florida 31, UCF 14
- Latest meeting: November 26, 2022; UCF 46, South Florida 39
- Stadiums: South Florida: Raymond James Stadium; UCF: FBC Mortgage Stadium

Statistics
- Total meetings: 14
- All-time series: UCF leads 8–6
- Largest victory: South Florida, 64–12 (2007)
- Longest win streak: UCF, 6 (2017–present)
- Current win streak: UCF, 6 (2017–present)

Locations of South Florida and UCF

The South Florida–UCF football rivalry, better known as the War on I-4, is an American college football rivalry between the South Florida Bulls football team of the University of South Florida and UCF Knights football team of the University of Central Florida. As of the 2022 meeting, the Knights hold a 8–6 lead in the series.

== History ==
=== Early plans ===
Discussions about scheduling a game between the Knights and Bulls began shortly after South Florida fielded its first NCAA Division I-AA team in 1997. Supporters suggested such a rivalry could help generate interest and revenue for both burgeoning teams. The prospect became more serious when the Bulls entered Division I-A in 2001 and was very popular among fans, but as it would be a non-conference series, difficulties arose. UCF had overbooked its future schedules and would have to break commitments. Meanwhile, South Florida officials worried that their young program stood to take in less revenue from a home-and-away series against UCF than it would with an additional home game on the schedule. Serious planning for a series did not commence until 2003.

=== First games (2005–2008) ===
By 2003, serious discussions resumed as both schools had joined conferences – South Florida joined Conference USA (C-USA) in 2001, while UCF joined the Mid-American Conference (MAC) in 2002. That year, the schools' athletics directors met and agreed to schedule games for the 2005 and 2006 seasons. Subsequently, South Florida joined the Big East, an Automatic Qualifying conference, in 2005, while UCF joined C-USA the same year. The Bulls won both games, which both drew crowds over 45,000. The series was extended for 2007 and 2008 as part of an agreement with C-USA that the Bulls play a member of the conference annually for five years. South Florida won these games as well, with a 64–12 blowout in 2007 and 31–24 overtime thriller in 2008. South Florida declined to schedule further games in the series, indicating it wished to pursue more competitive and high-profile opponents. During the series hiatus South Florida would go on to play opponents such as Florida, Florida State, Miami, Clemson, and Notre Dame; beating all except for Florida at least once.

The two schools discussed scheduling more games over the next several years, including a failed proposal by South Florida to play at the Citrus Bowl in 2011. In addition, a possible head-to-head matchup at the 2009 St. Petersburg Bowl failed to materialize. Bowl and city officials decided against pitting the two nearby schools, as they preferred at least one distant team so that more out of town fans would book hotel rooms in the area. UCF instead faced Rutgers in the game.

=== Renewed series (2013–2022) ===
UCF was admitted to join USF in the Big East Conference in 2011 and was set to begin playing there in the 2013–2014 school year. Conference realignment turned the Big East into the American Athletic Conference prior to the fall 2013 season. For the first time, both schools were part of the same conference, and the rivalry resumed as a regular conference match beginning with the 2013 season.

Since 2013, the games have been scheduled for Thanksgiving weekend. From 2015 to 2019, the AAC was split into divisions, with both schools placed in the East Division. In 2015, the game was played on Thanksgiving night, and in 2016, the game was played on the Saturday of that week. However, in most years it has been scheduled for Black Friday, the day after Thanksgiving.

=== Trophy and all-sports series ===
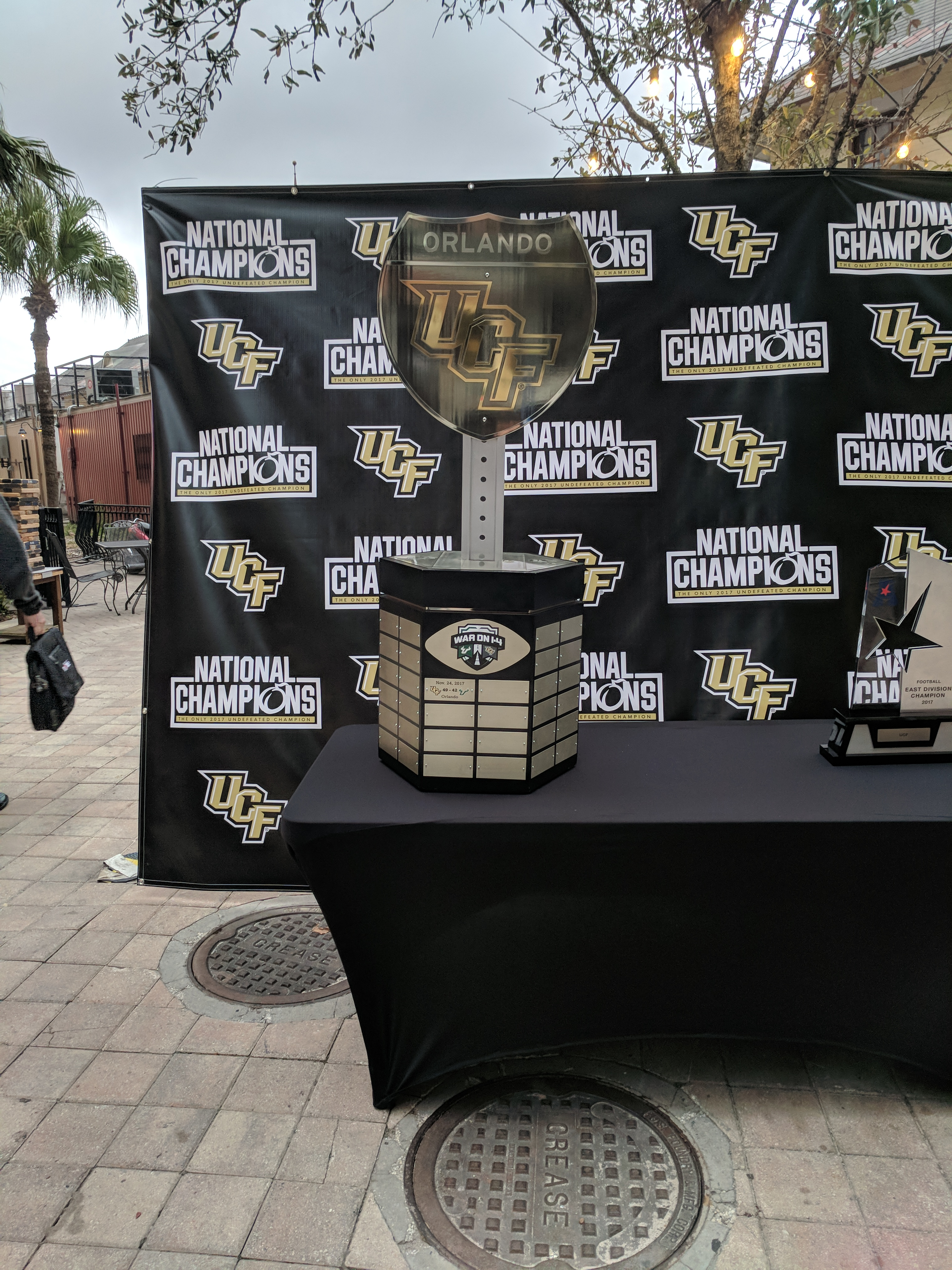
The UCF/Orlando side of the trophy

Beginning with the 2016 edition, the athletic departments of both universities announced the official recognition of the "War on I-4" rivalry trophy and all-sports series. The winner of the game each year takes possession of a large trophy shaped like the iconic I-4 road sign, which will be displayed on their campus for the following year. Including the base, the trophy measures 4 feet, 3 inches tall and weighs 160 pounds. The "road sign" part of the trophy detaches from the base, which has a plaque listing all the previous winners and scores. One side of the road sign part of the trophy reads "Tampa" and features USF's logo while the other reads "Orlando" and features UCF's logo.

For the all-sports series, which also began in 2016, each of the 14 sports in which the Bulls and Knights compete against each other is worth six "points" and the number of points each game is worth depends on the number of regular season meetings between the teams (for example, the football game is worth six points because the teams only meet once in the regular season, but each men's basketball game is worth three points because the teams meet twice in the regular season). For sports like golf and cross country which do not directly compete against each other, the six points are awarded to the higher finisher at the American Athletic Conference championship. The team with more points at the end of the year is declared the winner and receives a trophy similar to the football one.

=== Future ===
With UCF set to leave the American Athletic Conference for the Big 12 Conference beginning in the 2023–24 school year, the rivalry series has been unable to continue in the prior format. The next year when both teams have multiple openings in their non-conference schedules is 2031, making that the next possible meeting, unless the two teams are selected to face each other in a bowl game or in the College Football Playoff.

During 2026, the ADs of both schools attempted to revive the rivalry, but reached an impasse with negotiations, with UCF only willing to play only a home game at their stadium with no return trip, as is consistent with their football scheduling practices against school in Group of Six conferences, and South Florida only willing to schedule a set if it included games at both schools. As a last resort, South Florida proposed a four-game set with one game played at each school's respective on-campus stadiums and one game played at a neutral site in proximity to each respective school, which was declined by UCF. Terry Mohajir, the UCF athletic director, did state that if South Florida was to join any of the Power conferences besides the Big 12 Conference, he would gladly agree to scheduling them in an annual home and home set to meet the conference's power opponent scheduling requirement, citing that they would be able to stay in the state of Florida to meet the requirement.

== Game results ==
Since 2005, the Bulls and Knights have played fourteen times. The Knights lead the series, 8–6. The game has been played in two cities and three stadiums: Raymond James Stadium in Tampa, Florida, and Camping World Stadium and FBC Mortgage Stadium in Orlando, Florida. UCF holds a 8–2 series lead in conference games against USF.

South Florida victories	UCF victories

No.	Date	Location	Winner	Score
1	September 17, 2005	Tampa, FL	South Florida	31–14
2	September 16, 2006	Orlando, FL	South Florida	24–17
3	October 6, 2007	Tampa, FL	#5 South Florida	64–12
4	September 6, 2008	Orlando, FL	#17 South Florida	31–24^{OT}
5	November 29, 2013	Orlando, FL	#19 UCF	23–20
6	November 28, 2014	Tampa, FL	UCF	16–0
7	November 26, 2015	Orlando, FL	South Florida	44–3
8	November 26, 2016	Tampa, FL	South Florida	48–31

No.	Date	Location	Winner	Score
9	November 24, 2017	Orlando, FL	#15 UCF	49–42
10	November 23, 2018	Tampa, FL	#9 UCF	38–10
11	November 29, 2019	Orlando, FL	UCF	34–7
12	November 27, 2020	Tampa, FL	UCF	58–46
13	November 26, 2021	Orlando, FL	UCF	17–13
14	November 26, 2022	Tampa, FL	#22 UCF	46–39
Series: UCF leads 8–6

Bold dates indicate conference games
Italic dates indicate games that count toward the trophy series

== Game notes ==
=== 2005 ===
Team	1	2	3	4	Total
Golden Knights	0	0	7	7	14
• Bulls	7	14	7	3	31

- Location: Raymond James Stadium, Tampa, FL
- Game start: 7:00 p.m.
- Game attendance: 45,139
- Television network: FSN

A crowd of 45,139, second largest at the time in South Florida's eight year football history, watched the Bulls build a 21–0 halftime lead on the strength of a relentless running attack that finished with 326 yards. Andre Hall ran for 155 yards and scored two touchdowns to help South Florida beat UCF 31–14.

UCF was held to 45 yards rushing and was shut out until Joe Burnett returned a third quarter punt 60 yards to the South Florida 4, setting up Steven Moffett's touchdown run on the next play. Moffett also threw a 9-yard TD pass to Brandon Marshall late in the fourth quarter.

One play after Hall nearly scored on a 17-yard run, Pat Julmiste added South Florida's last TD on 1 yard quarterback sneak late in the third quarter. Kyle Bronson added a fourth quarter field goal to make it 31–7.

=== 2006 ===
Team	1	2	3	4	Total
• Bulls	7	0	3	14	24
Golden Knights	0	10	0	7	17

- Location: Florida Citrus Bowl, Orlando, FL
- Game start: 2:30 p.m.
- Game attendance: 46,708
- Television network: CBSSN

South Florida freshman quarterback Matt Grothe threw for 302 yards, eclipsing Marquel Blackwell's 239 yard game against New Haven in 1999 for the program single game passing record. Grothe also ran for 73 yards, second most by a freshman quarterback in South Florida history behind only his own record of 82 from earlier that season.

=== 2007 ===
Team	1	2	3	4	Total
Knights	7	3	0	2	12
• #5 Bulls	12	17	14	21	64

- Location: Raymond James Stadium, Tampa, FL
- Game start: 12:00 p.m.
- Game attendance: 65,948
- Television network: ESPNU

The Bulls defeated the cross state Knights 64–12 in front of a home crowd announced at 65,948. The Bulls held the Knights to just 145 total yards and Kevin Smith, who came in as the nation's leading rusher at 172 yards per game, to just 55 yards. It would be the only time during the season that a defense held Smith to under 100 yards. South Florida gained 543 total yards—over three times as many as UCF—while holding the ball three fewer minutes than the Knights. UCF scored their only offensive points—a Kyle Israel rush for a touchdown, and a field goal—in the first half. UCF and South Florida would also exchange safeties.

=== 2008 ===
Team	1	2	3	4	OT	Total
• #17 Bulls	10	0	14	0	7	31
Knights	7	3	0	14	0	24

- Location: Bright House Networks Stadium, Orlando, FL
- Game start: 7:00 p.m.
- Game attendance: 46,805
- Television network: ESPN2

In what was the final meeting of the War on I-4 for many years, the visiting Bulls downed the Knights 31–24 in a closely contested overtime battle. With UCF trailing 24–10 late in the 4th quarter, quarterback Michael Greco threw two touchdown passes in less than a minute, including passes of 13 yards to Corey Rabazinski and 31 yards to Rocky Ross, to tie the game at 24 with 1:40 remaining in regulation. South Florida won the game when they stopped UCF on a 4th and short in overtime. USF players were criticized for bringing shovels onto the field after the game as a final gesture to "bury the Knights".

=== 2013 ===
Team	1	2	3	4	Total
Bulls	3	3	7	7	20
• #17 Knights	3	10	3	7	23

- Location: Bright House Networks Stadium, Orlando, FL
- Game start: 8:00 p.m.
- Game attendance: 45,952
- Television network: ESPN

Despite turning the ball over five times, the Knights found a way to earn their first victory in the rivalry against South Florida. Running back Storm Johnson fumbled the ball on UCF's first two drives, including a drop at the Bulls 10 yard line. Trailing with under five minutes left in regulation, UCF quarterback Blake Bortles found wide receiver Breshad Perriman for a 52-yard go ahead touchdown reception. With 1:20 left in the fourth quarter and charging down the field, South Florida quarterback Mike White was intercepted by CB Jordan Ozerities, and he returned the ball 52 yards to the Bulls 37 yard line. The Knights ran out the clock for the victory.

=== 2014 ===
Team	1	2	3	4	Total
• Knights	0	14	2	0	16
Bulls	0	0	0	0	0

- Location: Raymond James Stadium, Tampa, FL
- Game start: 12:00 p.m.
- Game attendance: 36,963
- Television network: ESPN2

After a scoreless first quarter, Justin Holman led the Knights on a 17 play, 80 yard scoring drive to open the second quarter. The Knights held the Bulls offense to a three and out on the next series, which was followed by an 8 play, 73 yard scoring drive by UCF capped off by a 21-yard run from Rannell Hall. UCF held South Florida to 200 yards of total offense, 5 yards rushing, and forced three turnovers on downs. The Bulls missed a field goal and were not able to convert on three UCF turnovers. This was the first time that South Florida had been shut out at home.

=== 2015 ===
Team	1	2	3	4	Total
• Bulls	7	17	14	6	44
Knights	3	0	0	0	3

- Location: Bright House Networks Stadium, Orlando, FL
- Game start: 7:30 p.m.
- Game attendance: 25,967
- Television network: ESPN

After scoring a field goal on their first drive, the Knights were shut out by the Bulls defense. The Bulls held UCF to 203 yards of total offense and caught two interceptions. Scoring 44 unanswered points and gaining 455 offensive yards, South Florida handed UCF their twelfth loss of the season, guaranteeing their second winless campaign since 2004. For the first time since 1995, UCF wore black jerseys and black pants. USF, on the other hand, completed one of the biggest single season turnarounds in college football history to finish 8–4 after a 1–3 start. This was the first, and to date, only time the game has been held on Thanksgiving night.

=== 2016 ===
Team	1	2	3	4	Total
Knights	7	7	10	7	31
• Bulls	14	10	7	17	48

- Location: Raymond James Stadium, Tampa, FL
- Game start: 12:00 p.m.
- Game attendance: 36,056
- Television network: CBSSN

The 2016 game was the first official War on I-4 football game and both teams entered the game having already secured bowl eligibility (UCF was 6–5 and USF was 9–2), for the first time since the 2007 meeting. This game is notable for escalating tensions between the two sides. Rather than taking a knee and ending the game with the Bulls leading by 10 in the closing seconds at the UCF one-yard line, USF coach Willie Taggart ran one final play for a touchdown, leading to a shoving match between the teams. Following the game, USF was ranked in both the AP and Coaches polls.

=== 2017 ===
Team	1	2	3	4	Total
#22 Bulls	7	13	14	8	42
• #13 Knights	21	0	7	21	49

- Location: Spectrum Stadium, Orlando, FL
- Game start: 3:30 p.m.
- Game attendance: 47,129
- TV announcers (ABC): Adam Amin, Dusty Dvoracek, and Molly McGrath

The 13th ranked Knights welcomed the 22nd ranked Bulls (9–1) to Spectrum Stadium with the winner of the game claiming the American Athletic Conference East Division title and a spot in the 2017 American Athletic Conference Football Championship Game. The game was the first ranked matchup in the rivalry. The game quickly turned into an offensive shootout, with a total of 1,186 yards of offense from both teams, including a school record 605 yards from USF quarterback Quinton Flowers. The game came down to the wire, with UCF taking an eight-point lead (following an earlier missed PAT from USF) with 2:21 left in the game. USF then tied the game with an 83-yard touchdown and a two-point conversion with 1:41 left. On the ensuing kickoff, UCF's Mike Hughes returned the kickoff for a 95-yard touchdown, giving the Knights a 49–42 lead, with 1:28 left. The Bulls attempted to strike back, but Bulls tight end Mitchell Wilcox fumbled on the UCF 45 yard line, following a 10-yard catch, and UCF linebacker Chequan Burkett recovered to seal the game. The game was called one of the best of the season.

=== 2018 ===
Team	1	2	3	4	Total
• #9 Knights	7	10	7	14	38
Bulls	0	3	7	0	10

- Location: Raymond James Stadium, Tampa, FL
- Game start: 4:15 p.m.
- Game attendance: 57,626
- Television network: ESPN

The Knights defeated the Bulls 38–10, however, the game was marred by the devastating, season ending injury to starting quarterback McKenzie Milton. Twice in the first half the Knights stopped the Bulls when they went for it on 4th down. Milton led the Knights on a 97-yard drive capped off by a 14-yard touchdown pass to Gabe Davis, and a 7–0 lead. Early in the second quarter, facing a 3rd & 7 at the USF 30, McKenzie Milton scrambled to the right and was upended after a diving tackle by Mazzi Wilkins. Milton suffered a "traumatic" knee injury, and was carted off the field and brought to Tampa General Hospital for surgery. After a lengthy delay, the game resumed with Matthew Wright kicking a 42-yard field goal for a 10–0 lead.

Darriel Mack Jr. took over at quarterback, and despite the pall cast over the game, the Knights rallied behind him to soundly defeat the Bulls. Mack threw for 81 yards in substitute, but it was the running game that took over in the second half. Greg McCrae rushed 181 yards on 16 carries, and three touchdowns. The Knights ended with 391 yard rushing, with Taj McGowan adding a touchdown in the fourth quarter. The Knights clinched their second consecutive undefeated regular season on their way to their second straight win in the AAC Championship Game.

=== 2019 ===
Team	1	2	3	4	Total
Bulls	0	0	7	0	7
• Knights	7	17	7	3	34

- Location: Spectrum Stadium, Orlando, FL
- Game start: 8:00 p.m.
- Game attendance: 45,216
- Television network: ESPN

The Knights took the opening kickoff and drove 65 yards in twelve plays, including four third down conversions. Gabe Davis made a leaping catch near the back of the endzone from Dillon Gabriel for the game's first touchdown. Early in the second quarter, Adrian Killins ran for a 35-yard touchdown run to put UCF up 14–0. Gabriel and Davis connected for a second touchdown pass and a 21–0 lead. With under a minute remaining in the half, tempers flared as four players, two on each team, received unsportsmanlike conduct penalties. As Killins was being tackled, he grabbed the facemask of USF defensive back Nick Roberts, triggering a big scuffle. The incident came after another pregame skirmish during warm ups. Officials quickly broke things up, and a few moments later, Dylan Barnas kicked a 50-yard field goal. UCF led 24–0 at halftime.

Darriel Mack Jr. took snaps at quarterback in the second half, scoring on a 2-yard touchdown run in the third quarter. Trailing 34–7, the Bulls drove into Knights territory midway through the fourth quarter. With 5:10 remaining in regulation, facing 4th & Goal at the UCF 3 yard line, Bulls quarterback Jordan McCloud was intercepted by Eriq Gilyard at the 5 yard line. UCF ran out the clock and secured the victory.

=== 2020 ===
Team	1	2	3	4	Total
• Knights	14	17	14	13	58
Bulls	7	7	14	18	46

- Location: Raymond James Stadium, Tampa, FL
- Game start: 3:30 p.m.
- Game attendance: 8,801 (Note: Under local laws due to COVID-19, maximum stadium capacity was limited.)
- Television network: ESPN

The 5–3 Knights came into Tampa as 25.5 point favorites against the 1–7 Bulls, who were missing nine players including starting quarterback Noah Johnson, running back Johnny Ford, and cornerback K.J. Sails because of COVID-19 protocols. USF wasn't deterred though, and took the opening drive 50 yards before failing to convert on a fake field goal. The USF defense forced a quick punt from the Knights, then the sides traded touchdowns. The Knights took a 14–7 lead after their next drive and never looked back. USF missed a 46-yard field goal, which led to a 2 play, 71-yard touchdown drive for UCF. After each team traded punts, USF running back Kelley Joiner fumbled near midfield which led to another UCF touchdown. The Bulls scored a touchdown of their own on their next drive, then the Knights made a field goal with nine seconds left in the first half to take a 31–14 lead into the locker room.

The Knights received the ball to start the second half, and were quickly forced into a three-and-out. The same happened to the Bulls on their next possession, and then to the Knights again. USF and UCF both scored touchdowns on each of their next two drives, putting the score at 45–28 Knights at the end of the third quarter. After a Bulls field goal, USF's Dwayne Boyles intercepted UCF quarterback Dillon Gabriel at the UCF 48 yard line, leading to a 3 play touchdown drive to put the Bulls down by seven points with just over 10 minutes left in regulation. This is the closest USF would come to stealing the lead back though, as they fumbled on their next possession leading to a UCF touchdown. The teams traded garbage time touchdowns before UCF took over with 14 seconds left, and Gabriel took a knee to run out the clock.

=== 2021 ===
Team	1	2	3	4	Total
Bulls	7	0	6	0	13
• Knights	7	7	0	3	17

- Location: Bounce House, Orlando, FL
- Game start: 3:30 p.m.
- Game attendance: 41,157
- Television network: ESPN

The Knights received the opening kickoff and made it all the way down to the USF 18, but UCF kicker Daniel Obarski missed the 35-yard field goal. The Knight defense stood firm and forced a quick punt from the Bulls, and their offense led by backup quarterback Mikey Keene scored a touchdown on the next drive. The Bulls scored a touchdown of their own on the next drive after a 5-yard run by true freshman quarterback Timmy McClain just as time expired in the first quarter. South Florida's defense then forced a quick 3 and out, but the Knights defense did the same on the following drive. On the Knight's next possession, Daniel Obarski missed his second field goal of the game, this time from 45 yards away. Bulls kicker Spencer Shrader did the same on the next Bulls drive, but from 48 yards. The teams traded 3 and outs again, and UCF's Titus Mokiao-Atimalala returned USF's punt all the way down to the Bulls 27 yard line with just over a minute left in the half. Brandon Johnson caught a 7-yard touchdown pass to give UCF a 14–7 lead going in to the break.

The second half started with a Bulls drive culminating in a 41-yard field goal by Spencer Shrader. The USF defense, despite being ranked 119th out of the 130 FBS teams going into the game, forced the Knights into a third 3 and out. Shrader kicked another field goal on the next Bulls drive from 36 yards away to make it a one-point game. The teams traded 3 and outs again as they went in to the fourth quarter. The Knights gave themselves some breathing room after a 32-yard field goal on their next drive, then forced a quick punt from USF. After a short Knights possession, the Bulls got the ball back on their own 16 yard line with just over two minutes left in the game. During a drive which included a 35-yard pass to Xavier Weaver and a 14-yard McClain run on 3rd and long, the Bulls made it down to the UCF 3 yard line with 27 seconds left. With 8 seconds remaining, McClain was sacked at the UCF 9, but he threw the ball as he hit the ground. The ball was caught by UCF defensive back Quadric Bullard, who ran with the ball believing it to be intercepted. Since the game clock expired during the play, the referee ruled that the game was over, giving the Knights their fifth-straight win over the Bulls.

=== 2022 ===
Team	1	2	3	4	Total
• Knights	14	14	3	15	46
Bulls	0	7	22	10	39

- Location: Raymond James Stadium, Tampa, FL
- Game start: 7:00 p.m.
- Game attendance: 32,217
- Television network: ESPN2

The final War on I-4 game for the foreseeable future began with UCF receiving the kickoff for a touchback. The Knights scored a touchdown on just the sixth play, capped off by a 64-yard run by quarterback John Rhys Plumlee. The Bulls, with true freshman Byrum Brown (their 4th-string at the beginning of the season before two quarterbacks suffered season ending injuries and one transferred out of the program) making just his second start as their quarterback punted on their next possession. UCF scored another touchdown after getting the ball back to make the score 14–0. On their next drive, the Bulls made it all the way to the UCF 7 yard line before Byrum Brown fumbled, leading to another UCF touchdown. Brown threw an interception on the Bulls next drive and UCF scored another touchdown, making the score 28–0. The Bulls finally got on the board with a touchdown 40 seconds before halftime. On that drive, there was a fight on the sidelines after Brown was hit late by UCF's Koby Perry after running out of bounds, and the referees gave every player on both teams an unsportsmanlike conduct penalty.

The Bulls received the ball to start the second half. UCF's Koby Perry was ejected for targeting on the third play of the half, but soon after the Bulls turned the ball over for the third time after another Byrum Brown fumble, leading to a UCF field goal. The Bulls scored on their next drive after a 68-yard run by Brian Battie, and made a two-point conversion to make the score 31–15. The Knights turned the ball over on their next drive leading to a quick touchdown and two point conversion for the bulls, making the score 31–23. The Knights fumbled again on their next offensive play leading to another Bulls touchdown, but they failed on the two point conversion. The Knights scored on their next drive and the Bulls answered with a field goal, followed by the Bulls defense forcing a quick 3-and-out. Byrum Brown scored on a 42-yard run to give the Bulls their first lead of the game at 39–38 with 7:02 remaining. The Knights fumbled on their next drive, but the defense forced a 3-and-out and got the ball back with 2:43 remaining. They scored a touchdown and two point conversion with 20 seconds left in the game, and the Bulls last-second hail mary was thrown too high for wide receiver Holden Willis, and the Knights survived to win the game 46–39. Another scuffle broke out on the field after UCF DT Kervins Choute attempted to plant a UCF flag on the USF logo at midfield, but was stopped by USF OL Demetris Harris.

This was the last meeting between the teams, as UCF joined the Big 12 Conference the following year. The next year the series could continue is 2026, as that is the earliest that both teams have openings in their non-conference schedule.
