= Acrisure Bounce House =

American football stadium located near Orlando, Florida

- The Bounce House
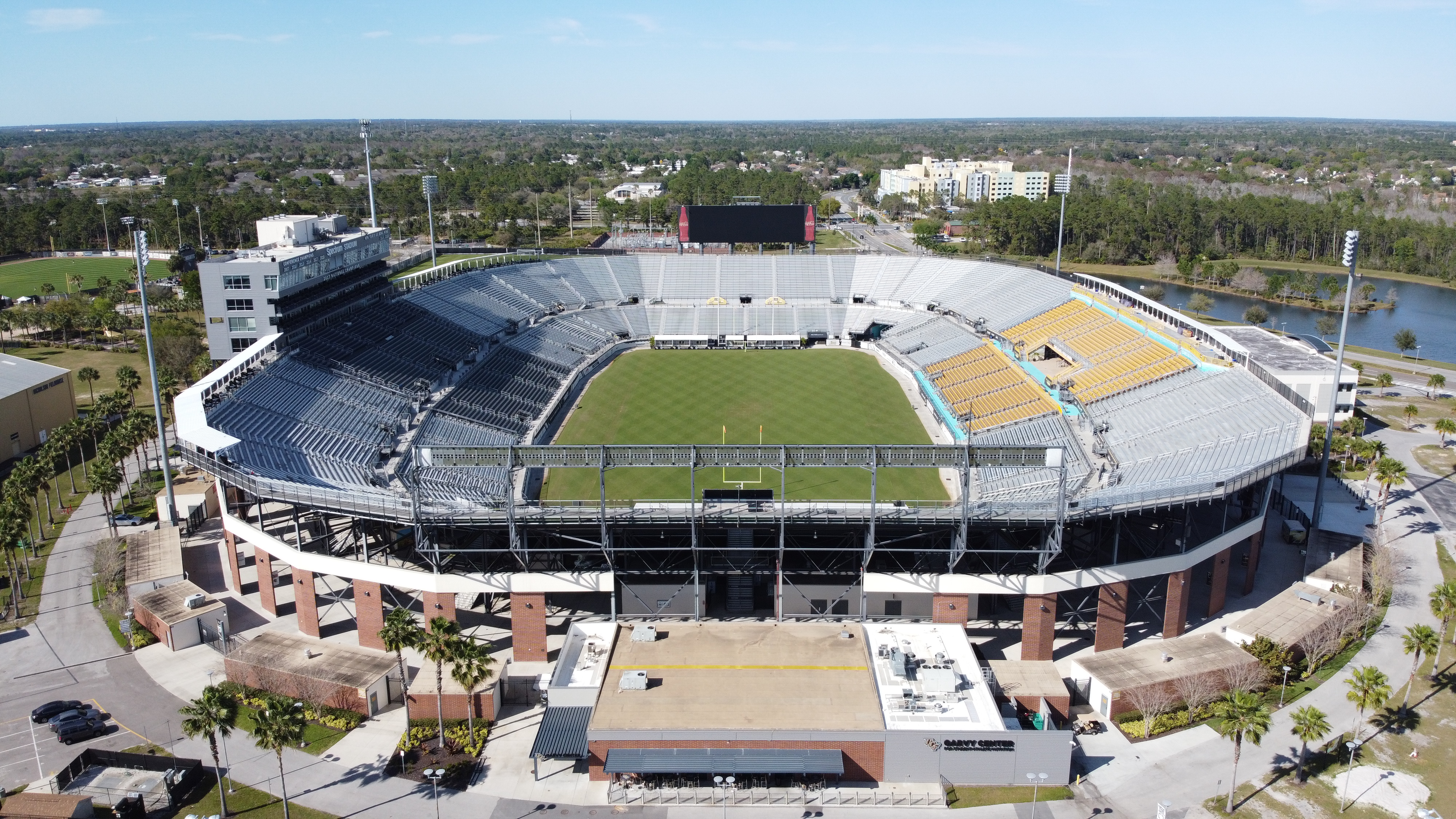
- The stadium in 2020

- Location in Florida Location in the United States
- Former names: Bright House Networks Stadium (2007–2017); Spectrum Stadium (2017–2020); Bounce House (2020–2021); FBC Mortgage Stadium (2022–2024)
- Location: 4465 Knights Victory Way; Orlando, Florida 32816; United States
- Coordinates: 28.6091°N 81.1924°W
- Owner: University of Central Florida
- Capacity: 45,906 (2026–present) Former capacity List: 44,206 (2014–2025); 45,323 (2007–2009)
- Executive suites: 62
- Surface: Tifway 419 Bermuda
- Scoreboard: 114 feet (35 m) x 36 feet (11 m)
- Record attendance: 48,453 (2009)
- Public transit: UCF Transit Center,

Construction
- Groundbreaking: March 22, 2006; 20 years ago
- Opened: September 15, 2007; 19 years ago
- Renovated: 2014–15, 2017
- Expanded: 2026
- Cost: $55 million ($87.8 million in 2025 dollars)
- Architect: 360 Architecture
- General contractor: Wharton-Smith

Tenants
- UCF Knights (NCAA) (2007–present); Florida Cup (2017–2018); Orlando Apollos (AAF) (2019); Hula Bowl (2022–present); Cure Bowl (2023) (2026–present)

The Acrisure Bounce House (also known as simply the Bounce House) is an American football stadium located in the Orlando metropolitan area in Orange County, Florida, United States, on the main campus of the University of Central Florida. It is the home field of the UCF Knights of NCAA Division I FBS college football. It is the current site for the 2026 Cure Bowl (while renovations are underway at nearby Camping World Stadium), and has also hosted the Hula Bowl. It was also the home field for the now defunct Orlando Apollos during the first and only season of the Alliance of American Football (2019).

The stadium opened in 2007, replacing Camping World Stadium (then known as the Citrus Bowl) in Downtown Orlando as the home of the Knights, where they had played since their inaugural season in 1979. The steel and brick-clad stadium was designed by 360 Architecture and constructed in 18 months. The stadium was designed for 48,000 capacity when it opened in 2007 and is designed for an expansion to 65,000 seats. The stadium underwent an $8 million renovation following the 2014 season. The Wayne Densch Center for Student-Athlete Leadership was built on the east façade of the stadium, and a party deck was added to the east stands. Following renovations completed in 2014, the stadium’s seating capacity was 44,206 until 2025. Following the completion of the Roth Tower expansion for the 2026 season, the stadium’s capacity increased to 45,906.

The facility's nickname of the "Bounce House" was due to it being susceptible to considerable shaking when its crowd jumps in unison. Measures were undertaken following the stadium's inaugural season to reduce these effects to ensure safety. Officially, the stadium was formerly known as Bright House Networks Stadium (2007–2017), Spectrum Stadium (2017–2020), and FBC Mortgage Stadium (2022–2025).

On May 31, 2022, FBC Mortgage entered a ten-year, $19.5 million deal with UCF for the naming rights of the stadium beginning July 1, 2022. On July 1, 2025, the FBC Mortgage company was rebranded to Acrisure, and the stadium was renamed Acrisure Bounce House.

== Location ==
The stadium is located on the northeastern edge of UCF's 1,415-acre (573 ha) main campus, which is approximately 13 miles (21 km) northeast of Downtown Orlando, 55 miles (89 km) southwest of Daytona Beach, and 35 miles (56 km) west of the Kennedy Space Center. The stadium's 50-yard-line is lined up latitudinally with Launch Pad 39A, to symbolize UCF's longstanding partnership with NASA and other space agencies. The stadium is part of the Kenneth G. Dixon Athletics Village and is bordered by McCulloch Road on the north side, Knights Plaza on the west side, and Orion Boulevard on the southern and eastern sides.

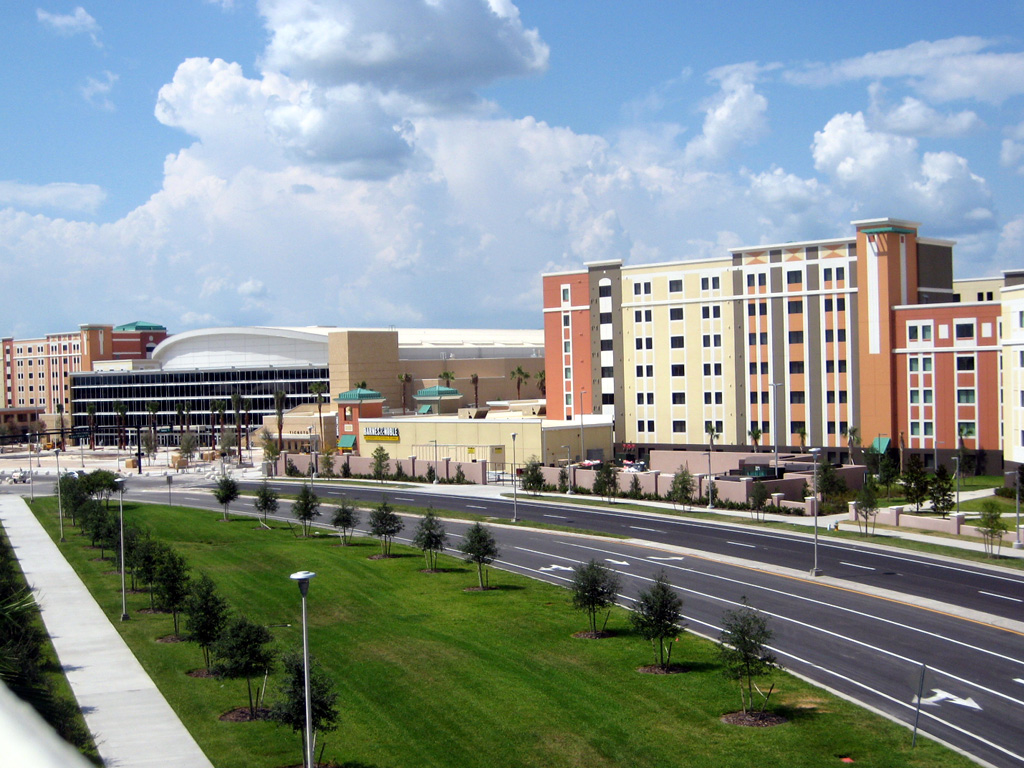
Knights Plaza, part of the Kenneth G. Dixon Athletics Village.

To the west in Knights Plaza is the Addition Financial Arena, The Venue, John Euliano Park, and the UCF Track and Soccer Complex. Also located in Knights Plaza are The Towers residence halls, housing 2,000 UCF students, including student-athletes.

== History ==
From 1979 to 2006, the Knights played their home games at the Citrus Bowl in downtown Orlando. Located about 15 miles (24 km) from UCF's main campus, the stadium is also the home of the Citrus Bowl game, and numerous neutral site games. However, the stadium had been built in 1936 and had fallen into a dilapidated state by the 2000s. School officials were dissatisfied with the poor condition of the facility and lack of revenue generated from games. The stadium's capacity (65,000) was considered too large for the Knights, and the location off-campus was considered a significant factor in the inability to sustain a sizeable student section. When the university approached the city about renovations and new revenue-sharing measures, they were met with resistance. While the city had expressed interest in renovating the Citrus Bowl with or without UCF's support, funding was seriously in doubt. The city was in the planning stages for a new arena, new performing arts center, and "creative village", with stadium renovations seemingly taking less priority.

In early 2005, the university abandoned the efforts to renovate the Citrus Bowl, and conducted a feasibility study to construct an on-campus stadium. Along with playing in a modern facility, and generating revenue, additional motivations included drawing more students to the games, a more intimate setting, and establishing game-day traditions on campus. With UCF's main campus one of the largest in the nation, building an on-campus stadium was also seen as a way to grow the university. In December 2005, the UCF Board of Trustees approved the construction of the new on-campus stadium. The facility, initially known as UCF Stadium, was hoped to be ready for the 2006 season. However, construction was delayed due to concerns from local residents regarding potentially falling property values and noise levels from the stadium.

Construction broke ground on March 22, 2006. Two months later, it was announced that the Texas Longhorns would be the first opponent for the UCF Knights in the new stadium. The game, the first of three scheduled meetings between the schools, was held September 15, 2007. A sellout crowd of 45,622 saw the Knights put a scare into the Longhorns before falling, 35–32.

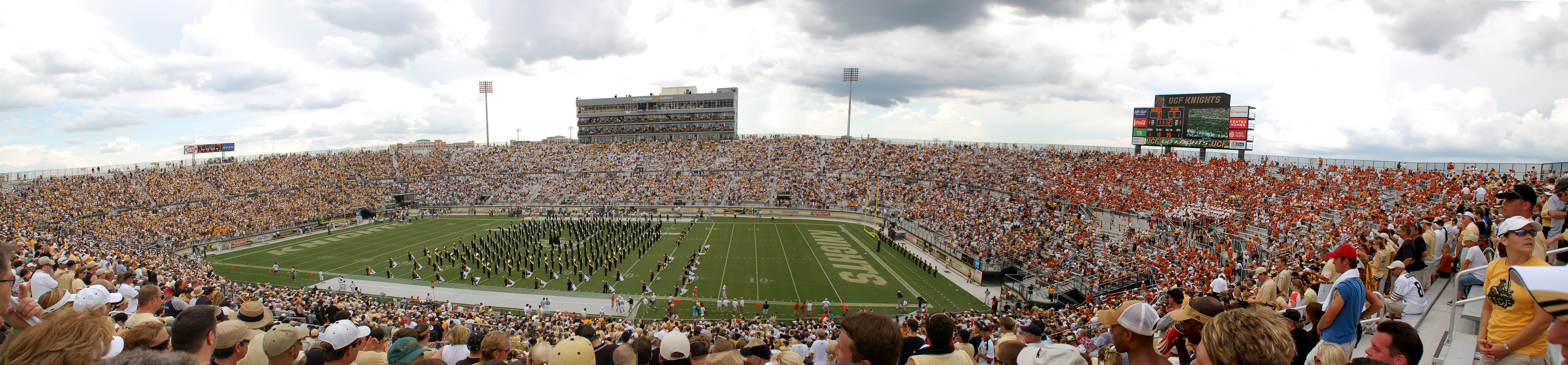
Panoramic view of Bright House Networks Stadium during its inaugural game in September 2007

=== Naming rights ===
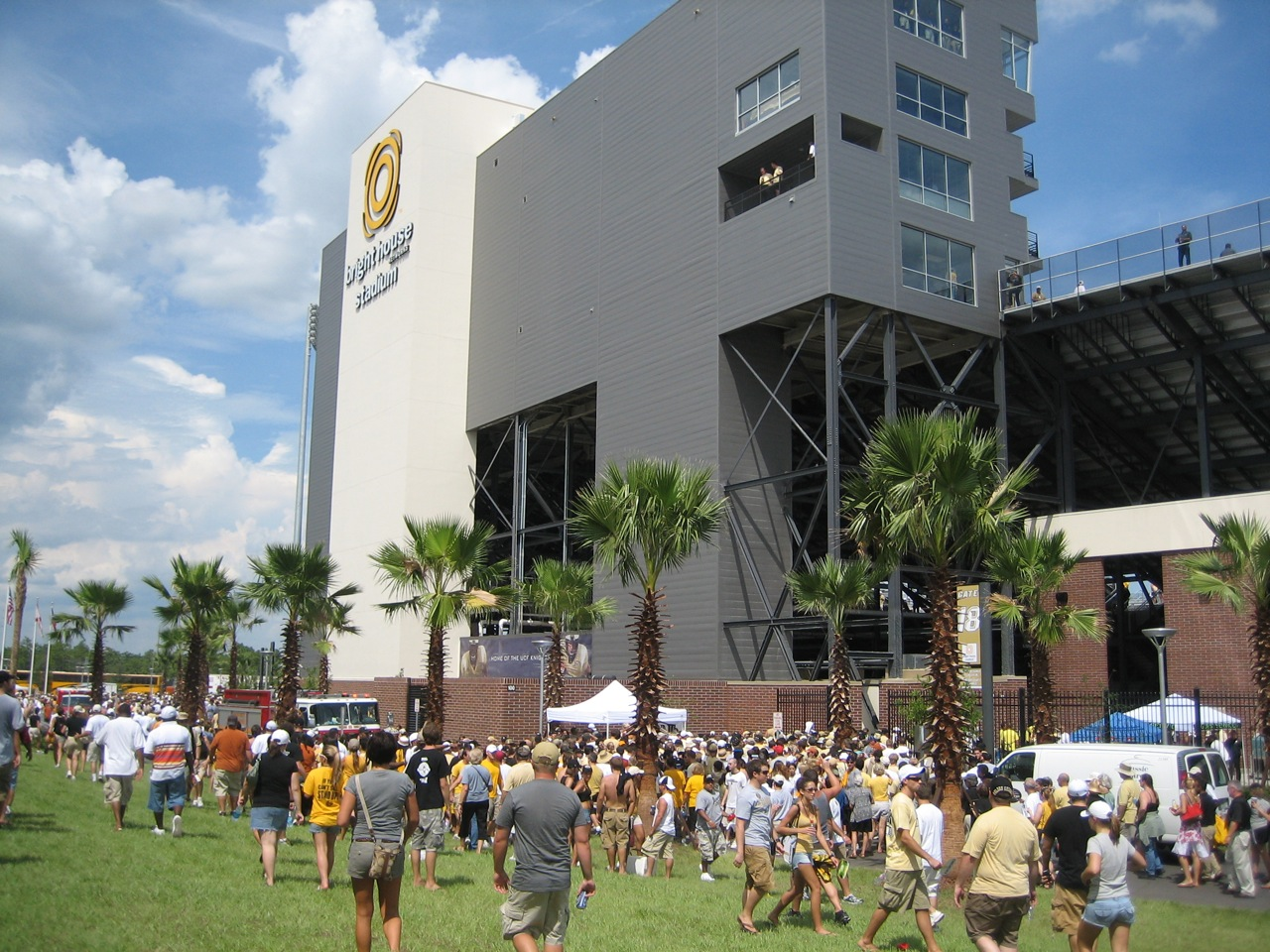
Exterior of the stadium on its opening day with Bright House Networks logo on the center (white) structure

During construction, the stadium's naming rights were sold to cable provider Bright House Networks, naming the facility Bright House Networks Stadium. In 2016, Bright House Networks was acquired by Charter Communications; in accordance with the company's use of Spectrum as a trade name for its cable services, the facility was renamed Spectrum Stadium in April 2017. This naming rights deal ended in 2020.

UCF next attempted to secure a new naming rights deal with RoofClaim.com, a roofing services company. In early 2020, a proposed 15-year, $35-million naming rights deal was drafted, but never finalized. The Florida Legislature put itself in position to hold approval authority for such sponsorships valued at over $1 million, while the state's insurance industry lobbied against the agreement due to RoofClaim's business practices. Political pressure terminated a similar naming rights deal the company had briefly secured with Florida Atlantic University for that school's basketball arena.

Anticipating being unable to secure a stadium naming rights deal, UCF Athletics announced on August 5, 2020, that the stadium would officially be named the "Bounce House" for the 2020 football season. Entering the 2021 football season, the stadium was still officially known by that name, while a potential naming rights deal with 3MG Roofing seemingly fell through. A deal was struck between UCF and FBC Mortgage on May 31, 2022, renaming the stadium to FBC Mortgage Stadium with a 10-year, $19.5 million contract. On June 12, 2025, in accordance with the rebranding of FBC Mortgage as Acrisure Mortgage, it was announced that the stadium would be renamed as Acrisure Bounce House effective July 1, 2025.

=== Nickname ===
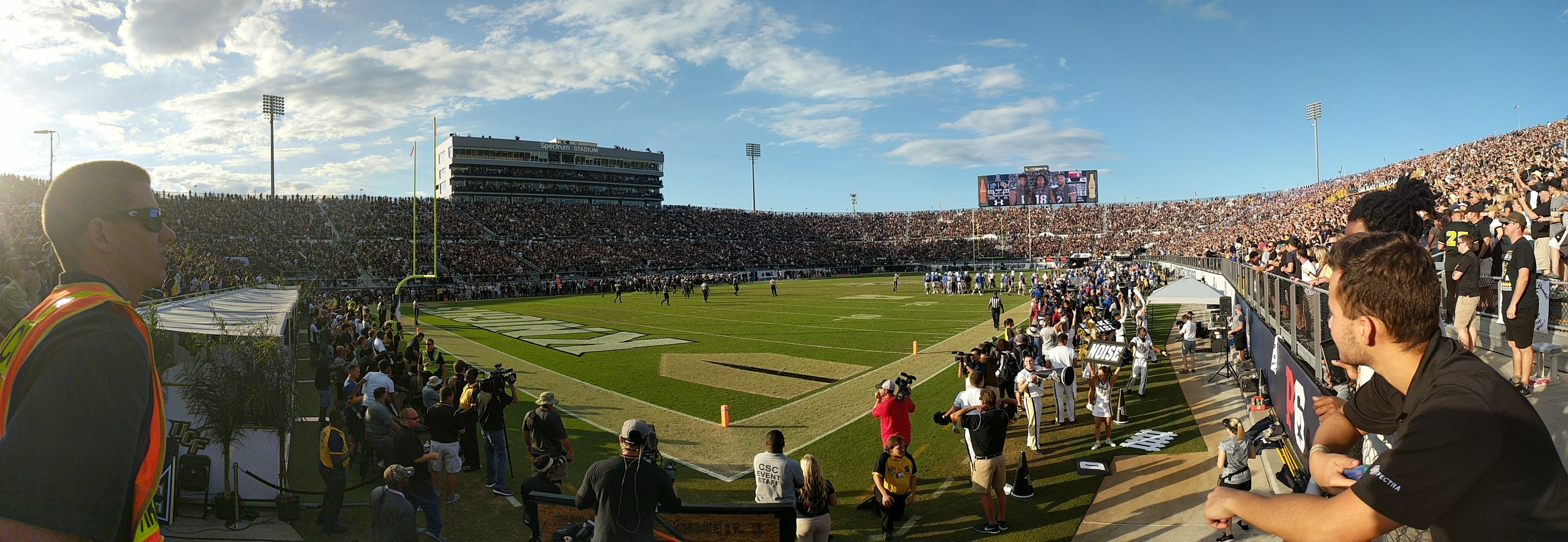
2017 AAC Championship

The stadium's nickname is the "Bounce House". The stadium vibrates and shakes when fans jump in unison, most notably when the song "Kernkraft 400" by Zombie Nation is played. The bouncing effect was noticed early on, and shortly after the stadium opened in 2007, some people started calling the facility "The Trampoline", a nickname that ultimately failed to gain traction. The more trendy nickname "Bounce House" soon became popular, very loosely derived from "Bright House [Networks Stadium]" (the official name at the time). For a brief time in 2020–2021, the stadium was officially named Bounce House, while the university was negotiating a new naming rights deal.

While many fans like the bouncing effect, some are uneasy with the bouncing. Stadium officials claimed the stadium was structurally sound, and an independent contractor confirmed that the bouncing would neither damage the stadium nor shorten its expected 50–year useful life. Still, a project was undertaken prior to the 2008 season to reinforce the stadium superstructure and mitigate the bouncing effect.

While the bouncing has been greatly reduced by the stadium reinforcements, it is still noticeable—sometimes enough to shake television cameras during games. For the 2010 Conference USA Football Championship Game, ESPN set up a camera position outside of the stadium to eliminate camera bounce caused by fans.

=== Drinking fountain controversy ===
The stadium was originally built without drinking fountains. The university argued that the building code used when the stadium was designed and approved did not require the installation of drinking fountains. However, this claim turned out to be incorrect because the 2004 Florida building code (in effect in 2005, when the UCF Board of Trustees approved the stadium design) mandated that stadiums and other public arenas must have one water fountain for every 1,000 seats, or half that number of fountains if water was also available for sale.

During the inaugural game against Texas, vendors ran out of water at halftime, leading to the hospitalization of 18 people for heat exhaustion. In order to correct the issue, UCF provided a free bottle of water to each person at the next game and immediately began work to install at least 50 drinking fountains throughout the stadium in order to comply with the 2004 building code requirement.

=== 2018–present ===
The short-lived Alliance of American Football (AAF) included the Orlando Apollos as one of its franchises with the Apollos playing at Spectrum Stadium during its inaugural 2019 season. The AAF folded in April 2019 with its first season incomplete; the University of Central Florida had failed to invoice the AAF for the lease of its stadium facilities or expenses for staff, leading media to speculate that UCF had lost more than $1 million of revenue from the deal.

Just over two weeks before the 2019 UCF football season opener, the UCF athletic department announced that the entire season-ticket allotment was sold out for the first time in school history. In addition, they created a formal waiting list for season tickets, also for the first time. In the press release, then-UCF athletic director Danny White teased a possible expansion of the stadium in the near future if ticket demand remains high.

The stadium has taken over as host of the Hula Bowl since 2022 due to Aloha Stadium being closed for renovations. It hosted the 2023 Cure Bowl.

Since 2014, UCF has completed five seasons undefeated at home at the stadium. They have hosted both College GameDay and Big Noon Kickoff. During the first few years of the stadium's use, under then-head coach George O'Leary, the Knights frequently wore gold home jerseys, with gold field markings prominent. This despite the team changing its nickname in 2007 from "Golden Knights" (1993–2006) back to simply "Knights" (1979–1992) as they moved into the new stadium. After O'Leary's departure, the Knights have largely eschewed gold jerseys in favor of various combinations of black and white home jerseys, with occasional gold accents.

Prior to the 2025 season, when stadium presenting sponsor FBC Mortgage announced its rebranding to Acrisure, it was announced that the stadium would be rebranded as Acrisure Bounce House, making "Bounce House" part of its official name for the first time since FBC Mortgage had acquired naming rights in 2022.

UCF Knights – Record at Acrisure Bounce House
Games	Wins	Losses	Pct.
All home games	94	34	.740
Night games (7 p.m. or later)	38	16	.704
Conference Championship games	4	0	1.000
Space Game	8	2	.800
Home opener	17	3	.850
Through November 15, 2026

== Expansion and upgrades ==
=== Renovations ===
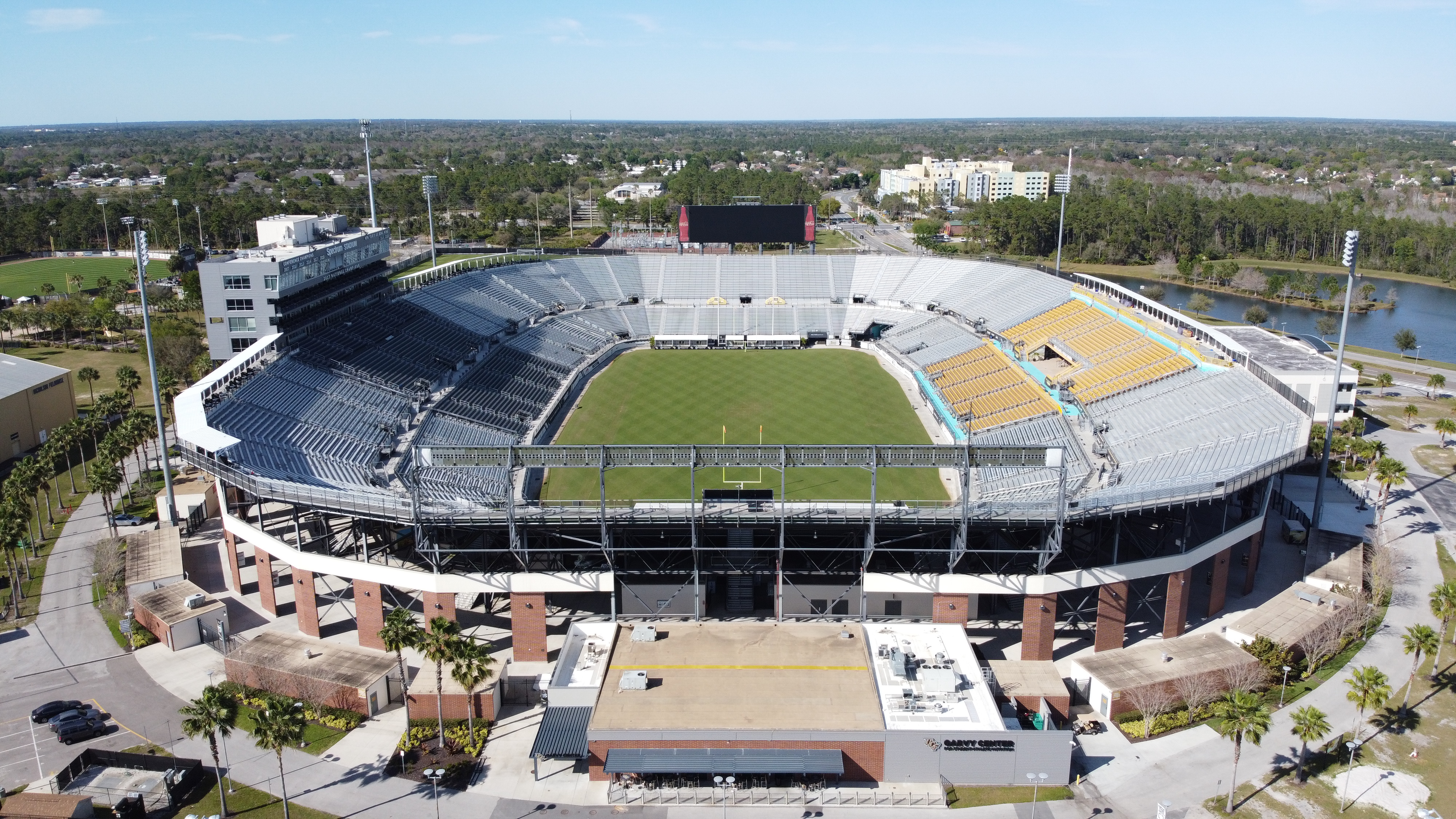
The post-renovation stadium in February 2020

The stadium was designed for a planned expansion to 65,000 seats with a third upper deck row. UCF planned to begin this effort by expanding the Roth Tower with more suites and club seating, and also adding an additional 10,000 seats in a third level on the east side of the stadium, increasing the stadium's capacity to 56,000.

The capacity for the 2015 season dropped by 1,117 seats when UCF removed seats on the east sidelines to construct the "Carl Black and Gold Cabana," which includes a bar, catered barbecue, and padded seats above the bar. In 2017, private field-level cabanas were erected in the south endzone, adjacent to the new J. & J. Rosengren Lounge. In 2018, additional field-level cabanas were added to the north endzone, as well as Loge cabana tables along the top rim of the grandstands.

In 2016, UCF removed its original scoreboard, located at the north end of the stadium, and replaced it with a full LED scoreboard measuring 114 by 36 feet (35 m × 11 m). One year later, UCF replaced the stadium's original auxiliary scoreboard, located at the south end of the stadium, and replaced it with a ribbon board that measures approximately 7 by 199 feet (2.1 m × 60.7 m).

In 2017, the university sued the architects and contractors that designed and constructed the stadium. Cited in the lawsuit were claims of "defects and deficiencies" which ostensibly led to "premature wear of the steel," as well as visible rust issues.

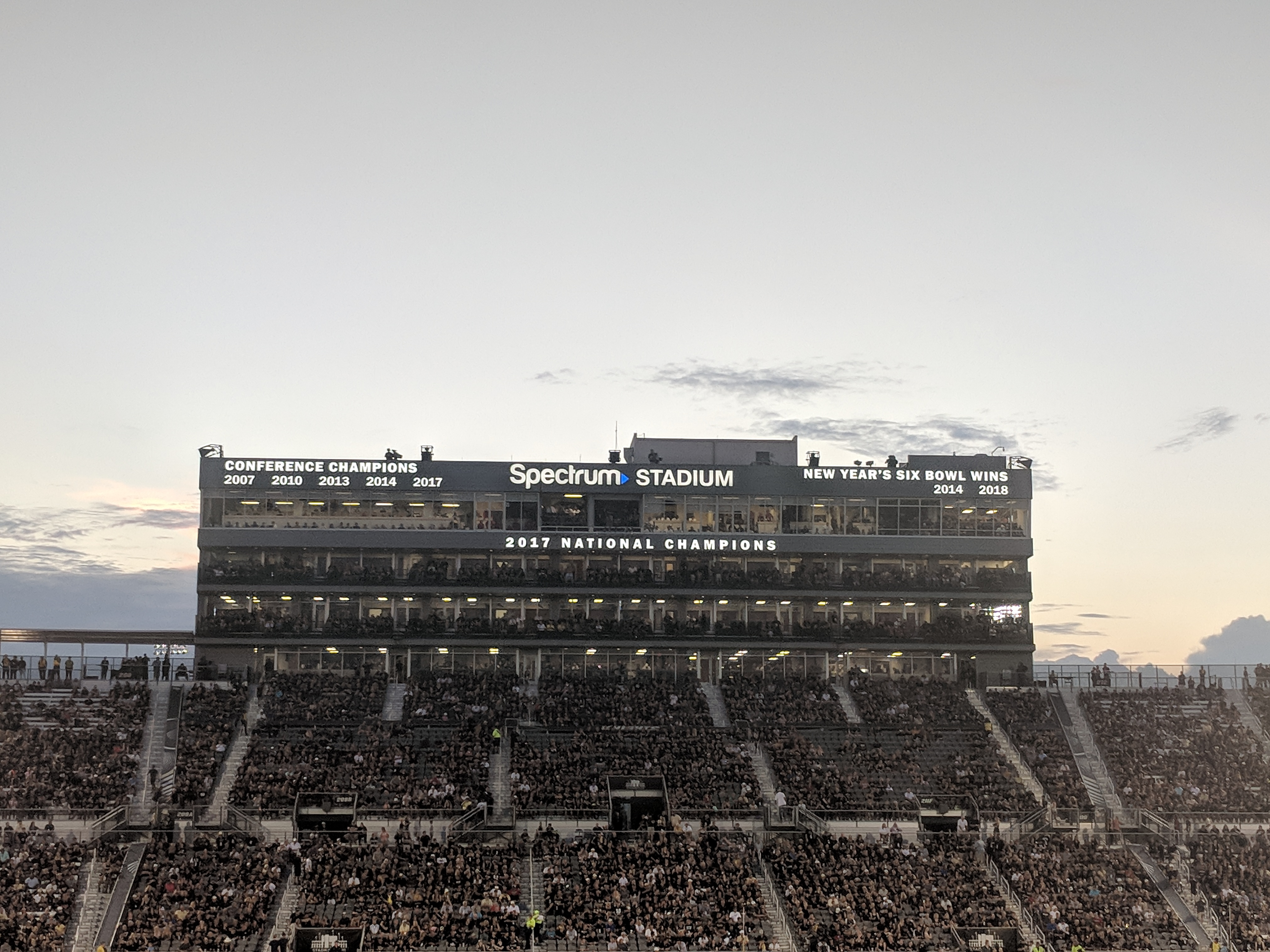
The then-Spectrum Stadium press box with "2017 National Champions" signage

At their spring game in 2018, UCF unveiled signage on Roth Tower to commemorate the football program's conference championships, New Year's Six/BCS bowl wins, and their National Championship for the 2017 season. (Note: Colley Matrix, a selector recognized by the NCAA, ranked UCF first for the 2017 FBS season; other recognized selectors ranked Alabama first.)

=== New Roth Tower expansion ===
On March 23, 2023 stadium renovations plans were revealed. The highlight of the $90 million project was a substantial expansion of Roth Tower. The tower's usable space was increased by approximately 2½ times. It features new suites, expanded existing suites, increased club seating capacity, and will provide new year-round useable space for gameday and non-gameday events. The press box was expanded and modernized. Radio and television broadcasting booths were upgraded and made larger, including the addition of a dedicated booth for the team's Spanish radio broadcast.

Work on the project began in December 2024. UCF played in the stadium during construction in 2025, with the original Roth Tower remaining mostly open during the 2025 season. Following the conclusion of the 2025 season, the new Roth Tower took shape, and construction was finished in August 2026.

== Attendance records ==
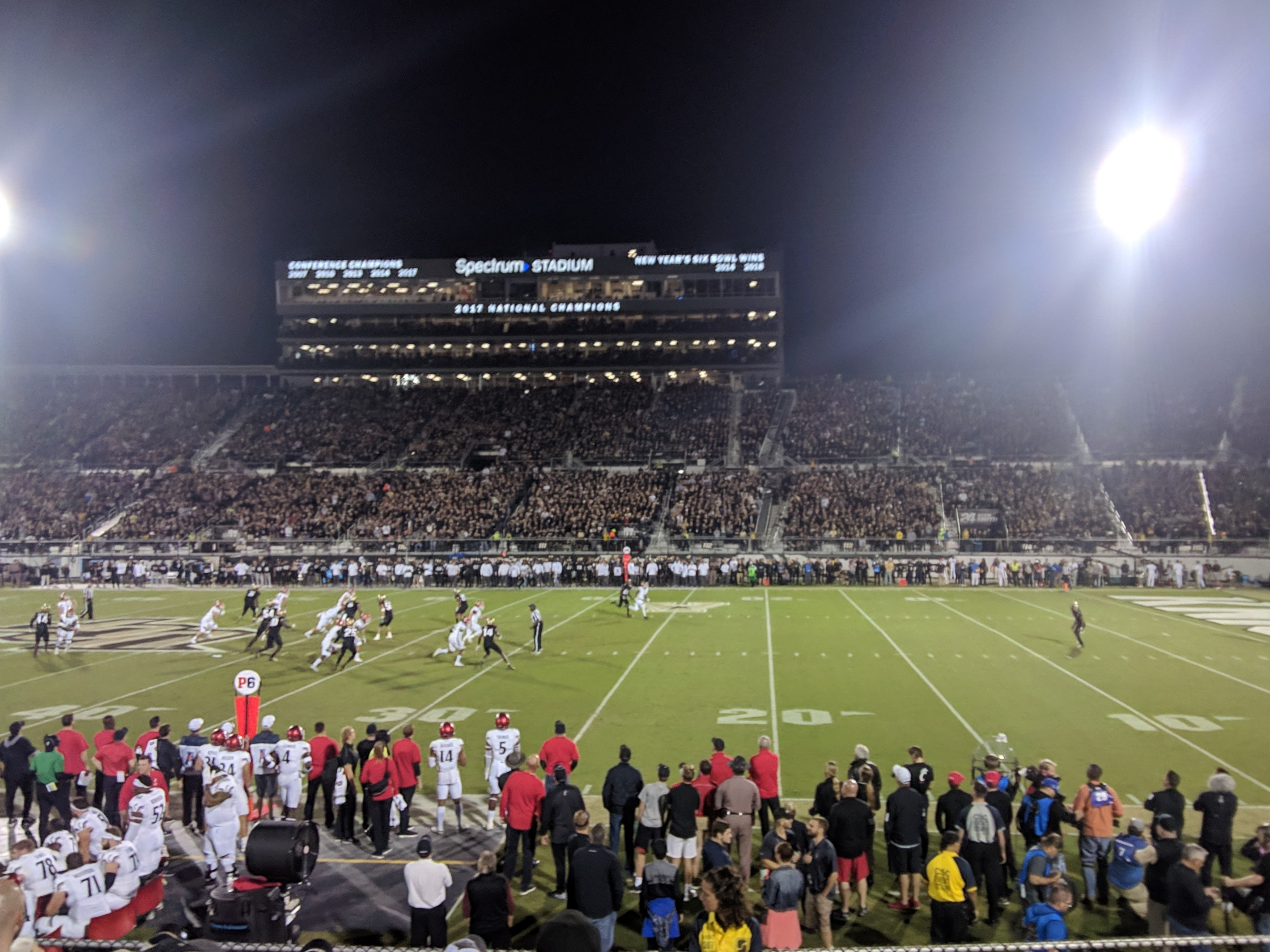
Cincinnati at UCF, ESPN College GameDay Prime Time

The highest attendance for games played at the Acrisure Bounce House against the Knights have included rival South Florida, Cincinnati, and Miami. The Knights largest home crowd at the Acrisure Bounce House occurred in stadium's third season (2009) against in-state foe Miami (48,543). That is in contrast with UCF's largest all-time home crowd (51,978), which occurred at the 2005 C-USA Championship, when the team was still playing downtown at the Citrus Bowl, and UCF's largest-ever game crowd (109,295) at Michigan in 2016. The smallest crowd (8,874) came in 2020 against Tulsa, during COVID-19 restrictions.

Rank	Attendance	Date	Game result	Notes
1	48,453	October 17, 2009	9 Miami 27, UCF 7	
2	47,795	November 17, 2018	11 UCF 38, 24 Cincinnati 13	Rivalry; College GameDay
3	47,605	September 28, 2013	12 South Carolina 28, UCF 25	
4	47,129	November 24, 2017	15 UCF 49, 22 South Florida 42	War on I-4
5	46,805	September 6, 2008	17 South Florida 31, UCF 24	War on I-4
6	46,103	November 3, 2007	UCF 47, Marshall 13	Homecoming
7	45,952	November 29, 2013	17 UCF 23, South Florida 20	War on I-4
8	45,906	October 31, 2026	Baylor 41, UCF 9	Space game
9	45,702	September 28, 2024	Colorado 48, UCF 21	Big Noon Kickoff
10	45,671	September 10, 2011	UCF 30, Boston College 3	

=== Postseason / bowl games ===
Rank	Attendance	Date	Game result	Notes
1	45,176	December 1, 2018	8 UCF 56, Memphis 41	AAC Championship Game
2	44,128	December 1, 2007	UCF 44, Tulsa 25	C-USA Championship Game
3	41,433	December 2, 2017	12 UCF 62, 16 Memphis 55 (2OT)	AAC Championship Game
4	41,045	December 4, 2010	UCF 17, SMU 7	C-USA Championship Game
5	11,121	December 16, 2023	Appalachian State 23, Miami 9	2023 Cure Bowl

== See also ==
- Greater Orlando
- History of the University of Central Florida
- List of NCAA Division I FBS football stadiums
- List of American football stadiums by capacity
- Lists of stadiums

== Notes ==
Events and tenants
Preceded by Citrus Bowl	Home of the MEAC/SWAC Challenge; 2014	Succeeded by Citrus Bowl
