= Lincoln Plaza at SunTrust Center =

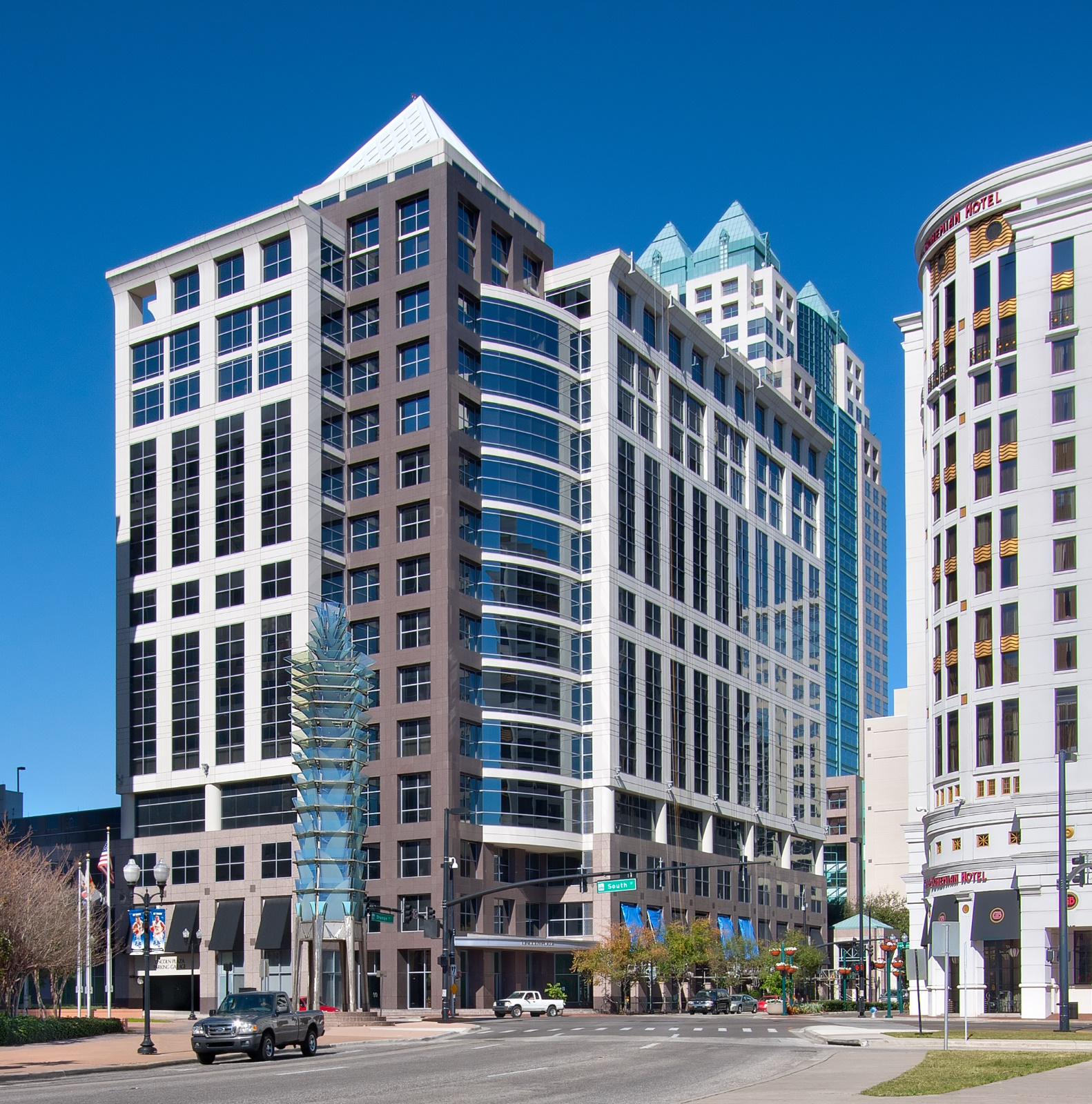
- Interactive map of the Lincoln Plaza at SunTrust Center area
- Alternative names: Lincoln Plaza

General information
- Architectural style: Postmodern
- Location: 300 South Orange Avenue; Orlando, Florida 32801, United States
- Coordinates: 28.538770°N 81.379384°W
- Current tenants: Ameriprise Financial Services; Morrison Commercial Real Estate; Public Financial Management; Rumberger, Kirk & Caldwell; Shutts & Bowen LLP
- Groundbreaking: April 1999
- Construction started: 1999
- Completed: 2000
- Cost: US$43 million
- Owner: Lincoln Property Company

Height
- Height: 227.49 ft (69.34 m)

Technical details
- Floor count: 16
- Floor area: 246,000 sq ft (22,900 m^{2})

Design and construction
- Architecture firm: Baker Barrios Architects, Inc.

Other information
- Parking: 625 spaces

Lincoln Plaza at SunTrust Center is a 16-story office building in downtown Orlando, Florida. The building was completed in 2000 at a cost of $43 million.

Construction on the building began in April 1999. A construction worker was killed in accident during construction of the building when a large piece of lumber fell from the eighth floor and struck him in the face.

The building attained a 45% occupancy rate shortly after completion, with lease rates of $26.50 per square foot.

In 2010, the building received LEED certification, the first for an existing building in Orlando.

== See also ==
- Dynetech Centre
- List of tallest buildings in Orlando
- Premiere Trade Plaza Office Tower II
- Premiere Trade Plaza Office Tower III
- Solaire at the Plaza
