= List of tallest buildings in Orlando =

Skyline of Orlando
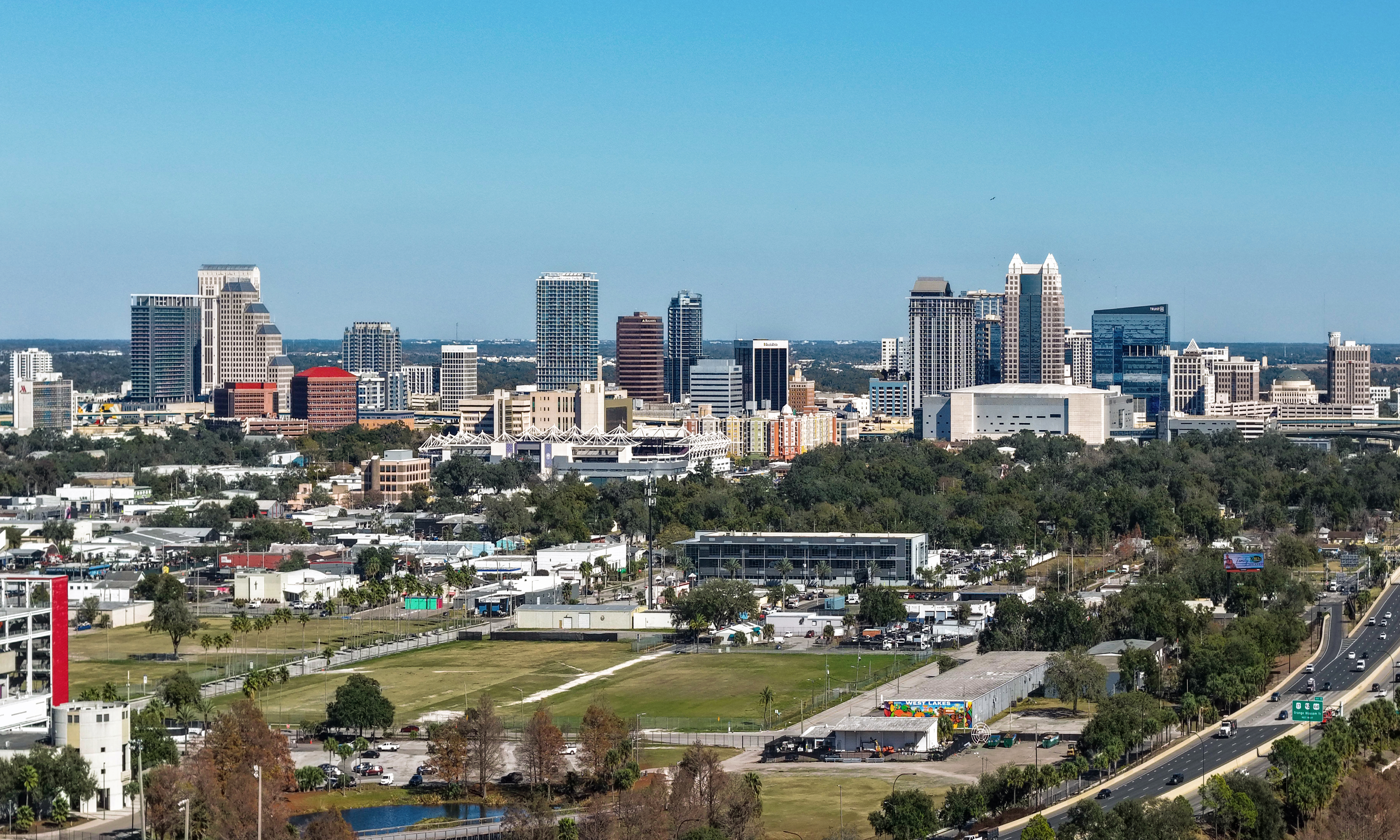
- Downtown Orlando in 2026
- Tallest building: 200 South Orange (1988)
- Tallest building height: 441 ft (134.4 m)

Number of tall buildings (2026)
- Taller than 75 m (246 ft): 24
- Taller than 100 m (328 ft): 9

Number of tall buildings — feet
- Taller than 200 ft (61.0 m): 35
- Taller than 300 ft (91.4 m): 12

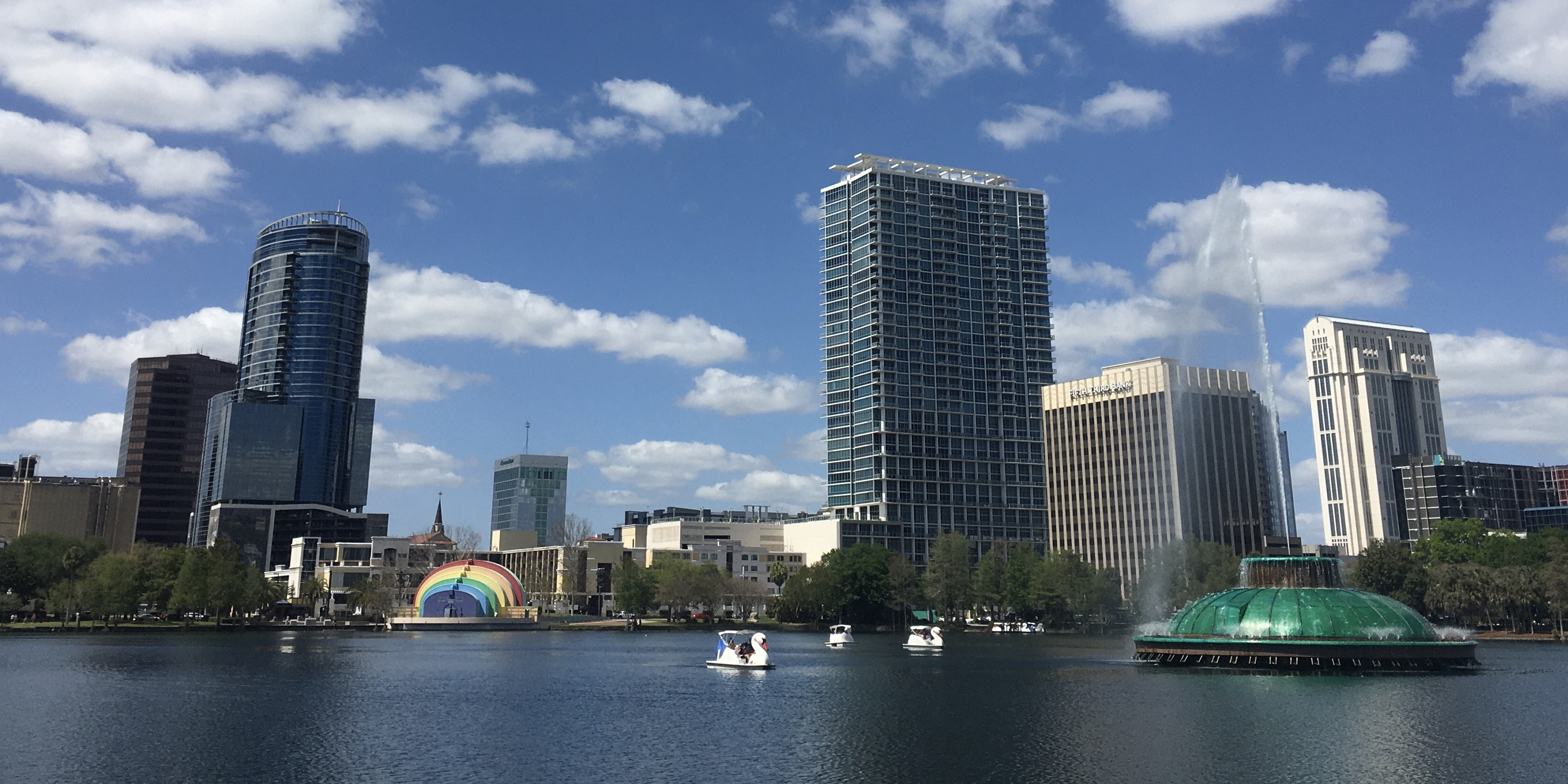
Orlando's skyline along Lake Eola in 2021

Orlando is a major city in the U.S. state of Florida, and its metropolitan area of Greater Orlando has over 2.9 million inhabitants. As of 2026, the city has 35 high-rise buildings that are taller than 200 feet (61 m), twelve of which have a height greater than 300 feet (91 m). The tallest building in the city of Orlando is 200 South Orange, formerly and still commonly known as the SunTrust Center. Completed in 1988, the 441 feet (134 m) tall building has 32 stories. Orlando's skyline ranks seventh in Florida in terms of 300-foot buildings, being the largest outside of the Miami and Tampa metropolitan areas. While it has the tallest inland skyline in the state, Orlando has a relatively short skyline for its population, having few 300-foot buildings per capita compared to other metropolitan areas of similar population.

The city's earliest high-rises, the Metcalf Building, State Bank Building and Angebilt Building, were built in the 1920s. No additional high-rises were built until the 1960s, after which more office and residential skyscrapers would be constructed downtown, and hotel towers elsewhere. The SunTrust Center has not been surpassed since its completion in 1988, and has remained the tallest building in Orlando for over 35 years. In the late 2000s, residential towers such as The VUE at Lake Eola and 55 West were added to downtown. The skyline has grown more slowly since then; after 2010, the tallest realized projects have been Society Orlando, a 28-story residential tower built in 2023, and Truist Plaza at Church Street, a mixed-use office and hotel tower.

The largest concentration of tall buildings in the city sits in Downtown Orlando, directly northeast of the intersection of Interstate 4 and Florida State Road 408. Lake Eola and its surrounding park are a major feature of the downtown cityscape, and is surrounded by high-rises on its west and south. Because of Downtown Orlando's close proximity to Orlando Executive Airport, there is a height limit of 450 ft (140 m) imposed there. Due to the city's tourism industry, primarily the Walt Disney World and Universal Orlando theme parks, a significant share of Orlando's high-rises, mostly hotels, are located far from downtown. This includes the city's second tallest building, the expansion to Hyatt Regency Orlando (formerly The Peabody Orlando), which is 428 ft (130 m) tall.

== History ==
Number of high-rise buildings by height in Orlando by the end of each year, based on the list below. Click on the legend to toggle a specific height on or off. View chart definition.

== Cityscape ==
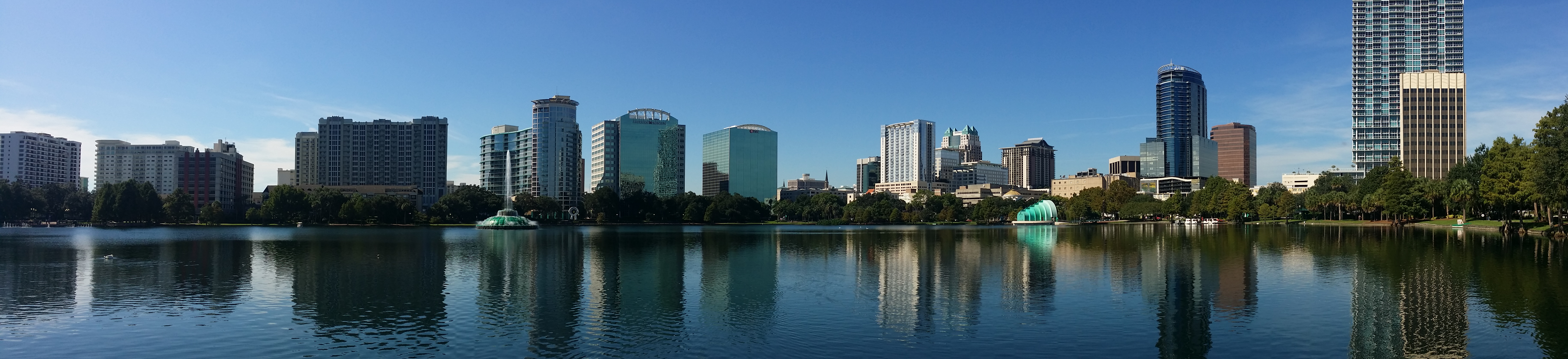
High-rise buildings around Lake Eola in 2015. Visible are the Capital Plaza buildings (center-left), the four green pyramids of 200 South Orange peaking out (center-right), the Aspire Building (right) and The VUE at Lake Eola (far right)

== Map of tallest buildings ==
The map below shows the location of buildings taller than 200 ft (61 m) in Downtown Orlando, where the majority of the city's tallest buildings are. Each marker is numbered by the building's height rank, and colored by the decade of its completion.

Buildings taller than 200 ft (61 m) in Downtown Orlando. An asterisk (*) next to the building's name indicates it is located outside the map.
- 1960s
- 1970s
- 1980s
- 1990s
- 2000s
- 2010s
- 2020s
1 200 South Orange
2 Hyatt Regency Orlando Expansion Tower*
3 The VUE at Lake Eola
4 Orange County Courthouse
5 Bank of America Center
6 55 West
7 Solaire at the Plaza
8 Aspire Building
9 Society Orlando
10 Truist Plaza at Church Street
11 JW Marriott Orlando Grande Lakes*
12 Hyatt Regency Orlando*
13 Marriott's Orlando World Center West Tower*
14 Citrus Center
15 Premiere Trade Plaza Office Tower II
16 The Waverly on Lake Eola
17 Citi Tower
18 Ginsburg Tower*
19 One Eleven North Orange
20 Four Points by Sheraton Orlando International Drive*
21 SkyHouse Orlando
22 Rosen Centre Hotel*
23 One Orlando Centre*
24 City Center I
25 Blue Heron Beach Resort II*
26 Mondrian on Lake Eola
27 Lincoln Plaza at SunTrust Center
28 Capital Plaza II
29 20 North Orange Avenue
30 Gateway Center*
31 Universal Adventura Hotel*
32 Capital Plaza I
33 Star Tower
34 201 South Orange
35 Seacoast Bank Building

== Tallest buildings ==
This list ranks completed skyscrapers and high-rises in Orlando that stand at least 200 ft (61 m) tall as of 2026, based on standard height measurement. This includes spires and architectural details but does not include antenna masts. The “Year” column indicates the year of completion. Buildings tied in height are sorted by year of completion, and then alphabetically. Free-standing structures are included for comparison purposes.

Was the tallest building in Orlando upon completion

Rank	Name	Image	Location	Height ft (m)	Floors	Year	Purpose	Notes
N/A	Orlando StarFlyer		28°26′41″N 81°28′13″W	450 (137)	N/A	2018	Ride	Located at Vue at 360. Tallest free-standing structure in Orlando Not a habitable building; included for comparison purposes.
1	200 South Orange		28°32′24″N 81°22′47″W	441 (134.4)	30	1988	Office	Tallest building completed in Orlando in the 1980s. Tallest building in Florida outside of the Miami, Tampa, and Jacksonville metropolitan areas. Formerly known as the SunTrust Center or Sun Bank Center until 2019, when SunTrust moved out of the building.
2	Hyatt Regency Orlando Expansion Tower		28°25′41″N 81°28′07″W	428 (130.4)	31	2010	Hotel	Tallest building completed in Orlando in the 2010s. Tallest hotel building in Orlando. Tallest building located outside of downtown. Formerly known as The Peabody Orlando Expansion Tower until 2013.
3	The VUE at Lake Eola		28°32′43″N 81°22′34″W	428 (130.4)	35	2007	Residential	Tallest building completed in Orlando in the 2000s. Tallest residential building in Orlando.
4	Orange County Courthouse		28°32′54″N 81°22′39″W	416 (126.8)	24	1997	Government	The county courthouse of Orange County, of which Orlando is the county seat. Tallest government building in Orlando.
5	Bank of America Center		28°32′49″N 81°22′47″W	404 (123.1)	28	1988	Office	Sold in January 2018 to Southwest Value Partners.
N/A	Orlando Eye		28°26′36″N 81°28′06″W	400 (122)	N/A	2015	Ride	A ferris wheel located at Icon Park. Not a habitable building; included for comparison purposes.
N/A	SeaWorld SkyTower		28°24′37″N 81°27′41″W	400 (122)	N/A	1973	Observation	Part of SeaWorld Orlando. Not a habitable building; included for comparison purposes.
6	55 West		28°32′27″N 81°22′49″W	377 (114.9)	32	2008	Residential	Also called 55 West on the Esplanade.
7	Solaire at the Plaza		28°32′27″N 81°22′40″W	357 (108.8)	30	2006	Residential	
8	Aspire Building		28°32′38″N 81°22′37″W	356 (108.5)	31	2008	Mixed-use	Formerly known as Dynetech Center until 2013. Also known as the One Eleven Building. Mixed-use office and residential building.
N/A	Orlando International Airport Control Tower		28°25′38″N 81°18′28″W	346 (105)	N/A	2002	Transport	Not a habitable building; included for comparison purposes.
9	Society Orlando		28°32′52″N 81°22′47″W	330 (101)	28	2023	Residential	Tallest building completed in Orlando in the 2020s.
10	Truist Plaza at Church Street		28°32′20″N 81°22′52″W	317 (97) (Note: Sources do not state the exact height of this building. This figure was determined using Google Earth by subtracting the altitude of the building's lowest main pedestrian open-air entrance from the highest architectural point.)	28	2020	Mixed-use	Mixed-use office and hotel building. Part of two tower development called Church Street Plaza.
11	JW Marriott Orlando Grande Lakes		28°24′06″N 81°25′43″W	306 (93)	26	2003	Hotel	
12	Hyatt Regency Orlando		28°25′38″N 81°28′04″W	303 (92.4)	28	1986	Hotel	Formerly The Peabody Orlando until 2013. Tallest building in Orlando for a brief period of two years, from 1986 to 1988.
13	Marriott's Orlando World Center West Tower		28°21′39″N 81°30′38″W	285 (87)	28	1986	Hotel	
14	Citrus Center		28°32′22″N 81°22′43″W	281 (85.6)	19	1971	Office	Tallest building in Orlando from 1971 to 1986.
15	Premiere Trade Plaza Office Tower II		28°32′26″N 81°22′43″W	277 (84.3)	16	2007	Office	Shares a base with Solaire at the Plaza.
16	The Waverly on Lake Eola		28°32′30″N 81°22′24″W	275 (83.8)	21	2001	Residential	
17	Citi Tower		28°32′27″N 81°22′22″W	275 (83.8)	24	2017	Residential	Tallest building completed in downtown in the 2010s. Contains retail units.
18	Ginsburg Tower		28°34′26″N 81°22′11″W	274 (83.5)	15	2008	Hospital	Part of the AdventHealth Orlando campus, formerly the Florida Hospital until 2019.
19	One Eleven North Orange		28°32′38″N 81°22′44″W	267 (81.5) (Note: Height is an estimate according to the source.)	21	1986	Office	Also known as Regions Bank Tower and the AmSouth Building.
20	Four Points by Sheraton Orlando International Drive		28°27′47″N 81°27′41″W	263 (80)	21	1974	Hotel	
21	SkyHouse Orlando		28°32′49″N 81°22′37″W	262 (80)	23	2013	Residential	
22	Rosen Centre Hotel		28°25′28″N 81°27′51″W	255 (78)	24	1995	Hotel	
23	One Orlando Centre		28°33′20″N 81°22′39″W	254 (77)	19	1987	Office	
24	City Center I		28°32′14″N 81°22′45″W	250 (76.2)	14	1999	Office	Part of the CNL Center City Commons complex.
25	Blue Heron Beach Resort II	–	28°22′06″N 81°30′03″W	240 (73.2)	22	2007	Hotel	
26	Mondrian on Lake Eola		28°32′30″N 81°22′35″W	240 (73)	22	2018	Residential	
27	Lincoln Plaza at SunTrust Center		28°32′20″N 81°22′46″W	239 (73)	15	2000	Office	
28	Capital Plaza II		28°32′30″N 81°22′27″W	230 (70)	15	1999	Office	Part of the Capital Plaza complex.
29	20 North Orange Avenue		28°32′33″N 81°22′46″W	228 (69)	16	1983	Office	Formerly known as Wachovia Tower.
30	Gateway Center		28°33′32″N 81°22′47″W	219 (67)	16	1989	Office	
31	Universal Adventura Hotel	–	28°27′55″N 81°28′16″W	218 (66.5)	16	2018	Hotel	
32	Capital Plaza I		28°32′30″N 81°22′29″W	218 (66)	15	1975	Office	Part of the Capital Plaza complex. The taller Capital Plaza II was built 14 years later in 1999.
33	Star Tower		28°32′22″N 81°22′18″W	218 (66)	16	2007	Residential	
34	201 South Orange		28°32′24″N 81°22′41″W	207 (63.1)	15	1982	Office	Formerly known as Signature Plaza
35	Seacoast Bank Building		28°32′43″N 81°22′46″W	205 (62.5)	14	1967	Office	Tallest building in Orlando from 1967 to 1971. Also known as the First Green Bank Building, Southern Community Bank Building, or Old Southern Bank building.

== Tallest under construction or proposed ==
=== Under construction ===
Since the completion of Society Orlando in 2023, there have been no buildings under construction in Orlando that are planned to be taller than 200 feet (61 m).

=== Approved ===
The following table ranks approved and proposed skyscrapers in Orlando that are expected to be at least 200 ft (61 m) tall as of 2026, based on standard height measurement. The “Year” column indicates the expected year of completion. Table entries with dashes (—) indicate that information regarding building heights, floor counts, or dates of completion has not yet been released.

Name	Height ft (m)	Floors	Year (est.)	Purpose	Status	Notes
Zoi House	467 (142)	41	–	Residential	Approved	Proposed in September 2018. Approved in November 2018 by MPB, height approved by FAA. Development never began, property sold to new developer who promised to build something similar.
The Edge (Church Street Plaza Tower 2)	400 (122)	32	–	Mixed-use	Approved	Part of the two-tower development known as Church Street Plaza. The first tower was completed in 2019. It will be a mixed-use office and residential building.
110 W. Jefferson	391 (119)	37	–	Residential	Proposed	Residential. Proposed August 2022.
Modera South Eola	262 (80)	25	–	Residential	Proposed	Residential. Proposed in October 2022, along with an adjacent office building, to replace a parking lot.
924 N. Magnolia	220 (67)	20	–	Residential	Proposed	Residential. Proposed in 2022 as a two-parcel development.
Orlando Magic Entertainment Complex Tower 1	—	25	–	Hotel	Approved	
Orlando Magic Entertainment Complex Tower 2	—	20	–	Residential	Approved	
Society Phase 2	—	17	–	Residential	Approved	

== Timeline of tallest buildings ==
Name	Image	Years as tallest	Height ft (m)	Floors	Notes
Seacoast Bank Building		1967–1971	205 (62)	14	
Citrus Center		1971–1986	281 (86)	19	
Hyatt Regency Orlando		1986–1988	303 (92)	28	
200 South Orange		1988–present	441 (134)	30	

== See also ==
- ICON Orlando
- List of tallest buildings in Florida
- List of tallest buildings in Fort Lauderdale
- List of tallest buildings in Jacksonville
- List of tallest buildings in Miami
- List of tallest buildings in Miami Beach
- List of tallest buildings in St. Petersburg
- List of tallest buildings in Sunny Isles Beach
- List of tallest buildings in Tampa
