= Premiere Trade Plaza Office Tower III =

- Interactive map of the Premiere Trade Plaza Office Tower III area

General information
- Location: 101 South Orange Avenue; Orlando, Florida 32801, United States
- Coordinates: 28.540805°N 81.378591°W
- Construction started: 2004
- Completed: 2006
- Opened: 2006

Height
- Height: 195.67 ft (59.64 m)

Technical details
- Floor count: 13
- Lifts/elevators: 6

Design and construction
- Architecture firm: Baker Barrios Architects, Inc.

Premiere Trade Plaza Tower III is a 13-story office building in downtown Orlando, Florida. The building was completed in 2006 as part of a three building complex known as Premier Trade Plaza.

In 2007, developer Cameron Khun announced that the presumptive anchor tenant had decided against buying 60,000 square feet of office condominium space in the plaza, thus not permitting them to retain the naming rights for the buildings. The naming rights for the plaza and the two office towers cost $300,000 per year.

== See also ==
- Dynetech Centre
- List of tallest buildings in Orlando
- Premiere Trade Plaza Office Tower II
- Solaire at the Plaza
