= Downtown Orlando =

Area of Orlando in Florida, US

- Neighborhood
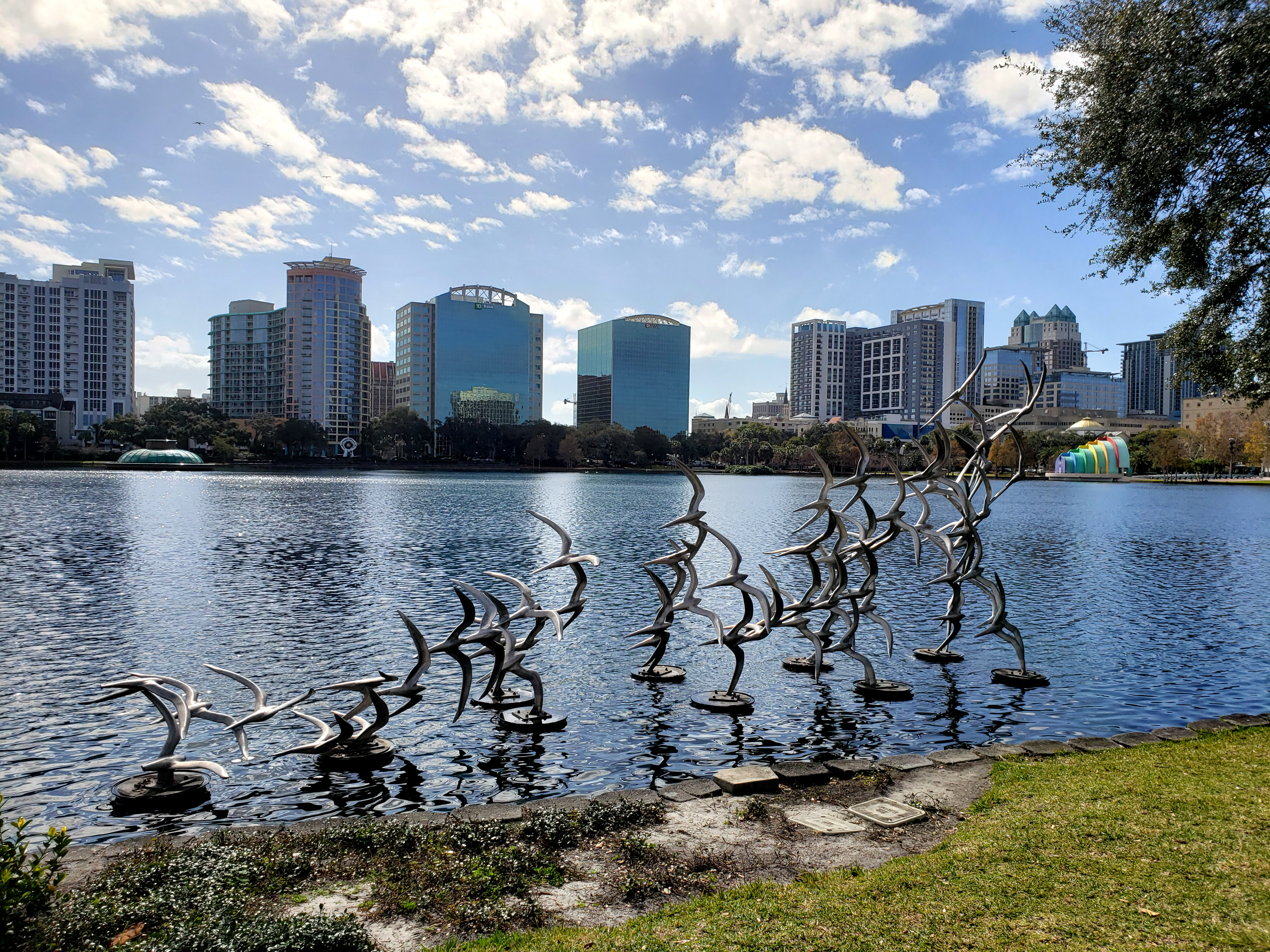
- Downtown Orlando skyline as seen from Lake Eola facing west
- Nicknames: Downtown, Central Business District
- Interactive map of Downtown Orlando
- Coordinates: 28°32′1″N 81°22′33″W
- Country: United States
- State: Florida
- County: Orange County
- City: Orlando
- Settled: July 31, 1875
- Subdistricts of Downtown: Neighborhoods list: North Quarter; Eola Heights; Thornton Park; South Eola District; Lake Cherokee Historic District; Holden/Parramore; Central Business District

Population (2010)
  - Total: 18,731 (Includes all Downtown neighborhoods)
  - Density: 5,123/sq mi (1,978/km^{2})
- Demonym: Downtowner
- Time zone: UTC-05 (EST)
- Website: www.downtownorlando.com

Downtown Orlando is the historic core and central business district of Orlando, Florida, United States. It is bordered by Marks Street in the north, Mills Avenue (SR 15) in the east, Orange Blossom Trail (US 441) in the west, and Kaley Avenue in the south. There are several distinct neighborhoods in downtown; "North Quarter" to the north, "Lake Eola Heights Historic District" just north of Lake Eola, "South Eola" contains Lake Eola Park and continues to the east and south of Lake Eola, "Thornton Park" in the east, "Parramore" in the west, "Lake Cherokee Historic District" to the south, and the "Central Business District" (or the "Financial District") between Colonial Drive and Lake Lucerne in the center. In 2010, the estimated population of downtown was 18,731. The daytime population was estimated to be 65,000 (in 2010). The 5-mile radius population of downtown is 273,335.

== Overview ==
Downtown Orlando is the largest of urban centers in Central Florida. It is home to residential and commercial towers; local, state, and federal government offices; sports facilities; performing arts theaters; art galleries; retail; restaurants; nightclubs; and parks. Downtown is removed from the tourist areas located in the southwestern half of the city, but it draws visitors seeking to experience the "Real Orlando". It is also the location of numerous festivals, parades, concerts, political demonstrations, and other high-profile events.

== Geography ==
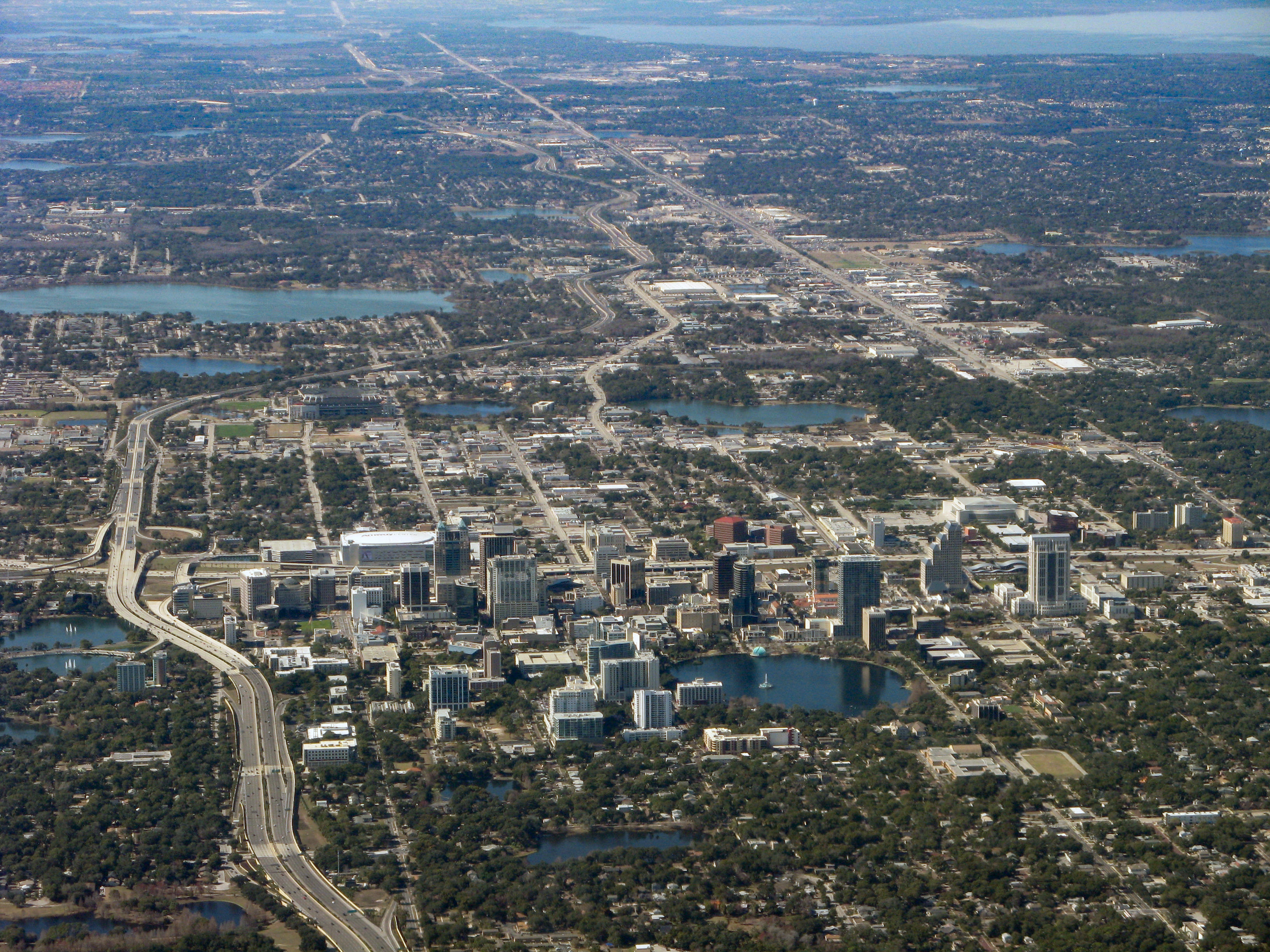
View of Downtown Orlando (center) and periphery to Lake Apopka (upper-right); January 2011

There are seven official neighborhoods with significant portions inside the Downtown Orlando Community Redevelopment Area (CRA):

- Callahan (portion east of Westmoreland Drive)
- Central Business District
- Holden/Parramore (portion east of Westmoreland Drive)
- Lake Dot (portion east of Westmoreland Drive)
- Lake Eola Heights (portion west of Summerlin Avenue)
- South Eola
- North Quarter
- City District

The CRA also includes small pieces of College Park (portions east of Peachtree Road, and along Orange Avenue between Magnolia and Highland Avenues), Lake Cherokee (portions west of Delaney Avenue and north of Ponce de Leon Place / Palmer Street), Lorna Doone (Camping World Stadium only), Park Lake/Highland (portion north of Lake Highland), South Division (portion north of Gore Street, mostly highway right-of-way), South Orange (portion north of Gore Street), and Thornton Park (portion north of Central Boulevard and west of James Avenue).

=== North Quarter ===
Located north of Colonial Drive, the border of this area is Interstate 4 to the west, and Highland Avenue to the east, the north border is N Orange Ave & the I-4 on-ramps at Lake Ivanhoe. The high amount of apartments and condominiums bring a diverse collection of dining and shopping to the area. It is one of the more affordable neighbourhoods in the downtown area, with many artists including members of the Orlando Ballet and Orlando Opera making their home here. Diverse Word, the oldest open mic night in Orlando, is held at Downtown Credo North Quarter on Tuesday nights.

=== Parramore ===
Established in the 1880s, Parramore is the historical hub of Orlando's African-American community. The area is located just west of the Central Business district along Division Ave and West Church Street. Now considered an economically depressed area, Orlando leaders are working with business owners in the community to improve the area's reputation. While some parts of the neighborhood have been gentrified, Parramore still maintains its historical African-American identity.

It is a residential area with a large number of high-intensity entertainment and office institutions; such as the Kia Center, Bob Carr Performing Arts Centre, US Courthouse for the Mid-District of Florida, Florida A&M University School of Law, county & state buildings, and Orlando Police Department headquarters. Smaller businesses include grocery stores, barber shops, and soul food restaurants.

Orlando officially considers Parramore to be three separate neighborhoods: Lake Dot (between Colonial Drive and Amelia Street), Callahan (between Amelia Street and Central Boulevard), and Holden/Parramore (between Central Boulevard and Gore Street). All three are bounded on the east by Interstate 4 and on the west by Orange Blossom Trail.

=== Central Business District ===
The central business district is Orlando's Financial District and is the most recognized feature of downtown. The majority of Orlando's night clubs are also in this area. Located here are corporate offices for banks Wells Fargo, Seacoast, FifthThird Bank, and Suntrust banks, tech companies, restaurants, Orlando City Hall, foreign consulates, and many hotels. SunTrust Center and City Commons are two large office complexes within the CBD. Church Street Station is also located in this area. Many of Orlando's historic buildings are located within the CBD standing next to modern skyscrapers. The Rogers Building (built in 1886), originally an English Gentlemen's Club built in the Queen Anne style, is the oldest building in downtown Orlando and now is home the Downtown Art's District.

The Downtown Arts District provides funding support, manages and operates CityArts—a multi-use arts and cultural destination where visual and performing arts co-exist inside the Roger's Building. Visited by more than 100,000 people annually, CityArts showcases an infusion of local and international works of art, and is home to six independently operated art galleries as well as art collective, Red Tape.

In addition to the plethora of bars and corporate offices, the district hosts several prominent theaters including the Mad Cow Theater and Dr. Phillips Center for the Performing Arts, home to Steimetz Hall, one of the world's most acoustically perfect halls, designed to achieve an N1 sound rating.

Orlando City Council on March 20, 2023, approved an ordinance to establish a permit for alcohol service after midnight in a district called the downtown entertainment area. The ordinance included a requirement to hire extra-duty police officers to patrol the central business district's entertainment area, depending on the size of a venue, on Fridays-Sundays from 10:30 p.m. to 3:30 a.m. The ordinance took effect May 1, 2023. On September 13, 2024, three downtown businesses filed a federal lawsuit against the city of Orlando and Orlando Police Chief Eric Smith, challenging the city’s after midnight alcohol sales land-use permit ordinance. The businesses alleged that the ordinance is an unconstitutional financial burden, claiming the mandated extra-duty police officers costs them an annual $591,120 combined while other permit holders were not required to pay.

Many major events take place in the Central Business District throughout the year. Creative City Project hosts the annual Immerse Arts Festival, an annual performing and interactive arts event. The festival takes place across 10 city blocks in Downtown Orlando every October. In November, the area outside of City Hall hosts FusionFest. The festival is sponsored by the Downtown Arts District and support from Orange County Government, the Orlando Downtown Development Board, the Dr. Phillips Center, and a growing grassroots movement.

=== South Eola and Lake Eola ===
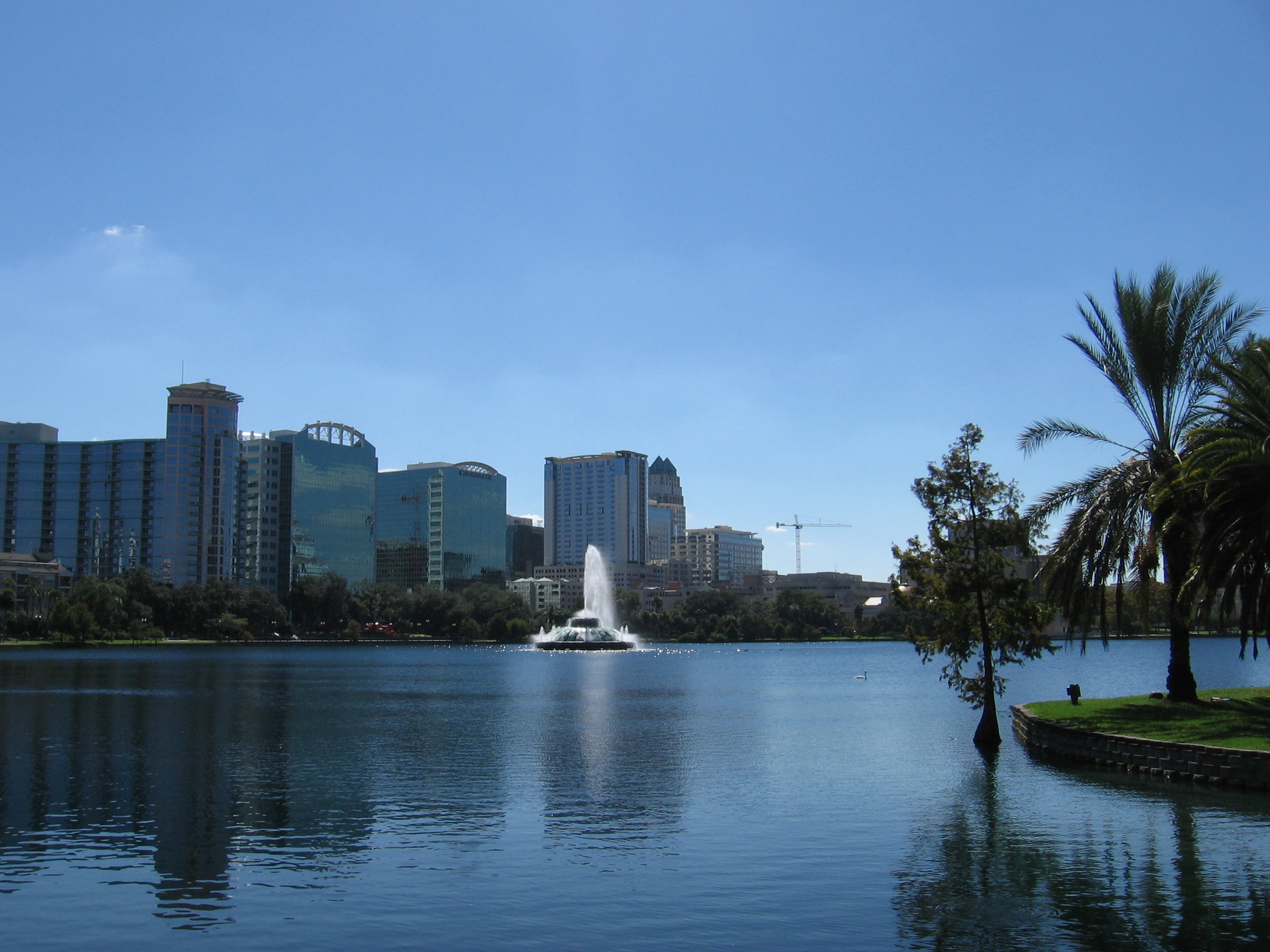
Lake Eola

Lake Eola Park is located in South Eola, east of the CBD. The park is bordered by the Lake Eola Heights neighborhood north of the lake, South Eola Heights to the south and Thornton Park on the eastern side of the lake. The park is historically significant and is a frequent venue for events and festivals. The park's most iconic landmark is the Linton E. Allen Memorial Fountain (locally known as the Lake Eola Fountain), permanently embedded to the bottom with concrete beams in the center of the lake. The fountain is illuminated nightly in various colors with two nightly water shows. In addition to the fountain, the park features swan boat rentals and the Walt Disney Amphitheater. Every Independence Day, the park is host to a large fireworks display which draws thousands of people to downtown. A 0.85-mile (1.37 km) recreational pathway circles the park and leads to a playground.

Lake Eola Heights is unique in Orlando as it contains some of the oldest homes in the city and is one of Orlando's historic districts. There are many historical "Florida style" bungalows and century-old oak lined brick streets.

=== Thornton Park ===
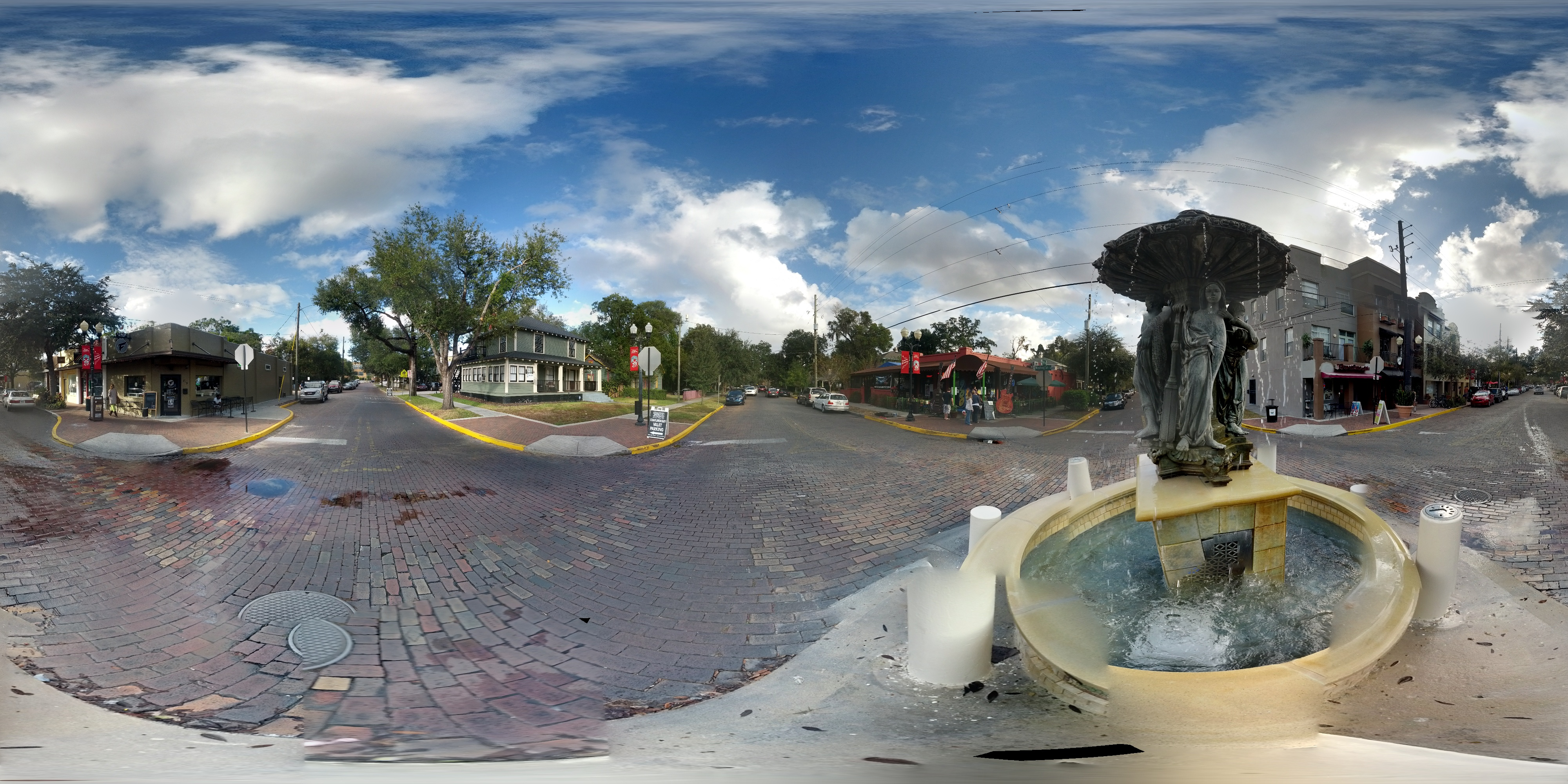
Facing east from the corner of Washington St and Hyer Ave in the heart of Thornton Park.

Thornton Park is located one city block east of Lake Eola Park. The streets creating its border are: Summerlin Ave, E Robinson St, N Brown Ave, E Central Blvd to S Hyer Ave, and S Hyer Ave south to Florida State Road 408. The area is similar to the Lake Eola Heights neighborhood in that it contains historic homes and the streets are paved with bricks, although it is roughly half the size. Thornton Park also enjoys a handful of small restaurants, bars and boutiques along E Washington St. The neighborhood also has a small fountain located in the center of the intersection of E Washington St & N Hyer Ave which has become a focal point, and is described here: The Fountain is a replica of a fountain found in a Paris city center that is 25 times its size. In 1999 the "Taste of Thornton Park Event" was organized specifically to raise enough money to purchase the Thornton Park Fountain for around $17,000 + $23,000 for fountain foundation. Howard Middle School, which was the original Orlando High School, is located here.

== History ==
=== Early years ===
Prior to the arrival of European settlers in 1837, the Orlando area was occupied by the Native American Creek and Seminole tribes. In 1838, Fort Gatlin was built a few miles south of downtown Orlando on the shores of modern-day Lake Gatlin; (a historic marker is now located on the fort site). In 1850, a man named Aaron Jernigan built a post office north of the fort and the area became known as "Jernigan". In 1856, Jernigan was relieved of his command of the post office due to "notorious acts" and the area was renamed "Orlando". The village remained little more than a backwater during and after the Civil War until 1875 when The "Town of Orlando" was incorporated. It was centered around the original Orange County Courthouse in between today's Court Avenue and Magnolia Avenue (originally named "Main Street").

A fire in 1884 almost destroyed the entire town. Before the fire, most of the structures in Orlando were built with wood and the town was without fire protection. The town began to rebuild and a fire brigade was formed. Orlando became a city in 1885 and the arrival of the Atlantic Coast Line Railroad in 1890 brought tremendous growth. Commercial activity shifted away from the courthouse and moved to the new railroad depot located on Church Street. Settlers from England arrived in Orlando and established homes and businesses. One of the newly arrived Englishmen was named Joseph Bumby. He and his family settled in the town and built a hardware store known as "Bumby Hardware Store". The store remained an Orlando fixture until the 1960s, but the name "Bumby" is still famous in the city.

=== Downtown's heyday ===
By the 1920s, Orlando had grown from a cattle town to a major citrus growing center. The Florida land boom of the 1920s brought many newcomers to the city. The population increase led to the construction of the Orlando Public Library in 1923, the Orlando Municipal Auditorium (now Bob Carr Performing Arts Centre) in 1926, and several grand hotels; namely the Angebilt Hotel and San Juan Hotel. By this time, the city's population had grown to 9,000 people.

=== Great Depression to post-war years ===
The federal government's Works Progress Administration programs during the Great Depression helped Orlando remain economically stable. New parks were developed, the Municipal Airport (now Orlando Executive Airport) was built, and the city also built a new football stadium at Tinker Field (now the site of Florida Citrus Bowl). By 1944, enough jobs were created to increase the city's population to 45,000 people. Orlando became a major military center when World War II brought the development of McCoy Air Force Base and Pinecastle AFB, located southeast of downtown. This status intensified with the 1968 opening of the Orlando Naval Training Center east of downtown.

=== Decline and redevelopment ===
Walt Disney World's 1971 opening in southwest Orange County brought major development to Orlando, but relatively little to the downtown area. During this time, development in downtown was mainly focused upon the construction of office towers, such as the Citrus Center and the original Sunbank building. However, downtown began to fall into a state of decline. The Angebilt Hotel and San Juan Hotel were abandoned and left to crumble. The San Juan was eventually demolished in 1980, but the Angebilt Hotel at 37 N Orange Ave which was built in 1923 would be transformed in modern times into an office building with retail on the ground floor. Lake Eola Park became a haven for prostitutes and drug addicts. In addition, downtown department stores and family owned businesses closed or moved to the newly constructed Orlando Fashion Square mall. After the opening of Interstate 4, the downtown population base moved out of downtown to the suburbs.

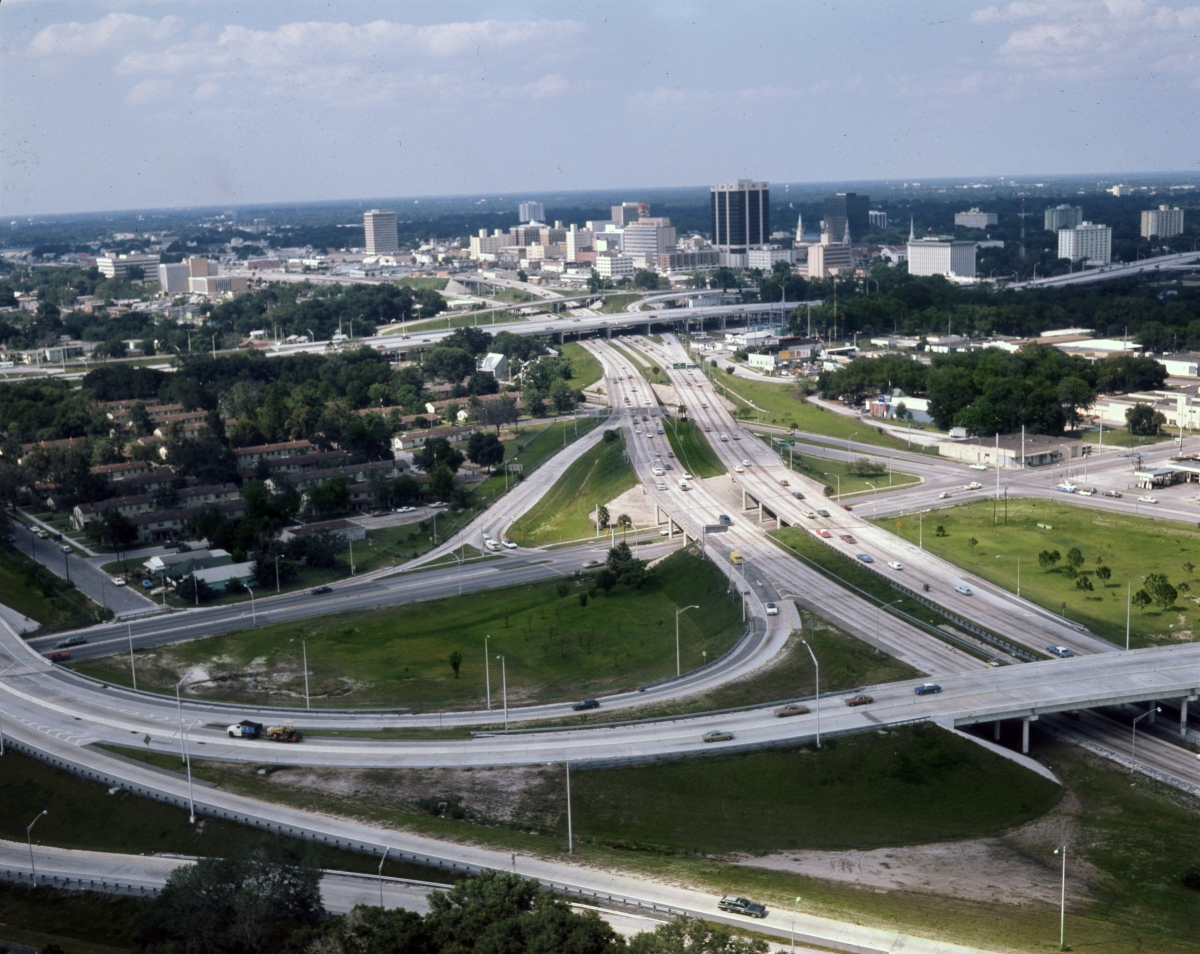
Aerial view of Interstate 4 and Downtown Orlando, 1976

Efforts to revitalize downtown began in the mid-1970s and continued into the 1980s. Bob Snow opened Rosie O'Grady's in 1974 at Church Street Station, which quickly became a popular attraction. In the mid-1980s, several skyscrapers were constructed; including SunTrust Center and Barnett Plaza (now Bank of America Center). Lake Eola Park was redesigned and the Walt Disney Amphitheater opened in the park around the same time the annual "Orlando Shakespeare Festival" was established. On the other hand, downtown's population base still had yet to rebound to previous levels and major corporations were still opening locations outside of the city center.

The Orlando City Hall building, the city's third, opened in 1991 directly behind the previous City Hall, constructed in 1958. To clear the area for future development, the Orlando City Council chose to implode the 1950s building. The event was met with much local fanfare and was filmed for use in the opening scenes of the 1992 film Lethal Weapon 3. The area cleared is now occupied by CNL City Center Commons.

=== Recent years ===
Until the late 1990s, downtown was relatively small compared to other cities of Orlando's size. A building boom began in 1998 and continued through the 2000s decade. New commercial towers sprouted along Orange Avenue and residential towers were constructed around Lake Eola and along Magnolia Ave. CNL Financial Group established a major footprint in downtown with the construction of CNL City Center Commons, a complex of office towers surrounding Orlando City Hall. CNL continues to expand their presence downtown. As a result of the construction boom, downtown density doubled and Orlando's skyline dramatically changed. In 2005, the term "Manhattanization" was locally applied to Orange Avenue when a large number of construction cranes loomed over downtown. The late 2000s recession slowed large intensity skyscraper construction; but infill development continued downtown including construction of the Amway Center in 2009.

In 2011, construction began on phase one of the long-awaited Dr. Phillips Center for the Performing Arts across from City Hall along Orange Ave.

== High-rise buildings ==
The majority of the tallest towers in Central Florida are located downtown. Of the 79 existing high-rises in the Greater Orlando region, 46 are located downtown.

The tallest high-rises in Orlando are:

- Suntrust Center, 1988, 441 ft (134 m) is the tallest building in Central Florida.
- The Vue at Lake Eola, 2008, 426 ft (130 m)
- The Orange County Courthouse, 1997, 416 ft (127 m)
- The Bank of America Center, 1988, 404 ft (123 m)
- 55 West on the Esplanade, 2009, 377 ft (115 m)
- Solaire at the Plaza, 2006, 359 ft (109 m)
- One Eleven Building, 2009, 357 ft (109 m)
- SunTrust Center at Church Street Station, Under Construction, 326 ft (100 m)
- Citi Tower, 2017, 292 ft (89 m)
- Modera Central, 2018, 260 ft (80m)
- Citrus Center, 1971, 258 ft (79 m)
- Premier Trade Plaza Orlando, 2006, 256 ft (78 m)
- CNL Center City Commons, 1999, 250 ft (76 m)

Towers built in downtown Orlando have not exceeded 441 ft (134 m) since the completion of the Suntrust Center in 1988. There has never been an "official" reason why, but local architects speculate it is due to the Orlando Executive Airport location just east of downtown. The airport's flight path is over the city center, thus the Federal Aviation Administration has imposed height restrictions.

== Road Transportation ==
Downtown Orlando is served by a network of major highways, arterials, secondary roads, and a robust public transportation system.

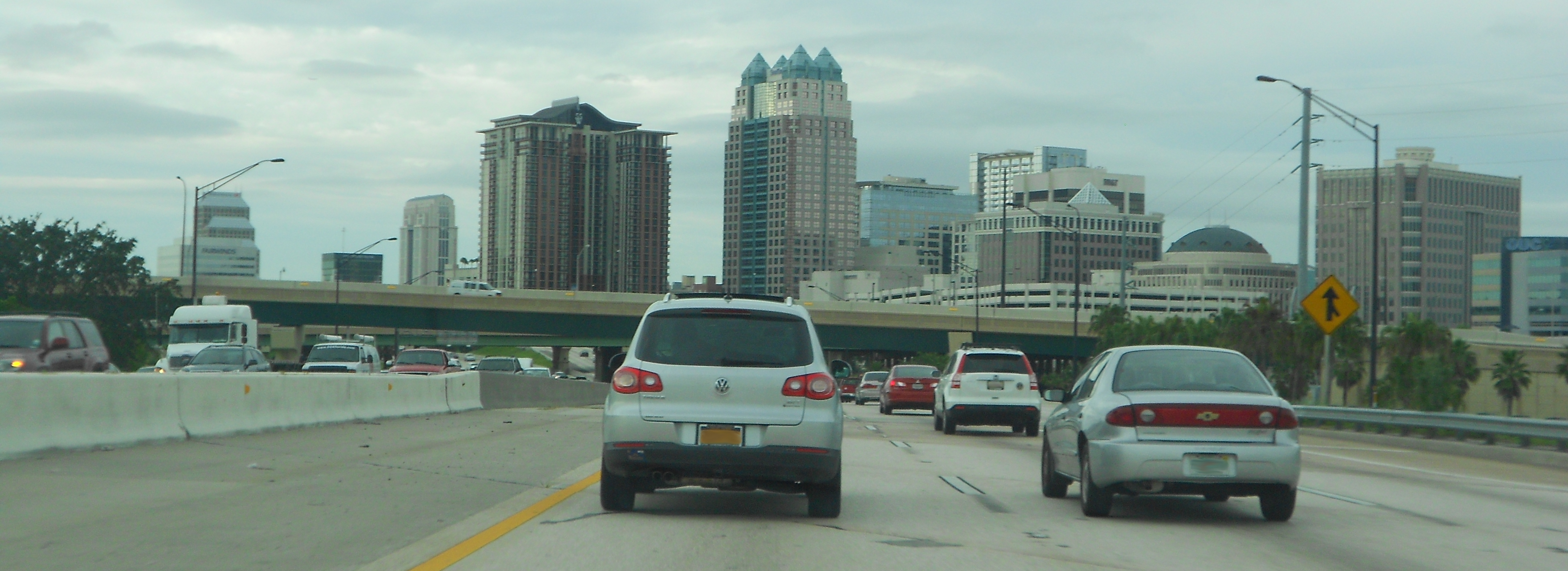
I-4 East

=== Limited Access Highways ===
- Interstate 4 (I-4) – Runs through downtown Orlando, providing connectivity to Tampa and Daytona Beach.
- Spessard L. Holland East-West Expressway (SR 408) – An east-west toll road facilitating access across the Orlando metropolitan area.

=== Arterials ===
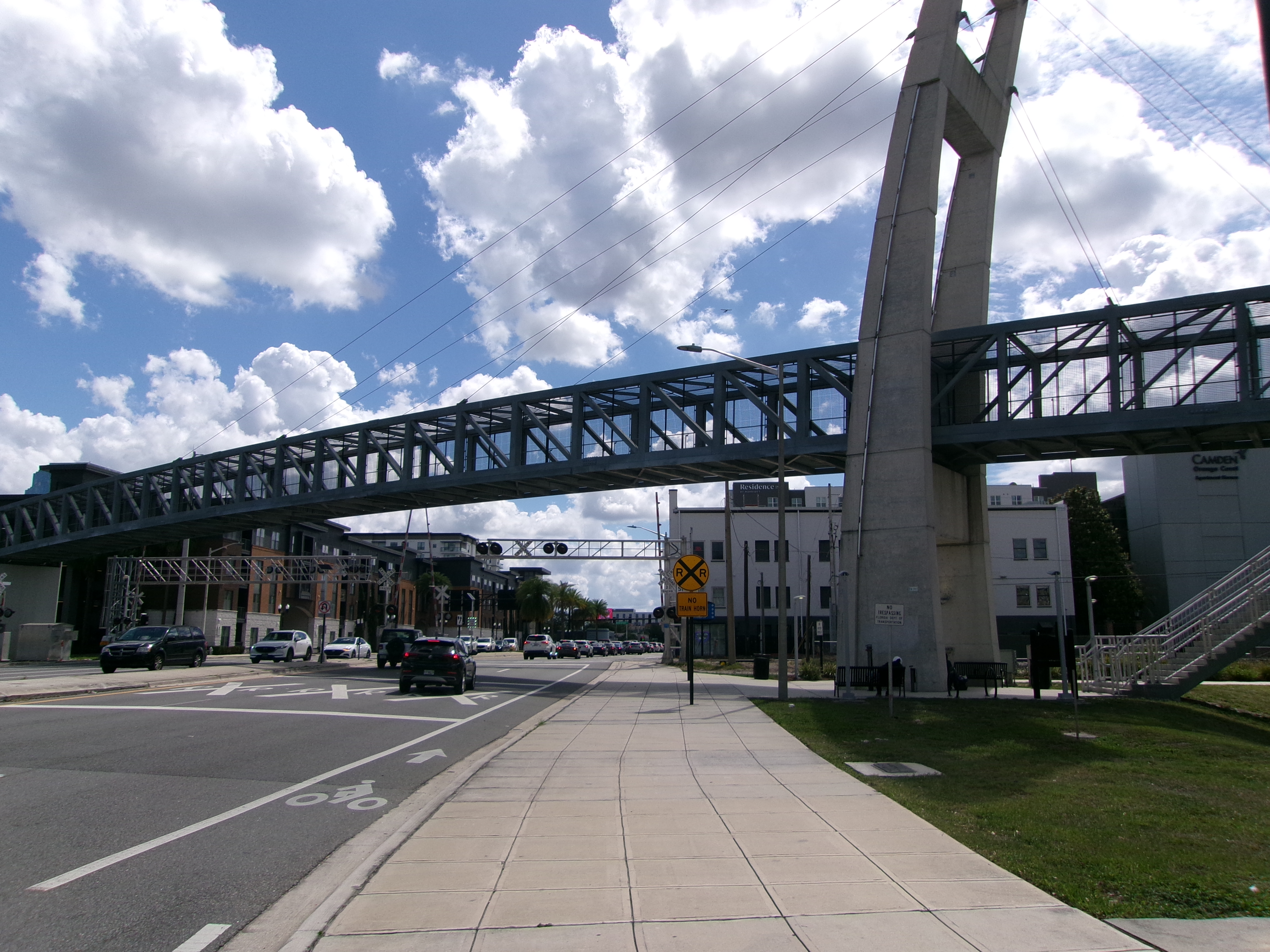
Pedestrian bridge over US Route 17/92 and Florida State Road 50 as they cross the SunRail and Amtrak railroad line.

- Orange Avenue (SR 527) – Southbound one-way arterial through downtown.
- Rosalind Avenue (SR 527) – Northbound one-way counterpart to Orange Avenue.
- Colonial Drive (US 17/92-SR 50) – Major east-west route traversing downtown.
- Orange Blossom Trail (US 441) – Significant north-south corridor west of downtown.

=== Secondary Roads ===
- South Street (SR 15) – Westbound along SR 408.
- Anderson Street (SR 15) – Eastbound along SR 408.
- Hughey Avenue – Southbound parallel to I-4.
- Garland Avenue – Northbound parallel to I-4.
- Robinson Street – East-west route along the north side of Lake Eola.
- Central Boulevard – East-west route along the south side of Lake Eola.

== Public Transportation ==
=== Bus ===
The Central Florida Regional Transportation Authority (CFRTA), known as Lynx, operates regional bus services with its central station and offices located at 455 N Garland Avenue.

Lynx operates a zero-fare bus service called LYMMO, featuring multiple lines that run along dedicated rights-of-way. This system offers efficient travel within the downtown area, often superior to automobile transit. The LYMMO lines include:

- Orange Line – Runs along the Orange Avenue corridor, extending north to AdventHealth Orlando and south to Michigan Street.
- Grapefruit Line – Provides an east-west connection from the Citrus Bowl to Thornton Park.
- Lime Line – Connects Parramore neighborhood to the Central Business District and extends to Creative Village.
- Plum Line – Serves the north quarter and extends to the Marks Street Senior Recreation Complex.

=== Rail ===
Downtown Orlando is served by multiple rail services, enhancing connectivity within Florida and beyond.

==== Amtrak ====
The Orlando Amtrak Station, located approximately a mile south of the central business district, continues to operate the Silver Meteor and Silver Star lines, providing service to destinations such as New York City, Miami, and Tampa.

==== SunRail ====
SunRail, the north–south commuter rail service that commenced operations in 2014, initially connected DeBary in the north to Poinciana in the south. In August 2024, the Northern Expansion extended the service by 12.2 miles, reaching the new DeLand station. Further plans are underway for the Sunshine Corridor project, aiming to connect SunRail to key destinations such as Orlando International Airport (MCO), the Orange County Convention Center, and Disney Springs. In February 2025, the City of Orlando and Seminole County each pledged $500,000 towards a $6 million feasibility study for this expansion. Additionally, Universal Orlando committed $2 million to support the study, reflecting a collaborative effort to enhance regional connectivity.

==== Brightline ====
Brightline, a high-speed intercity rail service, began operations between Orlando and Miami on September 22, 2023. The Orlando station, situated at the Orlando International Airport Intermodal Terminal, connects travelers to South Florida destinations, including West Palm Beach, Boca Raton, Fort Lauderdale, Aventura, and Miami, with trains reaching speeds up to 125 mph.

=== Air ===
The Orlando Executive Airport is located approximately 4 miles (6.4 km) east of the Central Business District. While not within downtown proper, it serves the downtown district, offering facilities for general aviation and corporate flights.

=== Future Developments ===
The Sunshine Corridor project is poised to transform Central Florida's transportation landscape by connecting SunRail and Brightline services to major destinations. This expansion aims to provide residents and visitors with efficient, multimodal transportation options, reducing reliance on personal vehicles and promoting sustainable urban development.

Additionally, Orlando is exploring advanced air mobility solutions. Plans are underway to develop "vertiports" at Orlando International Airport to accommodate electric vertical takeoff and landing (eVTOL) aircraft, with the first facilities expected by 2028. This initiative positions Orlando at the forefront of integrating innovative transportation technologies into its infrastructure.

These developments underscore Orlando's commitment to enhancing its transportation infrastructure, offering improved mobility and fostering economic growth throughout the region.

== Government ==
Orlando City Hall is located on Orange Avenue and South Street.

The Orange County Courthouse is located on north Orange Avenue.

The US District Court Middle District of Florida's courthouse is located at 401 West Central Boulevard.

The United States Postal Service downtown office is located at 51 East Jefferson Street.

== Education and institutions ==
=== Public and private schools ===
- Lake Highland Preparatory School
- Howard Middle School
- Hillcrest Elementary School
- Trinity Lutheran School
- Fern Creek Elementary
- Jones High School
- William R. Boone High School
- The Christ School
- Blankner K-8

=== Colleges ===
- Valencia College - satellite campus
- University of Central Florida - Downtown Campus
- UCF - Florida Interactive Entertainment Academy
- Florida A&M University - School of Law
- Florida State University College of Medicine - Orlando Regional Campus
- AdventHealth University

=== Places of worship ===
- First Presbyterian Church of Orlando
- First United Methodist Church of Orlando
- St. James Cathedral in Orlando
- First United Methodist Church
- Hospital Church
- Masjid Al Haq Mosque
- Trinity Lutheran Church
- Downtown Baptist Church
- Park Lake Presbyterian Church
- City Beautiful Church
- Summit Church
- Celebration Church
- Cathedral Church of St. Luke
- Mt. Zion Missionary Baptist Institutional Church

=== Hospitals ===
- AdventHealth Orlando
- AdventHealth for Children
- AdventHealth for Women
- Orlando Regional Medical Center
- Arnold Palmer Hospital for Children
- Winnie Palmer Hospital for Women and Babies
- M. D. Anderson Cancer Center Orlando
- ORMC - Lucerne Pavilion

== Places of interest ==
Loch Haven Park, north of downtown on Mills and Princeton Avenues, serves as the cultural center of Orlando and consists of the following:

- The Orlando Family Stage
- The Orlando Science Center
- The Orlando Shakespeare Theater
- The Orlando Museum of Art
- The Mennello Museum of American Art
- Harriett's Orlando Ballet Centre

The "Cultural Park Master Plan" published in 2009, details plans to expand Loch Haven Park to former USDA property located adjacent the park, and calling for additional cultural institutions to be housed onsite.

=== Arts and culture ===
- Calle Orange, an annual heritage festival celebrating Puerto Rican culture.
- The Orange County Regional History Center - Located on Central Blvd. The building was once the Orange County Courthouse.
- Mad Cow Theatre produces a season of classical and contemporary plays and musicals in its intimate two-theatre complex.
- CityArts Factory - Located in the CBD. Features works by local artists and holds workshops.
- SAK Comedy Lab - A 200-seat professional improvisation comedy theater and school, with graduates including Wayne Brady, Jonathan Mangum, Karey Kirkpatrick.
- Plaza Cinema Cafe - The first movie theater in downtown in nearly half a century.
- The Daily City Mobile Art Show - An art gallery in the back of a moving truck which displays works by local artists in various locations around Central Florida.
- Public Art - Orange County Government has several public art installations around Downtown.
- The Orlando Cabaret Festival - an annual festival produced east spring by Mad Cow Theatre attracts local and international Cabaret artists for over 40 performances at the theatre. Features lunchtime and evening performances and special events.
- The Orlando Film Festival
- Orlando International Fringe Theater Festival

=== Hotels ===
Major hotels in downtown Orlando include:

- Crowne Plaza Orlando Downtown Hotel
- Embassy Suites Orlando - Downtown
- Grand Bohemian Hotel Orlando (Marriott)
- Sheraton Orlando Downtown Hotel
- DoubleTree by Hilton - Orlando Downtown

== Sports ==
Downtown is home to the Kia Center (formerly Amway Center) which hosts the Orlando Magic NBA team, the Orlando Solar Bears ECHL team, and the Orlando Predators Arena Football League team. Camping World Stadium in addition to being home of the Orlando Guardians XFL team and Orlando City Soccer Club for 2015 & 2016 also hosts The Capital One Bowl in addition to other events year round. Tinker Field was a historic ballpark adjacent to Camping World Stadium. Inter.co Stadium is the home of Orlando Pride. It is also home to the WWE Performance Center.

== Diplomatic missions ==
- Mexican Consulate Orlando
- Consulate of Haiti Orlando
- French Consulate Orlando
- Argentine Consulate Orlando
- Consulate of the Ivory Coast - Orlando
- Dutch Consulate in Orlando
- Austrian Consulate in Orlando
- Jamaican Consulate Orlando
- Colombian Consulate Orlando

Resulting from Orlando's reputation as a major international destination and many countries establishing consulates in the city, Orlando now has the second highest number of foreign consulates in Florida next to Miami.

== Popular culture ==
Downtown Orlando's skyline can be seen in the films Paper Towns, Passenger 57, Ernest Saves Christmas, D.A.R.Y.L., Larry the Cable Guy: Health Inspector, Lethal Weapon 3 (doubled for Los Angeles), and Miami Connection.

Seven Mary Three's fourth studio album is entitled Orange Avenue.

== Redevelopment ==
The Triple Crown for Downtown, a construction initiative involving three high intensity public works projects, began in 2010 and is almost complete.

- Kia Center (formerly Amway Center) - The first initiative of the Triple Crown. Construction began in 2008 and was completed in October, 2010. It is the new home of the Orlando Magic. In addition to other events, the venue has brought major concerts back to Orlando (the former "Amway Arena" was deemed too small for major concerts by promoters).
- Dr. Phillips Center for the Performing Arts - Located across from City Hall on Orange Ave, it replaced the Bob Carr Performing Arts Centre and is being built in phases. Phase I is already complete with a 2,800 seat amplified hall and a 300-seat theater for smaller productions. Phase II, currently under construction, will include a 1,700 seat acoustic hall for ballet, orchestra, and opera performances.
- Camping World Stadium - Located to the west of downtown and formerly named "The Florida Citrus Bowl", is an outdoor venue for sports and large events. The stadium was 80% rebuilt with construction completing in 2017.

A more ambitious project currently under construction is completely transforming the Orlando Centroplex, the home of the former Amway Arena, into a "Creative Village". The project is privately funded with satellite schools for the University of Central Florida and the University of Florida, 1 million square feet (93,000 m^{2}) of office space, residential apartment buildings, and a large central park with sporting facilities and an amphitheater.
