= The VUE at Lake Eola =

Residential skyscraper in Downtown Orlando

The Vue at Lake Eola
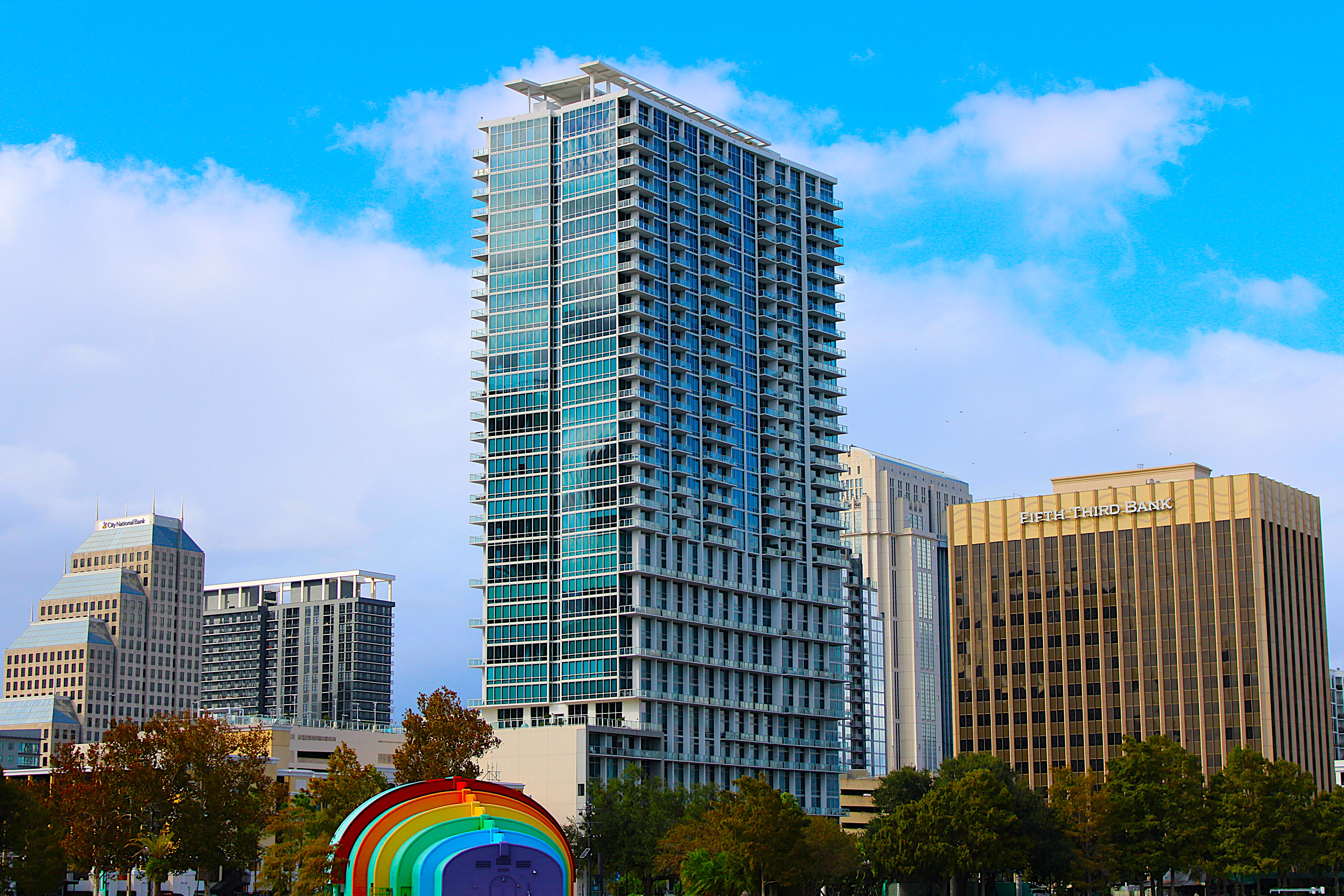
- Interactive map of the The Vue at Lake Eola area

General information
- Type: Condominium
- Location: 150 East Robinson Street; Orlando, Florida; United States
- Coordinates: 28.54534°N 81.37618°W
- Completed: 2008

Height
- Roof: 426 ft (129.8 m)

Technical details
- Floor count: 36

The Vue at Lake Eola is a residential skyscraper in Downtown Orlando. It is the third tallest building in the city, being only two feet shorter than Hyatt Regency Orlando and 15 feet (4.6 m) shorter than 200 South Orange. It houses 34 floors of condos and has penthouses on its top level. The penthouses have access to the balcony on the 36th floor roof of the building.

== Details ==
When The Vue opened most of the 375 units had already been sold. The prices for the units ranged from US$500,000 to US$3 million for the top Penthouse units, as they had been purchased before the United States housing bubble burst.

The sides and "crown" of the building light up at night with blue lights. During December the side lights have a light show with red and green Christmas colors.

The building, which took about 3 years to construct, opened in January 2008 and has about 200,000 square feet (19,000 m^{2}) of space. The building's pool is elevated about 100 feet (30 m) in the air, and sits next to its tennis and basketball courts which are also elevated.

== See also ==
- Downtown Orlando
- Orlando, Florida
- List of tallest buildings in Orlando
