= Lincoln Plaza =

Lincoln Plaza can mean:

- 1 Lincoln Plaza in New York City
- Lincoln Plaza at SunTrust Center in Orlando, Florida
- Lincoln Plaza (London), on the Isle of Dogs in London
- Ross Tower in Dallas, Texas, known as Lincoln Plaza until 2013
