= Hyatt Regency Orlando =

Hotel in Orlando, Florida

Coordinates: 28.427515°N 81.468462°W

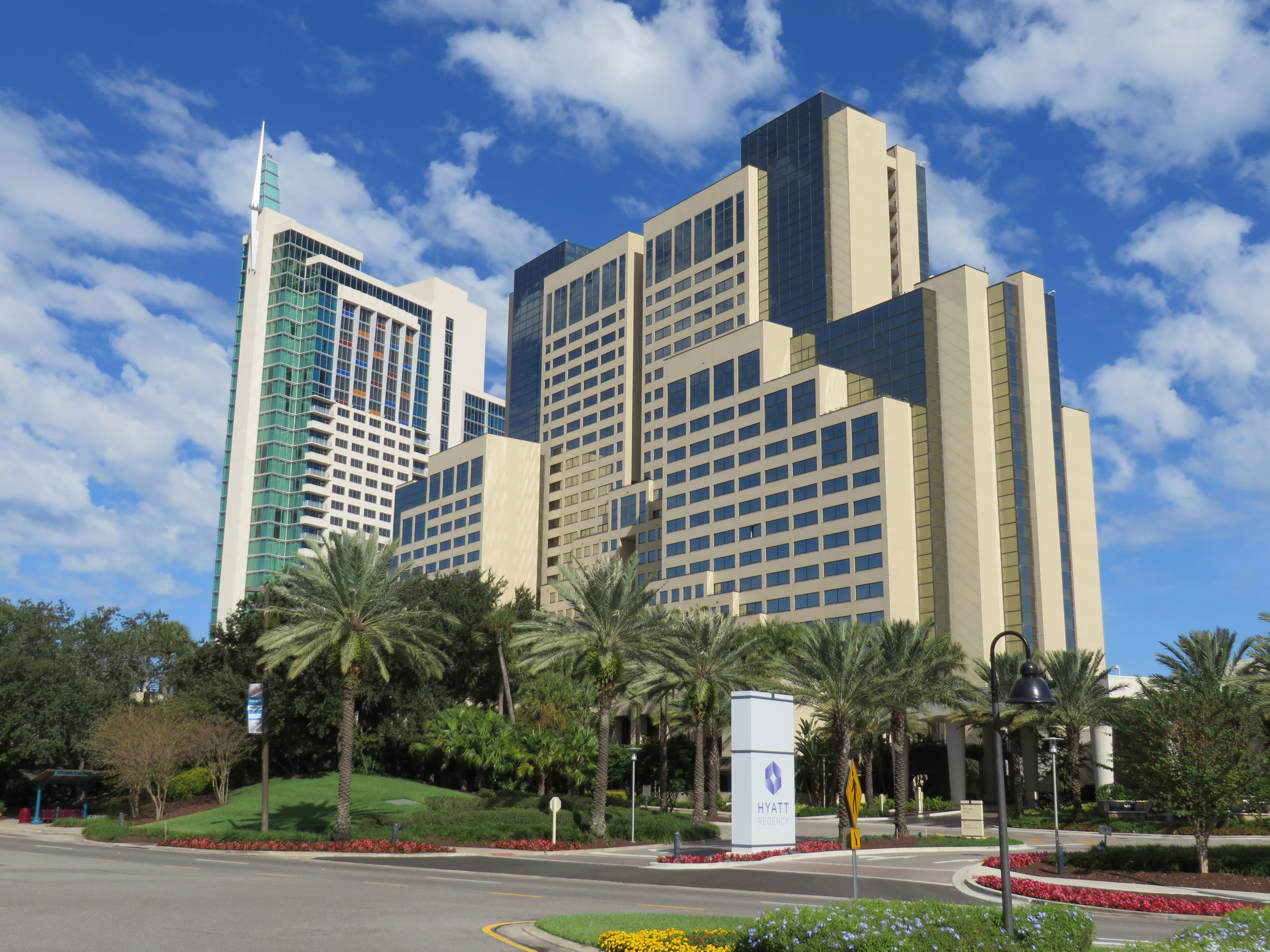
- Hyatt Regency Orlando
- Interactive map of the Hyatt Regency Orlando area

General information
- Location: Unincorporated Orange County in Orlando, Florida, 9801 International Drive
- Opening: November 1, 1986; 39 years ago
- Owner: RIDA Development Corporation & Ares Management Real Estate
- Management: Hyatt Hotels

Height
- Height: 428 ft (130.5 m)

Other information
- Number of rooms: 1641

Website
- orlando.regency.hyatt.com

The Hyatt Regency Orlando is a 32-story, 1641-room resort hotel, directly connected to the Orange County Convention Center, located on International Drive in Orlando, Florida.

== History ==
The hotel opened on November 1, 1986 as The Peabody Orlando, being a brand extension of the original Peabody Hotel in Memphis, Tennessee.

In 2010, a $450 million renovation of the hotel added a 31-story tower that doubled the number of rooms from 891 to 1641 and added a resort pool complex. This tower, standing 428 ft (130 m), is the second tallest building in metropolitan Orlando, surpassed only by the SunTrust Center.

On August 28, 2013, UST Hotel Joint Venture Ltd. sold The Peabody Orlando for $717 million, to Hyatt. The hotel was renamed Hyatt Regency Orlando on October 1, 2013.

In 2024, Hyatt announced that it had agreed to sell the hotel and 45 acres of adjacent land to RIDA Development Corporation and Ares Management Real Estate for $1.07 billion. Hyatt continues operating the hotel through a long-term management agreement. Hyatt president and CEO Mark S. Hoplamazian called this “the largest single-asset sale in Hyatt history.” The new owners announced they will construct a new Grand Hyatt-branded hotel on the adjoining undeveloped land.

In August 2024, it was announced that the RIDA/Aires joint venture had completed the purchase of the hotel.

== Gallery ==
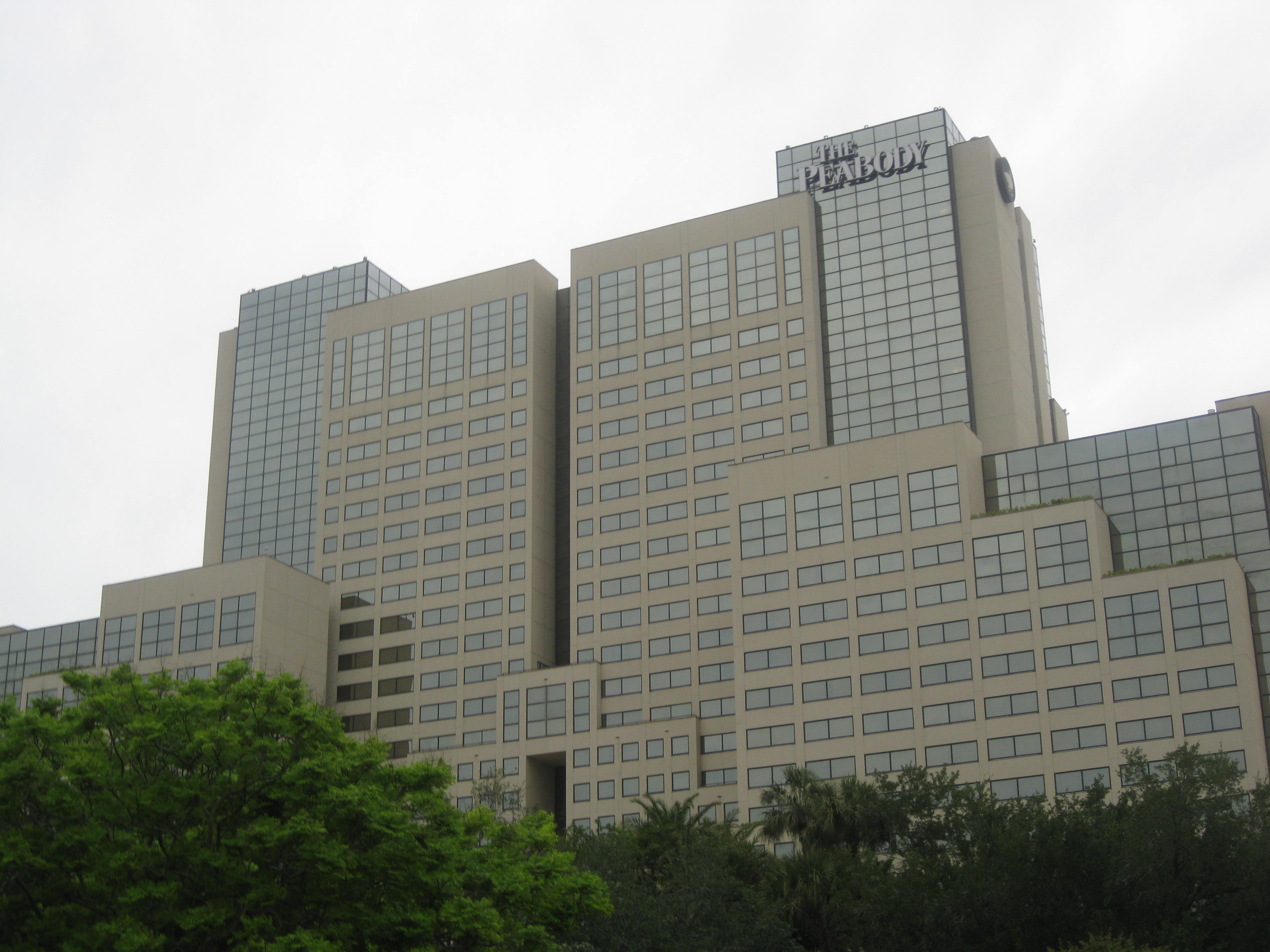
Hyatt Regency Orlando

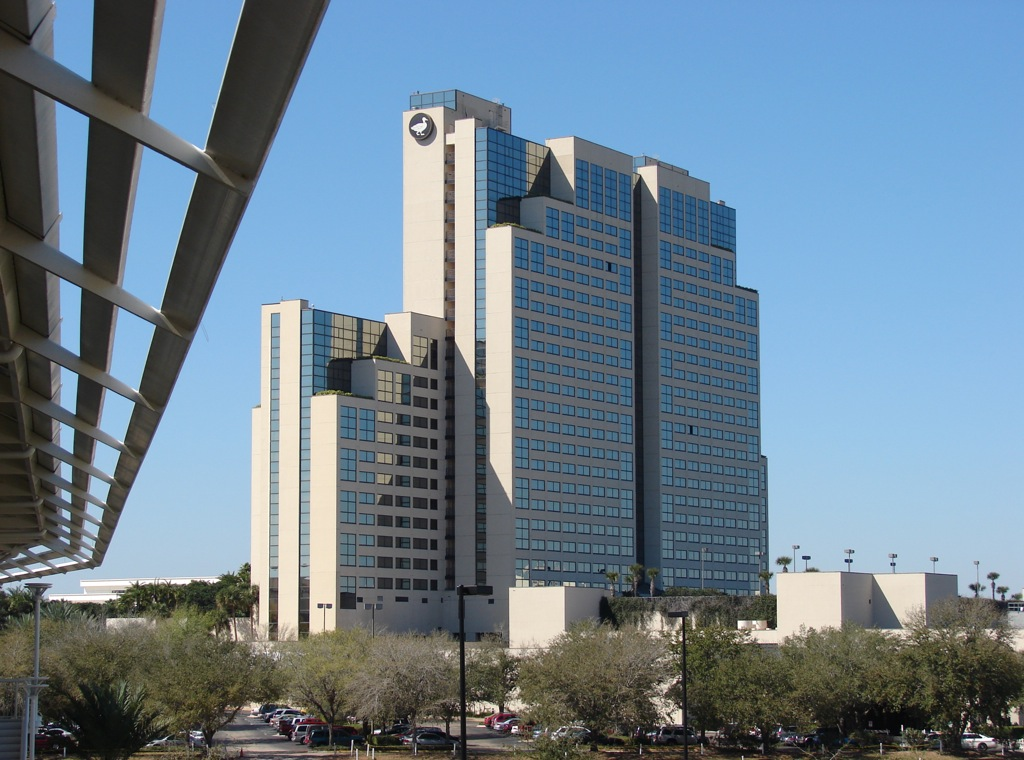
Back side of the Original building in 2007

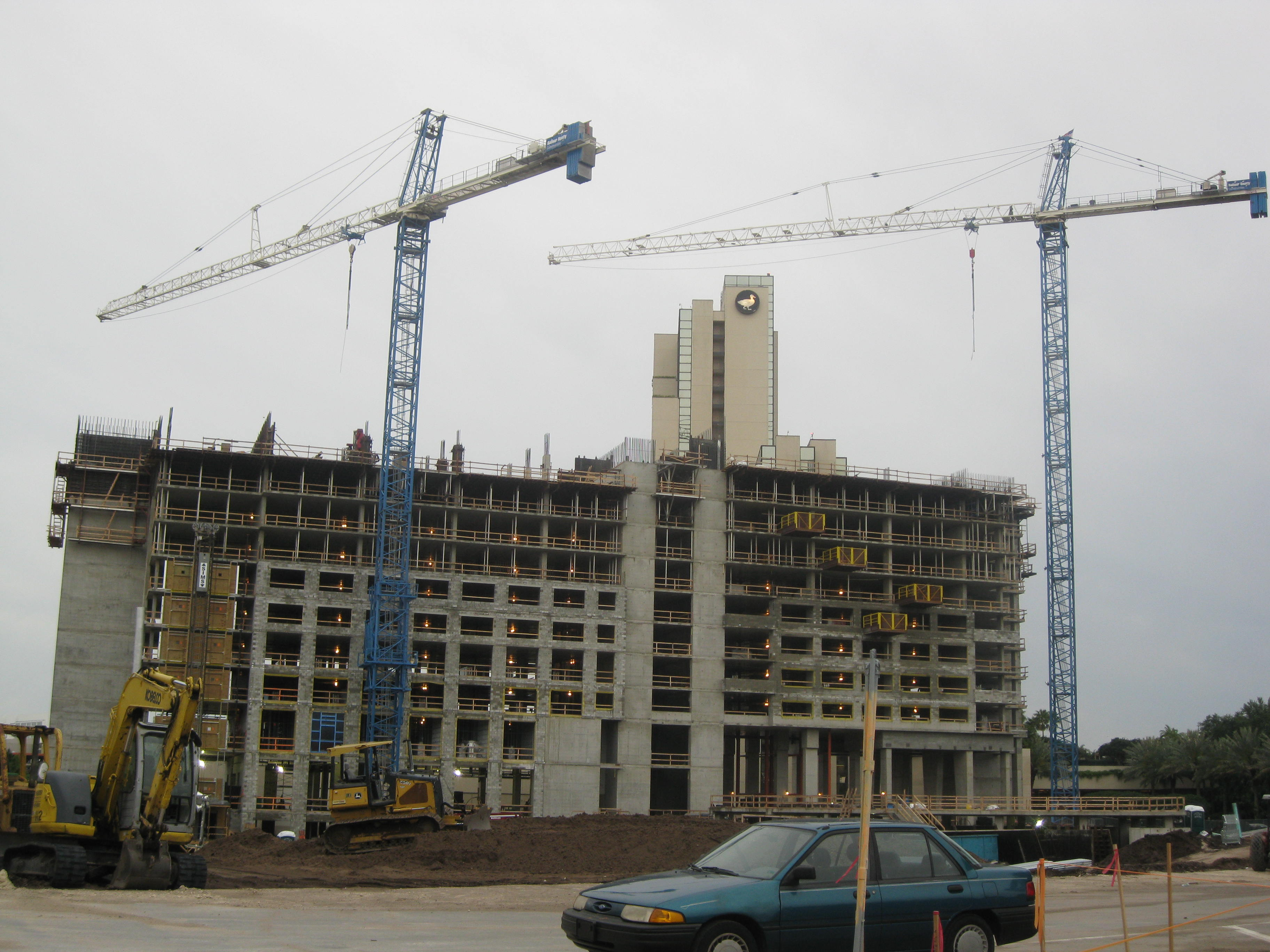
The new building under construction in April 2009

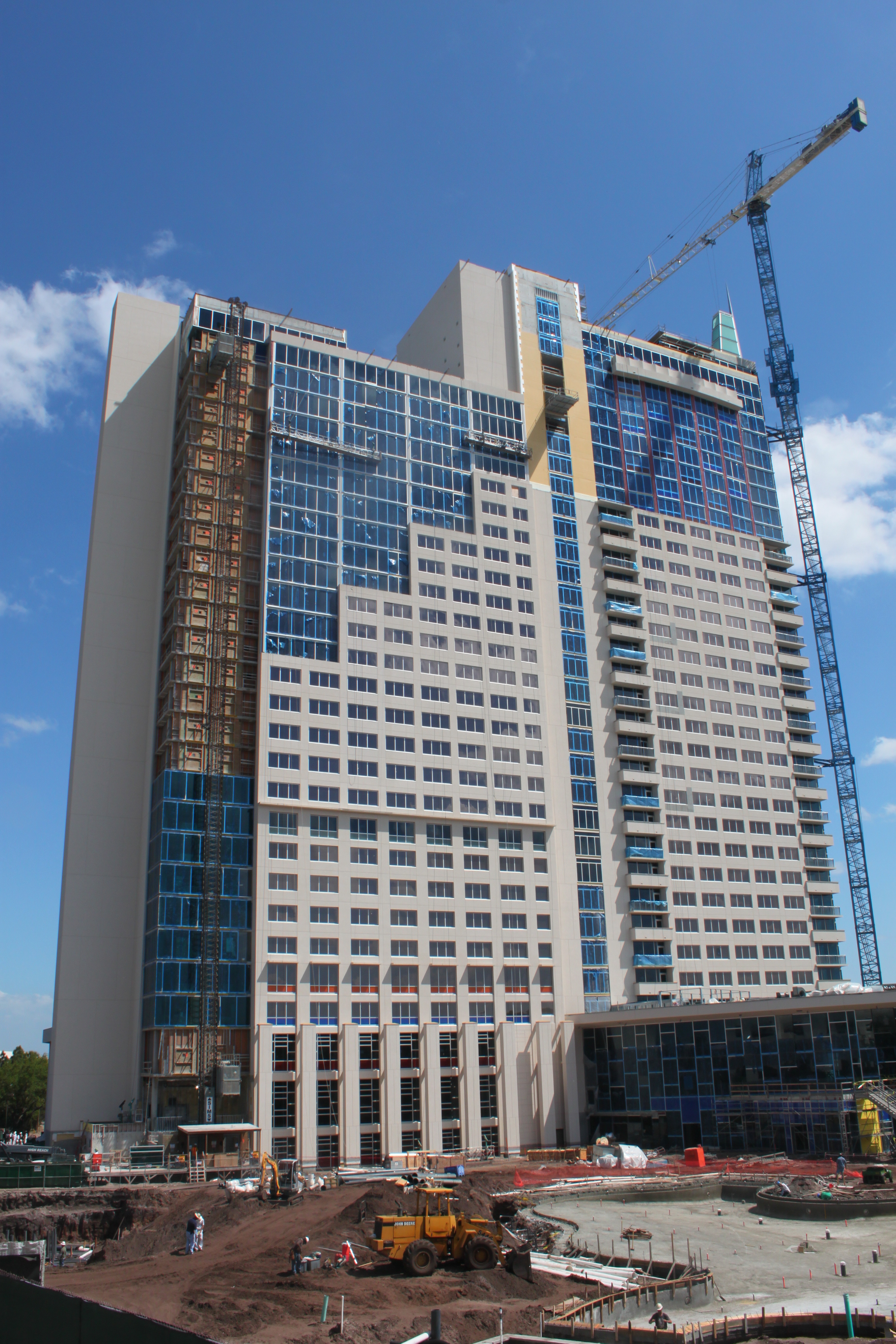
Expansion Progress in April 2010
