= SeaWorld SkyTower =

Observation tower at SeaWorld parks

SkyTower
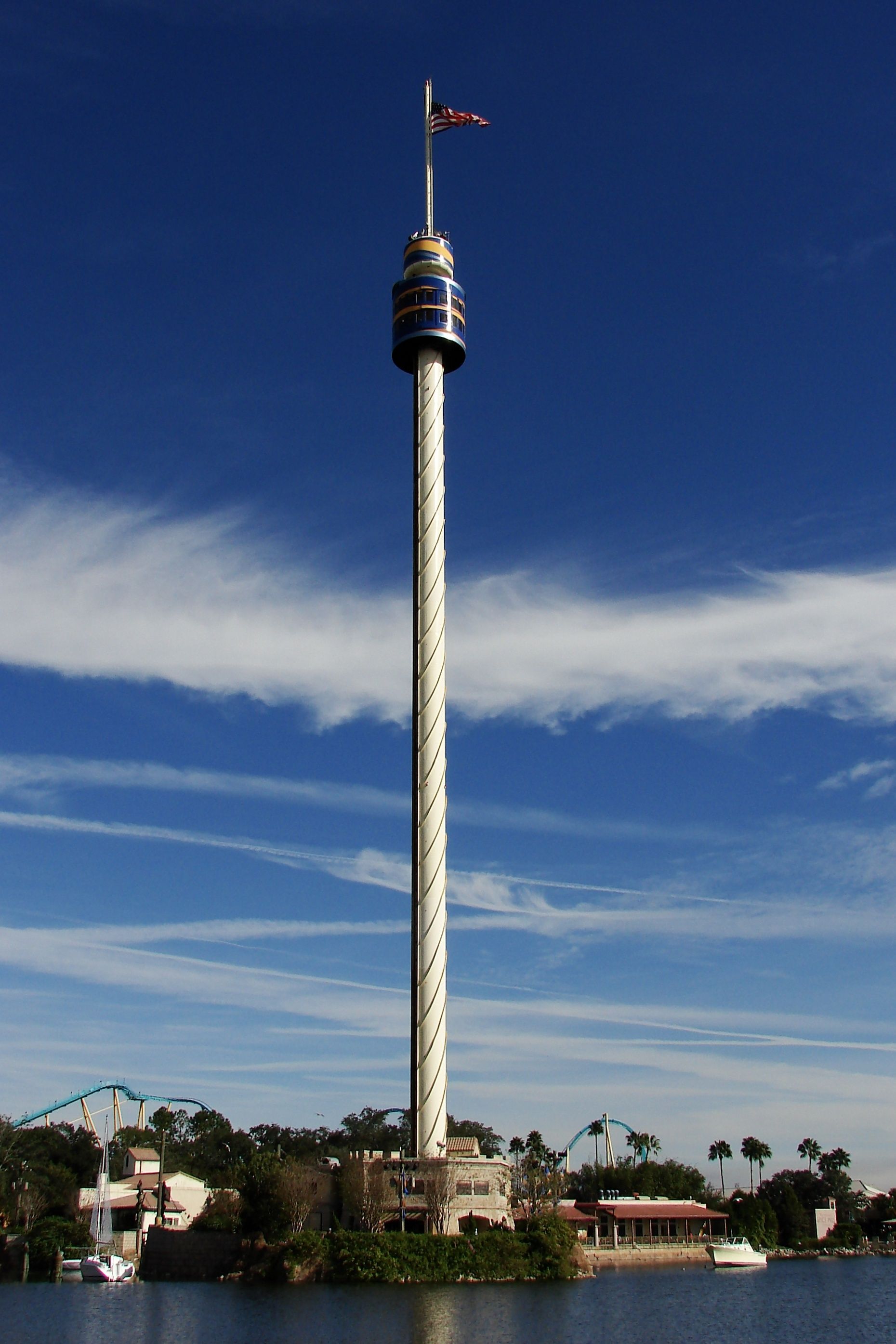
- Sky Tower at SeaWorld Orlando
- Interactive map of the SkyTower area

General information
- Status: Operational
- Type: Observation tower/gyro tower
- Location: 7007 Sea World Drive; Orlando, Florida and 500 Sea World Drive; San Diego, California; U.S.
- Coordinates: 28.410373°N 81.461443°W 32.7654271°N 117.2292372°W
- Completed: California 1969; Florida 1974
- Owner: SeaWorld

Height
- Antenna spire: Florida 425 ft (129.5 m)
- Roof: California 320 feet (97.5 m); Florida 400 feet (121.9 m)

Technical details
- Floor count: 2

SeaWorld SkyTower (also known as SeaWorld Sky Tower) is the name of two observation towers located at SeaWorld San Diego and SeaWorld Orlando.

== SeaWorld San Diego ==
The SeaWorld San Diego SkyTower is a 320-foot (98 m) gyro tower that was constructed in 1968 by Sansei Yusoki Co., Ltd of Japan. It opened in 1969 and gives passengers a six-minute view of the park and surrounding San Diego. It rises at a rate of 150 feet per minute (46 m/min) while spinning slowly at 1.02 rpm. The original ride vehicle was replaced in 2002.

== SeaWorld Orlando ==
The SeaWorld Orlando Sky Tower is a similar gyro tower and was constructed in 1973 though it did not open until summer 1974. The tower is the tallest observation tower in Florida and contains a double decker rotating pod. In February 2013, it received new LED lights from Electronic Theater Control. The tower is 400 feet (120 m) from the base to the top of the structure, but riders only reach a height of 365 feet (111 m). The highest point of the structure, the topping flagpole, is 425 feet (130 m) above the ground.

=== Incident ===
On December 22, 2015, Sky Tower became stuck 200 feet (61 m) in the air. There were about 50 people on the ride at the time, and it took two hours to get all passengers down.

== See also ==
- List of tallest buildings in Orlando
