= Orlando City Hall =

City government building in Orlando, Florida

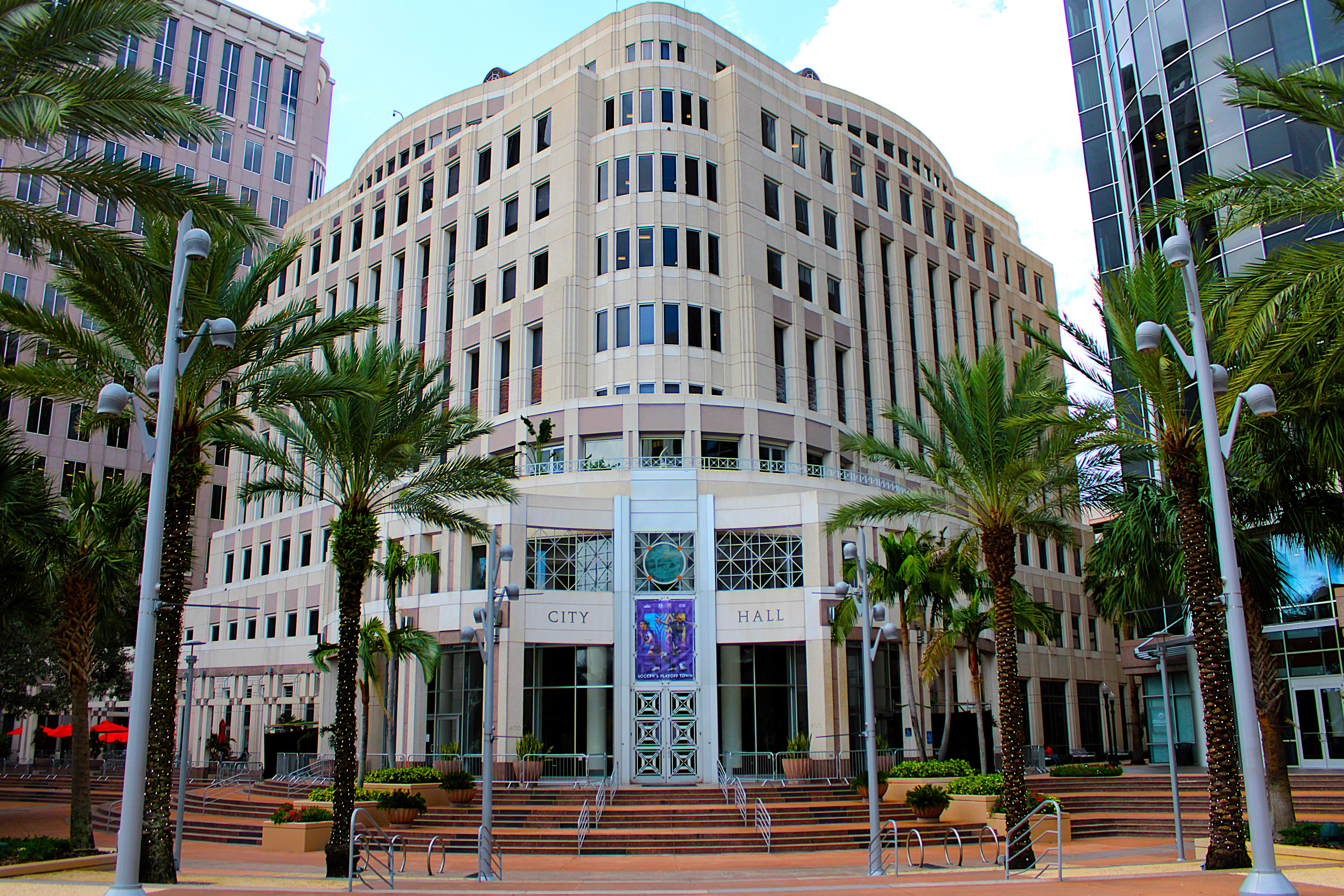
- Interactive map of the Orlando City Hall area

General information
- Architectural style: Postmodern
- Location: 400 South Orange Avenue; Orlando, Florida 32801, United States
- Coordinates: 28.537590°N 81.379596°W
- Construction started: 1989
- Completed: 1992
- Opened: 1992
- Cost: US$32 million

Height
- Height: 156 ft (48 m)

Technical details
- Floor count: 9

Design and construction
- Architecture firm: HKS, Inc.

Website
- cityoforlando.net

Orlando City Hall is the headquarters of the City of Orlando government. The downtown city hall is a 9 floor, postmodern building constructed by Lincoln Property Company and completed in 1992. The building is located in downtown Orlando at the CNL Center City Commons building complex, on the corner of South Orange Avenue and South Street.

Heller Manus Architects was the design architect. The building design, reminiscent of the great civic architecture of the past, features a 120-foot copper dome and handsome sculptural granite aggregate precast concrete panels. Visitors enter the building through the ‘Great Room’, a rotunda-like space that acts as the city’s formal and informal living room. This space features a dramatic grand staircase that leads to the city council chambers.

Construction of the $32 million city hall was overseen by assistant city attorney Lew Oliver and was financed with revenue bonds.

The previous eight-story city hall building was blown up and filmed for the opening scene of the 1992 action film Lethal Weapon 3.

== See also ==
- List of tallest buildings in Orlando
