= 55 West =

Coordinates: 28°32′27″N 81°22′49″W

55 West on the Esplanade
- Interactive map of the 55 West on the Esplanade area

General information
- Type: Residential
- Location: 55 West Church Street; Orlando, Florida; United States
- Construction started: 2005
- Completed: 2009

Height
- Roof: 377 ft (114.9 m)

Technical details
- Floor count: 32
- Floor area: 1,214,998 sq ft (112,877.0 m^{2})

Design and construction
- Architects: Baker Barrios Architects, Inc.
- Main contractor: PCL Construction Services, Inc.

Other information
- Number of units: 461
- Parking: 1,072

55 West, commonly referenced as, simply, 55 W, is an apartment tower in Downtown Orlando. The building overlooks Church Street Station, and stands next to 200 South Orange. Built in 2009, the building is the fifth-tallest building in downtown

== Details ==
The building has a slanted almost "house-like" roof compared with traditional, flat roofs found on many commercial buildings within the area. The top point is lit blue at night. This all makes the building a unique part of the skyline, especially at night.

The building's pool is elevated and overlooks central downtown. The pool has a tropical theme.

The building has multiple amenities and houses a convenience store and restaurant on the ground floor. The associated development across Church Street contains a piano bar and the Mad Cow Theatre complex.

In 2017 Blackstone Real Estate Income Trust (BREIT Mf 55 West LLC) purchased the building for $105,000,000 from TA Realty (Realty Associates Fund Ix Lp). The building is now managed by ZRS, Greystar managed the building for the previous owner.
