= CNL Center City Commons =

Complex of buildings in Downtown Orlando

CNL Center
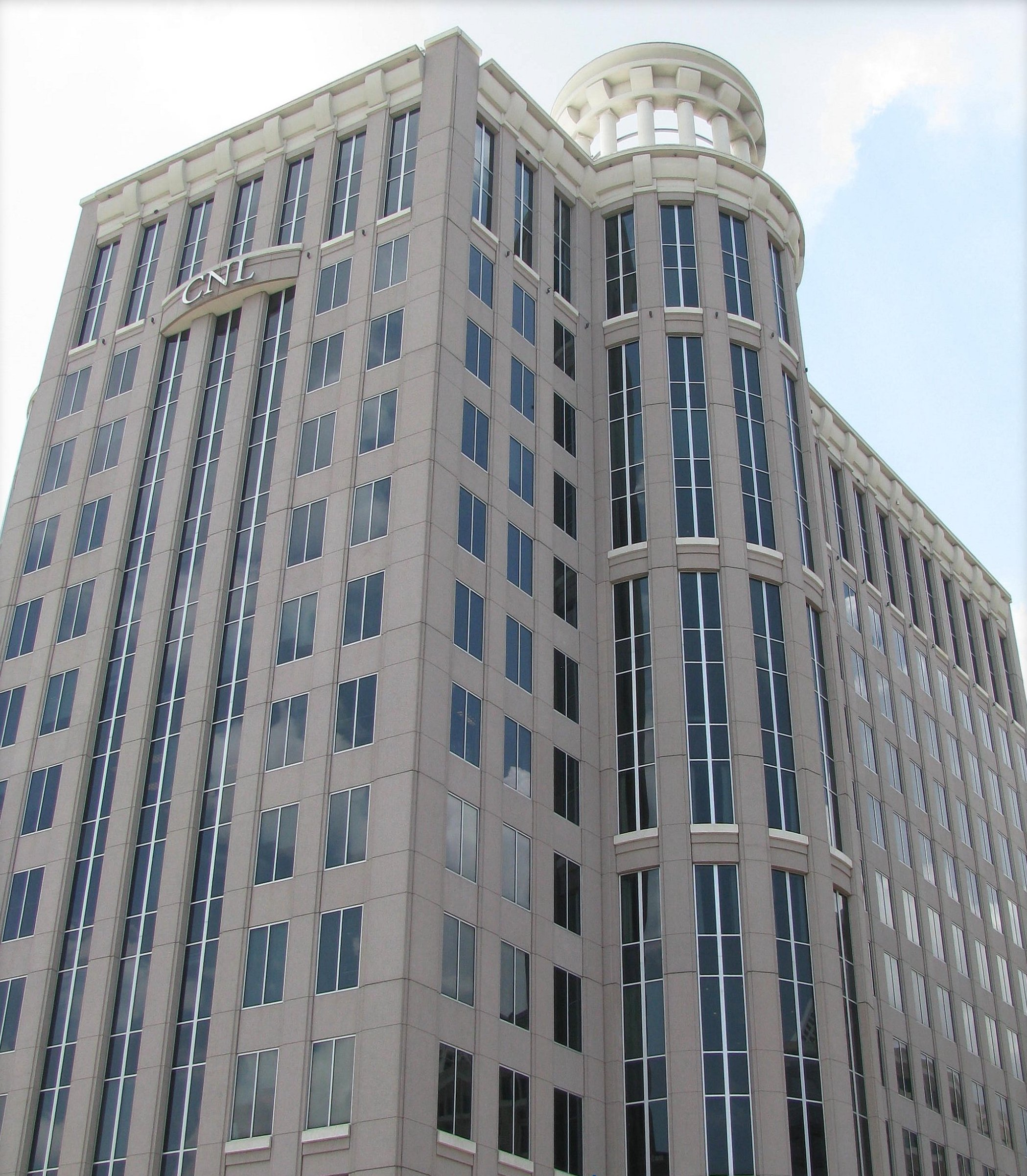
- Interactive map of the CNL Center area

General information
- Type: Office complex
- Location: 450 South Orange Avenue; Orlando, Florida; United States
- Coordinates: 28°32′14″N 81°22′45″W

CNL Center City Commons is a complex of buildings in Downtown Orlando. The main building is a 250 foot tall skyscraper that is the headquarters of CNLBank, Alliance Bankshares before being acquired by the founder of CNL Financial Group. In 2010, its assessed value was $59.6 million.

The complex is also home, and adjacent, to the current Orlando City Hall, which was built after the previous one was demolished in the same area, and filmed for the movie Lethal Weapon 3.
