= Citrus Center =

Commercial office building in Orlando, Florida

BB&T building
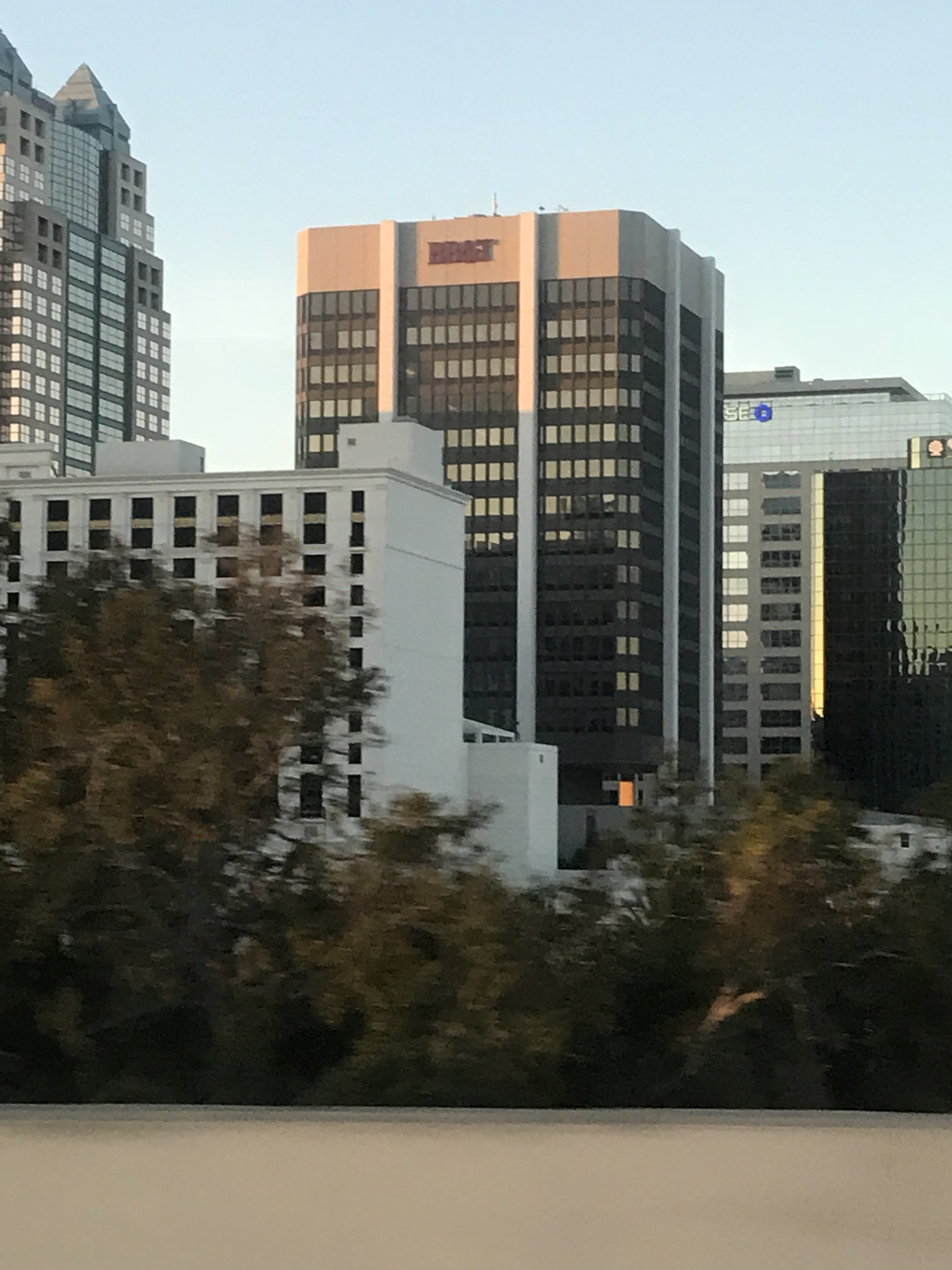

- Location within Florida

General information
- Type: Office
- Location: 255 South Orange Avenue; Orlando, Florida; United States
- Coordinates: 28.5393°N 81.3784°W
- Completed: 1971

Height
- Roof: 281 ft (85.6 m)

Technical details
- Floor count: 19
- Lifts/elevators: 7

Design and construction
- Architects: Reynolds, Smith & Hills

The Citrus Center, also known as the BB&T building, originally known as the CNA Tower, is a commercial office building in Orlando, Florida, United States located at 255 South Orange Avenue. Topped out in December 1970 and completed in April 1971, it was the first modern skyscraper in Orlando. It is 281 feet (85.65 metres) and 19 storeys tall, the first five storeys of which are a parking structure (four totally enclosed and the fifth open save for parapet walls,) with an entrance lobby and some tenants on the first floor. There is an upper mechanical floor of 1 1/2 storeys above Floor 19 but they are not counted as floors. The roof contains a large structure to house electrical power switching circuitry, seven elevator winches (six passenger and one freight) and window-washing equipment (a workers' cradle and davit) mounted on rails.

It became the tallest building in Orlando taking the crown from the First National Bank Building, and kept this crown for sixteen years until the Regions Bank Tower was built in 1986, but it was not eclipsed from view until the new Sun Bank Tower was built across the street in 1988. Originally it was decorated with large, dark-blue translucent letters spelling C N A along the four sides of its parapet top floor, which were illuminated at night in a light blue color; this was for years a feature of the Orlando skyline, visible for fifteen miles by road (and at least 50 miles from the Kennedy Space Center if from a high-enough vantage such as the Vehicle Assembly Building and 22 miles from the Citrus Tower in Clermont, it was also visible from the taller International Drive hotels and Lake Buena Vista and Walt Disney World hotels.) The building contains 1,144 windows on Floors 7 through 19, and it actually has eight faces, the four corner faces being only two windows wide, which makes it an octagon.

The original cost of construction was $8 million. Two workers were killed in its construction, one of which was an iron-worker who fell to his death on the Orange Avenue side a month before the topping-out.

The building is owned by Southwest Value Partners of San Diego, California.

It remains one of the city's tallest buildings.

== See also ==
- List of tallest buildings in Orlando

Records
Preceded by First Green Bank Building	Tallest Building in Orlando; 1971-1986; 85.64m	Succeeded by Regions Bank Building (Orlando, Fl)
