= Bank of America Center (Orlando, Florida) =

404-foot skyscraper in Downtown Orlando

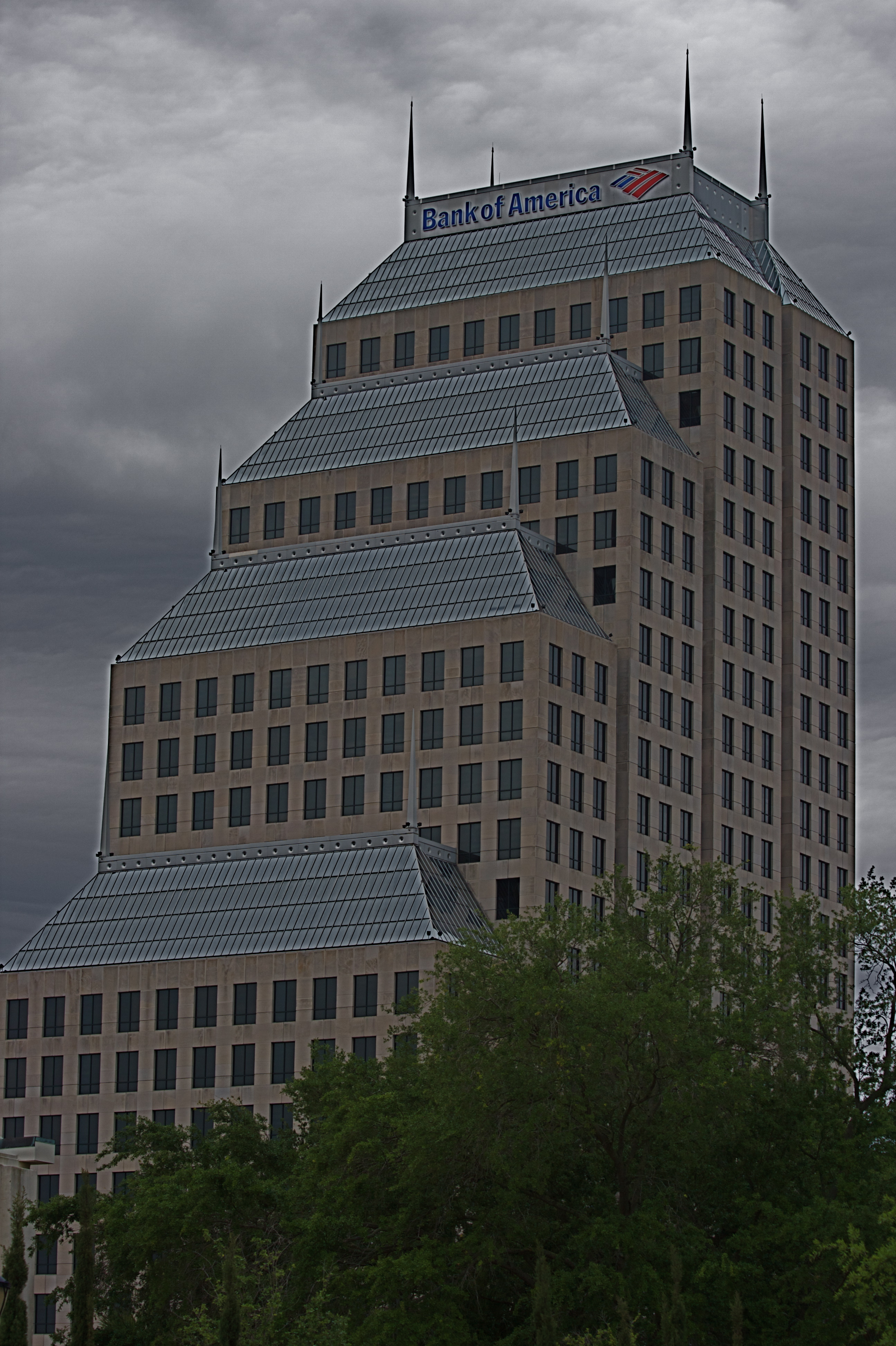
- Former names: Barnett Bank Center, NationsBank at duPont Centre

General information
- Type: Office
- Location: 390 North Orange Avenue; Orlando, Florida; United States
- Construction started: 1985
- Completed: 1988

Height
- Antenna spire: 127.3 m (418 ft)
- Roof: 123.14 m (404.0 ft)

Technical details
- Floor count: 28
- Floor area: 421,203 sq ft (39,131.0 m^{2})

The Bank of America Center is a 404-foot skyscraper in Downtown Orlando.

The building is one of the tallest in the city, and is a unique part of the skyline. The postmodern building was designed by Texas-based Morris-Aubry Architects, who modeled the building after their recently completed One American Center in Austin, Texas. Its collection of 10 spires gives it an almost gothic appearance, and its staircase design makes it similar in appearance to another Bank of America building in Houston. The building was owned by Cousins Properties of Atlanta, Georgia, and sold in January 2018 to Southwest Value Partners based in San Diego, California.

== History ==
April 1985, the Pillar-Bryton Company announced plans and unveiled the model for a new development in downtown Orlando, Florida on a 10-acre site off Orange Avenue named "du Pont Centre", the overall project cost was estimated to be $400 million once completed, with the first building costing $78 million. The announcement was made by the owner of the development company and an Orlando resident which was William DuPont III, heir to the Du Pont family fortune. In 1985, Forbes estimated the 32-year-old heir's wealth to be at least $125 million. William du Pont III later sold the remaining undeveloped property. Bad investments and business deals caused him to also sell his ownership interest in the building in the 1990s.

In September 2009, Eola Capital bought the building as part of its $1.1 billion acquisition of 22 office buildings owned by Miami–based America's Capital Partners. Eola Capital was then merged into Parkway Properties and the building was also purchased as part of the $462 million deal in April 2011.

In January 2018, a San Diego–based real estate firm Southwest Value Partners purchased the building for $81.86 million along with two other downtown Orlando buildings in a package deal valued over $208 million. Later in August that year, the company planned to renovate the building, with HKS, Inc. chosen as the architect.

In January 2020, City National Bank of Florida secured a deal to lease 13,500 square feet (1,250 square metres) of office space in the building. The bank also secured naming rights for the building's signage. The company then moved to the building in the same year and the new signage was installed in June 2020.
