= CNL Financial Group =

American private investment management company

- Founded: 1973
- Headquarters: Orlando, Florida
- Key people: James M. Seneff, Jr. (Executive Chairman)
- Divisions: CNL Healthcare Properties; CNL Commercial Real Estate; CNL Growth Properties; Global Income Trust
- Website: https://www.cnl.com/

CNL Financial Group (CNL), formerly Commercial Net Lease, is an American private investment management and commercial real estate company. It was started in 1973 by James Seneff. The company has been a major player in efforts to redevelop Orlando's downtown. The original CNA tower (the Citrus Center) was downtown Orlando's first modern skyscraper when it was completed in 1971. A new CNL Tower was constructed on the east side of Orange Avenue.

The company invests in and manages commercial real estate, runs Real Estate Investment Trusts (REITs), and invests in private companies. The company's divisions include CNL Commercial Real Estate, CNL Securities Corp., CNL Growth Properties, CNL Healthcare Properties, Global Income Trust and Corporate Capital Trust. In 2013, Florida Trend ranked it as the state's 33rd largest private company. It is frequently covered in the news media for its real estate transactions and has assets of approximately $25 billion. Seneff was inducted into the Horatio Alger Association in 2010.

In 2003, a division of the company bought five hotels with Hilton Hotels for a combined $402 million. CNL sold its hotel holdings in 2007. CNL's REITs owned many major resorts and hotels such as Darien Lake, Frontier City, Elitch Gardens Theme Park, Okemo Mountain, Sugarloaf ski resort, Jiminy Peak, and Magic Springs and Crystal Falls and Wild Waves Theme Park. CNL sold its theme parks and Northstar California ski resort to the real estate investment trust EPR Properties. The remaining ski resorts were sold to Och-Ziff Capital Management.

CNL founder James Seneff purchased a controlling stake in Alliance Bankshares, taking over the company and renaming it CNLBank. The bank was headquartered in the Citrus Center. Valley National Bank acquired CNLBank in 2015.

In 2011, CNL launched CNL Properties Trust. Also in 2011, CNL joined with Kohlberg Kravis Roberts to form an investment company for private corporate debt. Recently CNL sold the Mount Washington Hotel to Omni Mount Washington LLC in December 2015.

CNL donated $10 million to help build the Dr. Phillips Center for the Performing Arts.

== See also ==
- National Retail Properties
