= Aspire Building =

31-story office and residential building overlooking Lake Eola in Orlando, Florida

Aspire Building / One Eleven Building
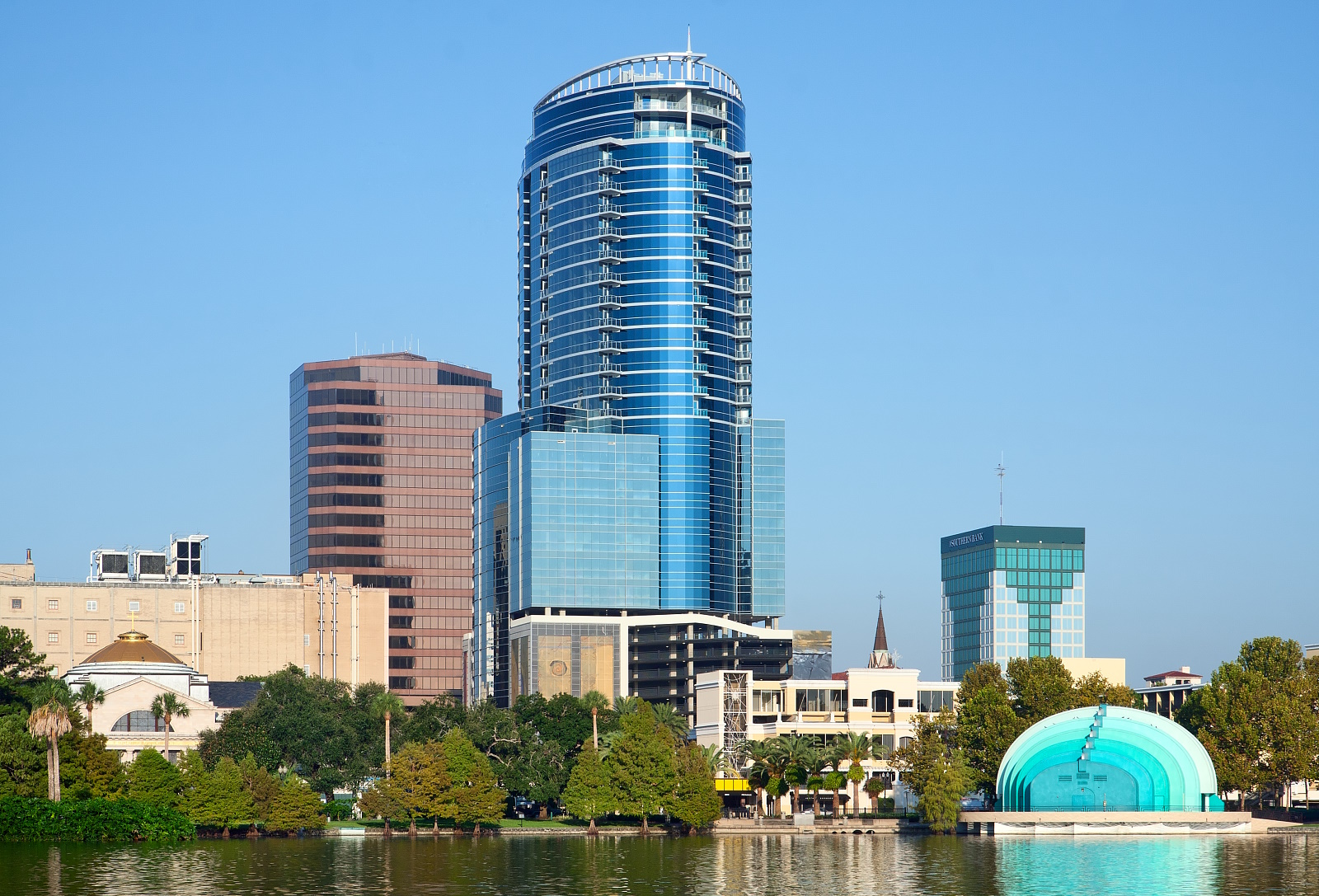
- Interactive map of the Aspire Building / One Eleven Building area

General information
- Location: 111 East Washington Street; Orlando, Florida 32801, United States
- Coordinates: 28°32′37.83″N 81°22′37.38″W
- Construction started: 2006
- Completed: 2008
- Opened: 2008
- Cost: $80 million
- Owner: Lincoln Orlando Holdings, LLC
- Landlord: Lincoln Property Company

Height
- Height: 356 ft (109 m)

Technical details
- Floor count: 31
- Floor area: 559,992 sq ft (52,025.0 m^{2})

Design and construction
- Architecture firm: Baker Barrios Architects, Inc.
- Civil engineer: GAI Consultants

Other information
- Parking: 610 spaces

Aspire Building, also known as the One Eleven Building, is a 31-story office and residential building overlooking Lake Eola in Orlando, Florida. The building was completed in 2008 at a cost of US$80 million and is owned by Lincoln Orlando Holdings.

Construction of the tower was announced in 2004. Dynetech Corporation had planned to occupy part of the building upon its completion and secured the naming rights as marquee tenant. By 2009, Dynetech Corporation was in bankruptcy and the building was renamed as the Aspire Building / One Eleven Building in 2013.

== See also ==
- List of tallest buildings in Orlando
- The VUE at Lake Eola
