= Solaire at the Plaza =

Coordinates: 28.5407°N 81.3778°W

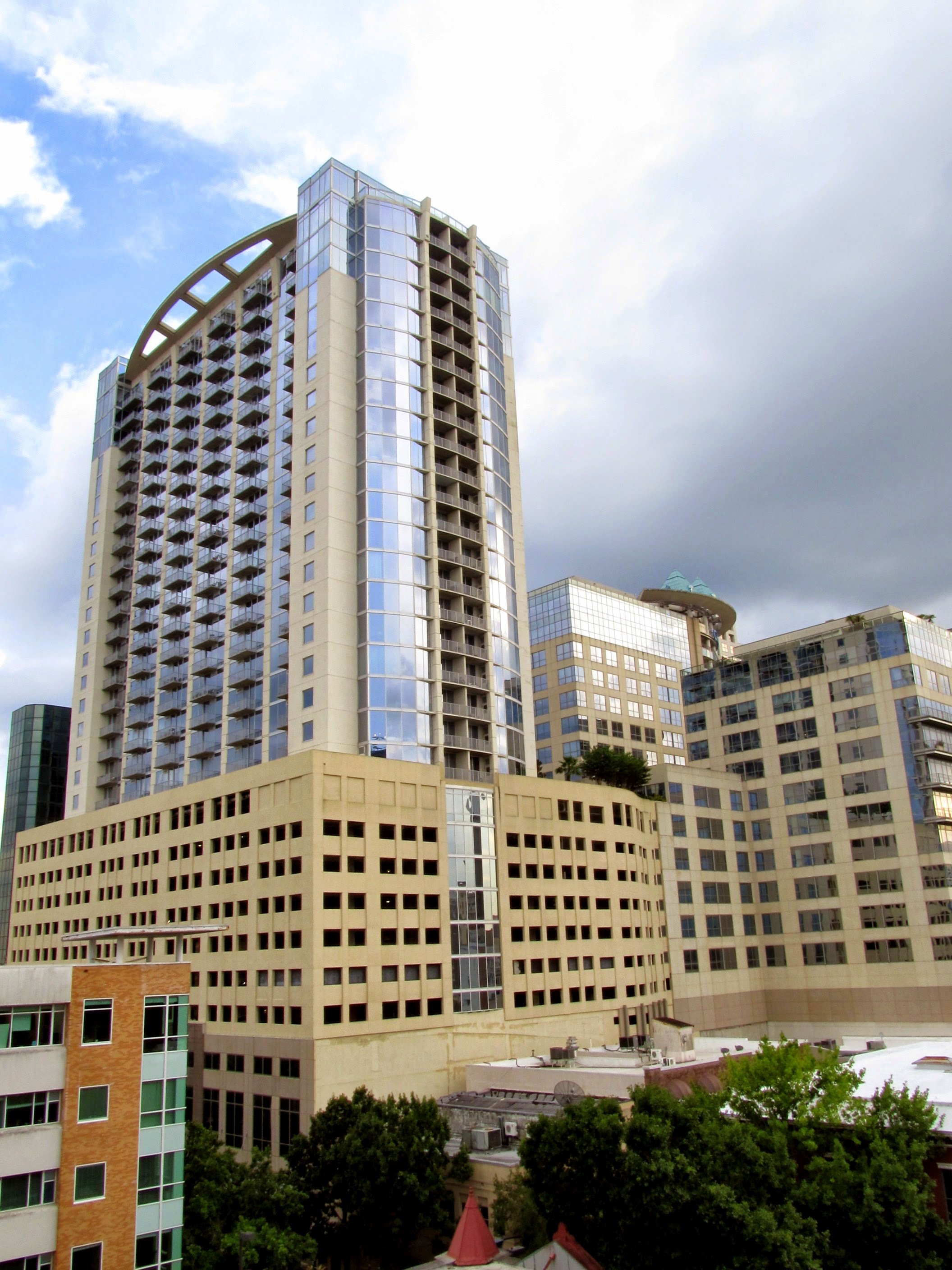
- Interactive map of the Solaire at the Plaza area

General information
- Type: Residential
- Location: 155 South Court Avenue; Orlando, Florida; United States
- Construction started: 2004
- Completed: 2006

Height
- Roof: 359 ft (109.4 m)

Technical details
- Floor count: 30
- Floor area: 280,852 sq ft (26,092.0 m^{2})

Design and construction
- Architect: The Preston Partnership
- Structural engineer: Echelon Engineering

Other information
- Parking: 1,600

Solaire at the Plaza is a residential tower in Downtown Orlando. The tower is directly above the Premier Trade Plaza. Both were built at exactly the same time and have similar design. The building, like much of the other towers, has a crown that is lit at night. The tower created a dense pocket of buildings in the area around Suntrust Center, and now is a major turning point in the skyline of Orlando. The tower is the seventh tallest building in Orlando as of 2010, standing at 359 feet and is 30 stories tall.

== See also ==
- List of tallest buildings in Orlando
