= Lake Lorna Doone Park =

Park in Orange County, Florida, United States

Coordinates: 28.5411°N 81.4004°W

Lake Lorna Doone Park is a 12-acre park located in the between the neighborhoods of Westfield and Parramore in Orlando, Florida. The physical address is 1519 West Church Street, just to the north of Camping World Stadium. After undergoing an $8 million dollar renovation in 2021, Lake Lorna Doone Park is now the "Jewel of the West Side".

On August 9, 1955, Lake Lorna Doone Park hosted the first integrated Little League Baseball game to ever be played in the south.

The Pensacola Jaycees were declared winners of their local district by Little League headquarters in Williamsport, Pennsylvania after local officials refused to allow them to play against the all-white teams. Pensacola advanced to the Florida State Tournament which was held at Lake Lorna Doone Park. Pensacola drew a bye in the first round of the six-team state championship series and lost to host Orlando in the second round, 5-0.

The 1955 season was the first after US Supreme Court rulings had eliminated "separate but equal" conditions in the nation's schools and public parks. Florida State Little League and City of Orlando officials fully cooperated with Little League headquarters in Williamsport, Pennsylvania to support the playing of the game. By all accounts, the game was played without incident and newspapers reported that the hometown crowd cheered the visiting team and offered words of encouragement. This was in stark contrast to South Carolina, where state and local officials refused to allow their state tournament to be played because of the presence of an African-American team, and forfeited sending a state representative to their regional tournament.

In 1963, Lake Lorna Doone Park once again hosted the Florida State Little League Tournament.

In 2021, Lake Lorna Doone Park underwent an $8 million dollar renovation including a new walking loop, fitness stations, a pavilion, inclusive playground, basketball courts, covered seating, and a water spray park.
