= 200 South Orange =

American skyscraper located in the Central Business District of Orlando, Florida

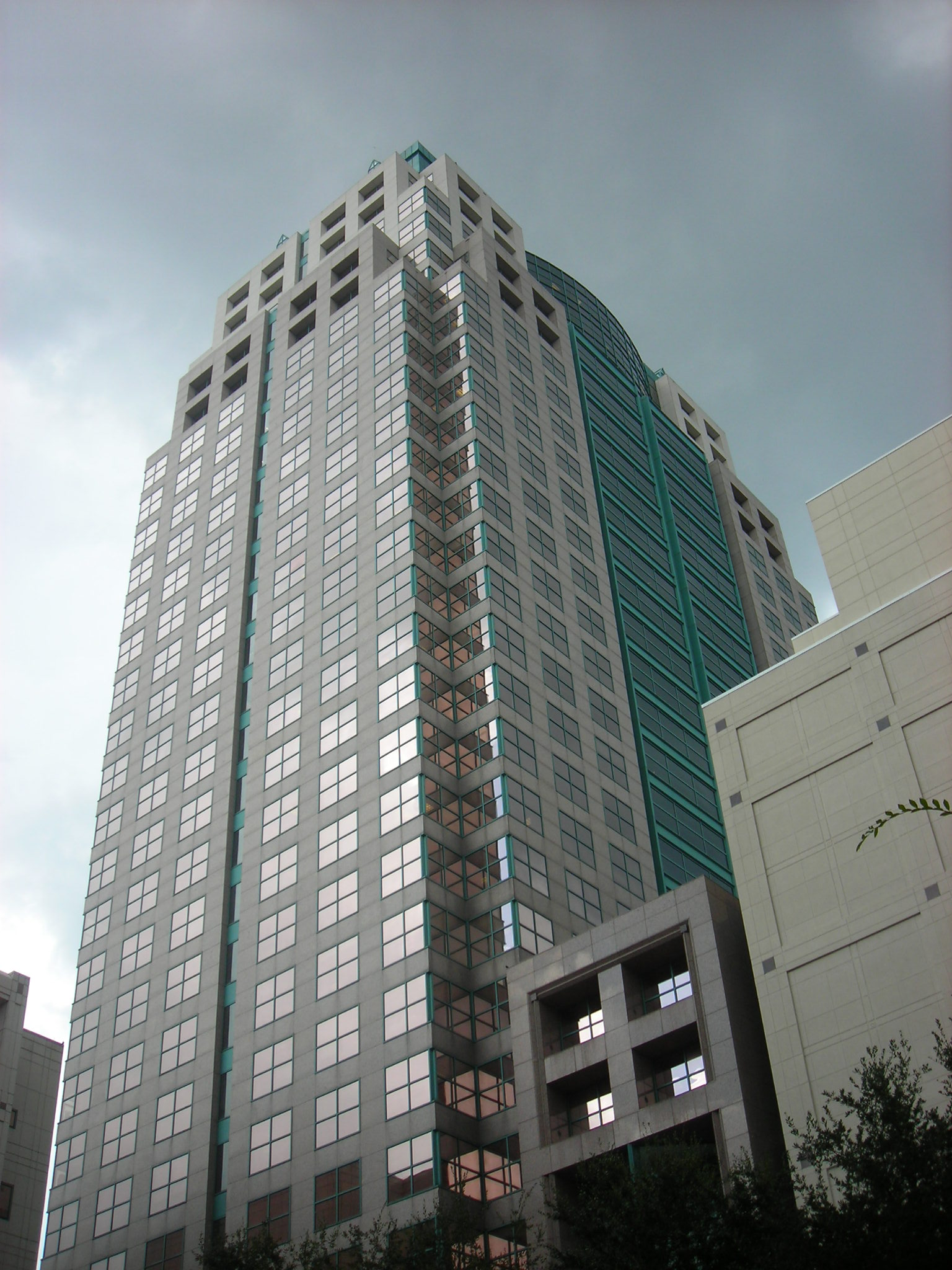

General information
- Type: Office
- Location: 200 South Orange Avenue; Orlando, Florida; United States
- Coordinates: 28.5398°N 81.3799°W
- Completed: 1988
- Cost: $100 million ($272 million in 2025 dollars)
- Owner: Piedmont Office Realty Trust
- Operator: Piedmont Operating Partnership

Height
- Roof: 441 ft (134.4 m)

Technical details
- Floor count: 35
- Floor area: 654,678 sq ft (60,822 m^{2})
- Lifts/elevators: 31

Design and construction
- Architects: Skidmore Owings and Merrill

200 South Orange, formerly known as the SunTrust Center and Sun Bank Center, is a skyscraper located in the Central Business District of Orlando, Florida. Rising to 441 ft (134.4 m), it is the tallest multi-story building in Orlando and Central Florida outside of Tampa and St. Petersburg. Completed in 1988, it has 35 stories and 30 floors of usable office space. Originally named the Sun Bank Center, the name changed after SunTrust Banks began its series of mergers and acquisitions in the 1990s. It was originally built to serve as the Florida headquarters for SunTrust Banks, but as recently as 2009, SunTrust has vacated over 150,000 square feet (14,000 m^{2}) in an effort to downsize.

== Details ==
Designed in contemporary postmodern style, the building has a beige and green color scheme accented in blue hues. There are 35 stories with 30 floors of usable office space. The tower has a six-level parking garage and its lobby is an eight-story atrium. The building is topped with four green pyramids and the upper five stories is actually one large floor that provides panoramic views of Orlando and the surrounding area. However, this floor is not open to the general public. A pre-existing skyscraper is integrated in the center's design. This original building, which was re-faced during the 1987-1988 construction of the main tower, was the original First National Bank at Orlando. This original building was built in 1958–1960. Later the building was renovated to suit SunTrust, the windows were changed individually instead of keeping the windows a stripe, and was the first of six branch banks of what would become Sun Bank, and then later SunTrust. The building name has changed from SunTrust Center to 200 South Orange due to the move out of the company. They relocated to the nearby 28-floor "SunTrust Plaza at Church Street Station" office building on the corner of Garland Avenue and South Street in 2020.

The evening lighting scheme provides amber illumination on the four pyramids and white illumination on the upper floors. There is a restaurant on the ground level of the building. The tower is home to the consulates of Argentina and the trade offices of Qingdao, China.

While there is no official height limit for a skyscraper in Orlando, any building planned with significant height requires the approval of the Federal Aviation Administration. This is because of overlapping flight paths between Orlando International Airport and Orlando Executive Airport, which caused the latter to be assigned to the lower flight levels, and also due to their close proximity to downtown Orlando. As a result, 200 South Orange has remained the tallest building in Orlando since 1988.

== In popular culture ==
The building is featured in both the book and film versions of Paper Towns, a novel by John Green. In the story, protagonist Quentin Jacobsen and Margo, his love interest, ascend the tower at night to take in the view of Orlando. During the scene Margo declares the city to be a "paper town."

Records
Preceded by Regions Bank Building (Orlando, Fl)	Tallest Building in Orlando; 1988—Present; 134m	Succeeded by None
