= Draper Tower =

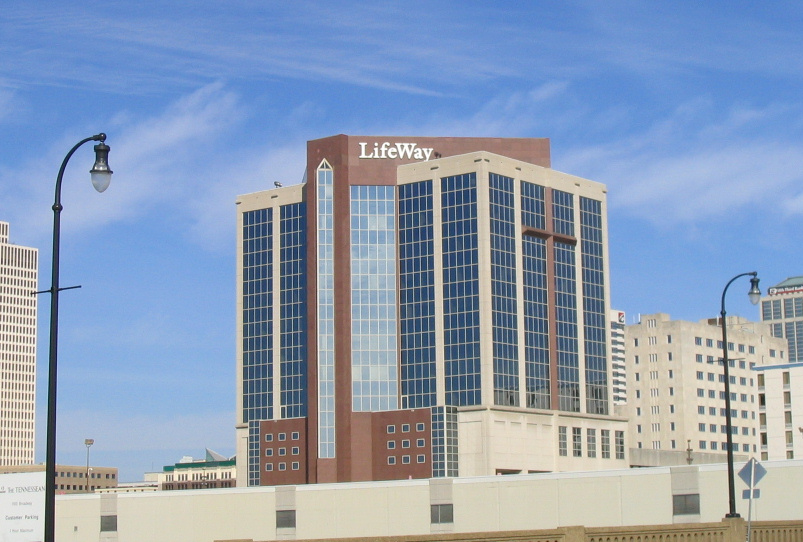
- The Draper Tower in 2009
- Interactive map of the Draper Tower area
- Alternative names: Centennial Tower, LifeWay Tower

General information
- Status: Demolished
- Location: 117 10th Avenue North, Nashville, Tennessee, United States
- Coordinates: 36°9′33″N 86°47′7″W
- Construction started: 1989
- Completed: 1990
- Inaugurated: 1991
- Demolished: January 6, 2018
- Cost: $15.5 million

Height
- Height: 212 feet (65 meters)

Technical details
- Floor count: 12

The Draper Tower (also known as Centennial Tower and LifeWay Tower) was a high-rise building in Nashville, Tennessee. It was built from 1989 to 1990, and inaugurated in 1991. The building was demolished in 2018.

== History ==
Draper Tower was built in 1989–1990, at a cost of $15.5 million. It was designed in the Modernist architectural style. It was dedicated in 1991.

The building stood next to the Sullivan Tower, and it was an expansion of the headquarters of LifeWay Christian Resources. It was formally named after James T. Draper Jr., the president of LifeWay Christian Resources from 1991 to 2006, but it was commonly known as Centennial Tower.

The tower was demolished via implosion on January 6, 2018, by Southwest Value Partners, a real estate development company based in San Diego, California. The company is expected to develop part of the Nashville Yards where the tower stood.

LifeWay Christian Resources moved its headquarters to the Capitol View area.
