= Southwest Value Partners =

American real estate company

- Type: Private
- Industry: Real estate
- Founded: 1990
- Headquarters: San Diego, California, US
- Key people: Mark Schlossberg; Cary Mack
- Number of employees: 43 (2023)
- Website: swvp.com

Southwest Value Partners (SWVP) is an American, privately held real estate investment company. It is headquartered in San Diego, with offices in Scottsdale, Tucson and Nashville.

In June 2025, SWVP ranked 111th in Private Equity International's PERE 200 ranking among the world’s largest real estate managers.

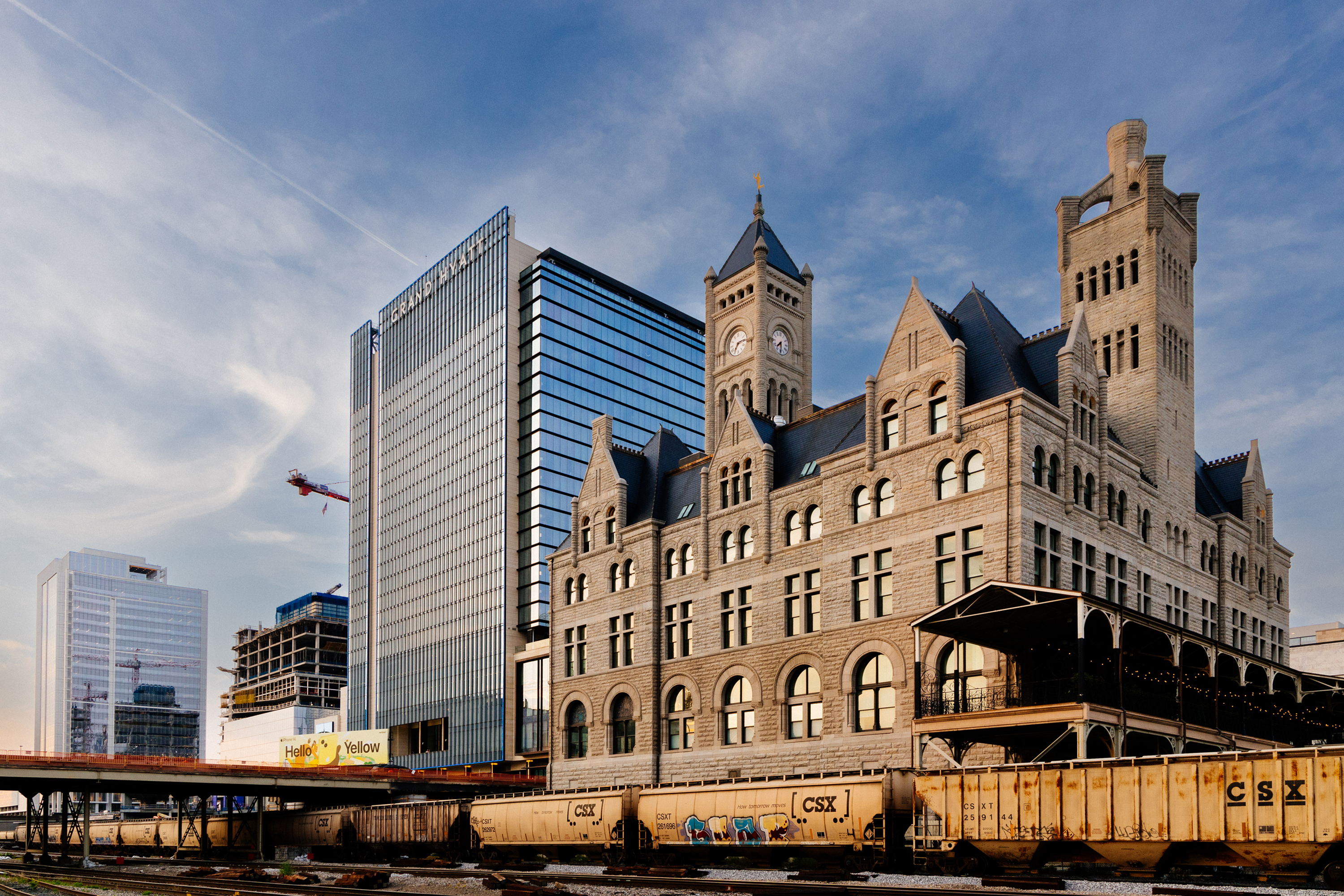
Grand Hyatt Nashville, one of SWVP’s projects, behind Union Station.

== History ==
SWVP was founded in 1990. The company is owned and co-managed by Mark Schlossberg and Cary Mack.

In 1995, SWVP acquired both the Emerald Plaza and the Comerica Bank building in San Diego, California.

By 1997, the company had acquired the First National Bank building and controlled nearly 30% of the Class A office space in downtown San Diego. In 2004, SWVP sold the Emerald Plaza and two other San Diego office buildings to Santa Ana real estate firm Triple Net Properties for $274.5 million.

In 2012, SWVP acquired the Westin Hilton Head Island Resort & Spa and Westin La Paloma Resort and Spa out of bankruptcy. SWVP announced renovations in excess of $60 million to both hotels. In 2015, SWVP acquired the 15-acre LifeWay campus in Nashville, Tennessee. SWVP is redeveloping the campus as Nashville Yards.

In 2016, SWVP acquired the Marriott Del Mar in San Diego, California. In December 2017, SWVP bought the Bank of America Center and two other towers in downtown Orlando, Florida from Cousins Properties for more than $200 million. In June 2020, SWVP confirmed it had reached a deal to acquire the Union Station Hotel in Nashville.

In 2020, SWVP acquired both the DoubleTree Resort by Hilton Paradise Valley and the Hilton Scottsdale Resort & Villas. In July 2023, it sold the DoubleTree Resort Paradise Valley to Global Hospitality Investment Group for $115.5 million. In 2025, SWVP sold the historic Frost building in Nashville, Tennessee.

== Notable Investments ==
=== Nashville Yards ===
SWVP is the owner and developer of Nashville Yards, an 18-acre mixed-use development at the gateway to Nashville's central business district. Nashville Yards is bordered by the two main traffic corridors into downtown Nashville – Broadway and Church Street.

In 2018, SWVP demolished the Draper Tower and the Sullivan Tower in Nashville, Tennessee to develop Nashville Yards, the site of Amazon's projected Operations Center of Excellence. In August 2019, SVP "made a meaningful financial commitment on a multiyear basis" to the Susan G. Komen Breast Cancer Foundation, with relevant events planned at Nashville Yards.

When complete, Nashville Yards will contain more than 3 million square feet of Class A and creative office space, 2,000 residential units, 365,000 square feet of retail, food and beverage, and entertainment space, 1,000 hotel rooms, 80,000 square feet group and convention meeting space, a 4,500 capacity music and event venue, and 7+ acres of activated open space.

Nashville Yards tenants and brand partnerships include Amazon, Anschutz Entertainment Group, Ascension Saint Thomas, Gallagher, Pinnacle Financial Partners, Bass Berry & Sims, Grand Hyatt, Marriott, Susan G. Komen, Sean Brock, Starbucks, The Goddard School and others.

In partnership with AEG, SWVP co-developed The Pinnacle, a 4,500-occupant live music and event venue, and a 415,000 square foot creative office and retail building at Nashville Yards.

=== Grand Hyatt Nashville ===
Grand Hyatt Nashville was opened to guests by SWVP in October, 2020. The hotel is Nashville's third largest with 591 guest rooms, 77,000 square feet of meeting space and event facilities, two full-service restaurants, seven bars, a spa, and an outdoor pool with entertainment deck. In October 2021, Hyatt named SWVP the Developer of the Year in recognition of the work advancing the Grand Hyatt Nashville. Grand Hyatt Nashville has been voted Best New Hotel in the United States by USA Today (2020) and voted Best Hotel in Nashville by Nashville Scene (2022). The Grand Hyatt Nashville was voted the 2023 top meeting hotel in North America by Cvent and hosted the 2023 SEC Media Days, and in 2025, the hotel hosted the 2025 CAA World Congress of Sports.

=== The Union Station Nashville Yards ===
In July 2020, SWVP acquired the Union Station hotel, a 125-room hotel in Nashville, TN. In 2023, SWVP completed a major renovation of the hotel’s guest rooms and suites, drawing inspiration from the building’s past as a train station.

=== The Pinnacle ===
In February 2025, AEG and SWVP opened The Pinnacle, a 4,500-capacity venue located at Nashville Yards. The inaugural event of the venue featured a performance by Kacey Musgraves.

== Notable Investment Activity ==
=== 1990 - 1999 ===
- In 1995, SWVP acquired Emerald Plaza in San Diego, CA.
- In 1995, SWVP acquired the Comerica Bank building in San Diego, CA.
- In 1997, SWVP acquired the First National Bank building in San Diego, CA.

=== 2000 - 2009 ===
- In 2000, SWVP acquired Park Tower in Long Beach, CA.
- In 2004, SWVP sold three downtown San Diego office buildings for $274 million.
- In 2005, SWVP sold the Del Amo Financial Center in Torrance, California for $68 million.
- In 2008, SWVP acquired land planned for 3,439 single-family residences in Phoenix, Arizona.

=== 2010 - 2019 ===
- In 2010, SWVP acquired 4,508 acres of land in Arizona.
- In 2012, SWVP acquired the Westin Hilton Head Resort & Spa and Westin La Paloma Resort & Spa.
- In 2013, SWVP acquired the InterContinental New Orleans.
- In 2014, SWVP acquired Continuum office park in Chandler, Arizona.
- In 2015, SWVP acquired the Lifeway campus in Nashville, Tennessee, being re-developed as Nashville Yards.
- In 2016, SWVP acquired the Marriott Del Mar in San Diego, California.
- In 2018, SWVP acquired the Warner Center Marriott Woodland Hills.

=== 2020 - present ===
- In 2020, SWVP acquired the DoubleTree Resort by Hilton Paradise Valley and the Hilton Scottsdale Resort & Villas. In July 2023, SWVP sold the DoubleTree Resort Paradise Valley to Global Hospitality Investment Group for $115.5 million.
- In 2020, SWVP acquired the Union Station hotel in Nashville, Tennessee.
- In 2021, SWVP acquired Continuum Alpharetta in Alpharetta, Georgia.
- In 2022, SWVP acquired the JW Marriott Houston Downtown in Houston, Texas.
- In 2023, SWVP acquired the JW Marriott Tucson Starr Pass Resort & Spa in Tucson, Arizona.
- In 2025, SWVP sold the historic Frost building in Nashville, Tennessee.
