= Engel scale =

Religious scale

The Engel scale was developed by James F. Engel, as a way of representing the journey from no knowledge of God, through to spiritual maturity as a Christian believer. The model is used by some Christians to emphasise the process of conversion and the various decision-making steps that a person goes through in becoming a Christian.

== Background ==
The original model was developed by James F. Engel and Viggo Søgaard. It was later refined by Engel, who added several ideas from behavioural science, and published it in his 1975 book with W.F. Norton What's Gone Wrong With the Harvest and 1979 publication Contemporary Christian Communications.

== Model ==
The model emphasises the journey of faith and spiritual maturity through a number of stages.

     +5 Stewardship
    +4 Communion with God
   +3 Conceptual and behavioral growth
  +2 Incorporation into Body
 +1 Post-decision evaluation
New birth
 -1 Repentance and faith in Christ
  -2 Decision to act
   -3 Personal problem recognition
    -4 Positive attitude towards Gospel
     -5 Grasp implications of Gospel
      -6 Awareness of fundamentals of Gospel
       -7 Initial awareness of Gospel
        -8 Awareness of supreme being, no knowledge of Gospel

Two possible additional stages before stage eight could be: -9 Unawareness of supreme being. -10 Resistance or antagonism to the concept of a supreme being.

== Criticism and development ==
The Engel scale has been criticized for its fixed linear approach, which has led to a number of modifications. Søgaard developed the Engel Scale into a two dimensional model in 1986. The Gray Matrix, another two dimensional model produced by Frank Gray of Feba Radio, and Thom S. Rainer's Faith Scale are both also derived from it.

== See also ==
- Conversion to Christianity
- Evangelism
- Missiology
- Romans Road

== Bibliography ==
- Engel, James F. (1979). Contemporary Christian Communications: Its Theory and Practice. New York NY: Thomas. ISBN 0-84075-152-4.
- Engel, James F.; Norton, H. Wilbert (1975). What's Gone Wrong with the Harvest?: A Communication Strategy for the Church and World Evangelization. Grand Rapids MI: Zondervan. ISBN 0-31024-161-8.
- Hartman, David L. (2007). "Implementation of the Personal Styles of Evangelism in the Highland Seventh-day Adventist Church for Maximal Evangelistic Impact". Human Subject Research Archive. 8.
- Hazelden, Paul (2000). "The Modified Engel Scale". hazelden.org.uk.
- Love, Richard D. (2000). "Conversion". In Moreau, A. Scott; Netland, Harold A.; van Engen, Charles Edward (eds.). Evangelical Dictionary of World Missions. Grand Rapids MI: Baker Books. pp. 231–232. ISBN 0-85364-995-2.
- Søgaard, Viggo B. (2000). "Engel Scale". In Moreau, A. Scott; Netland, Harold A.; van Engen, Charles Edward (eds.). Evangelical Dictionary of World Missions. Grand Rapids MI: Baker Books. p. 311. ISBN 0-85364-995-2.
