= Frost Building (Nashville, Tennessee) =

Historic building in Tennessee, United States

- U.S. National Register of Historic Places
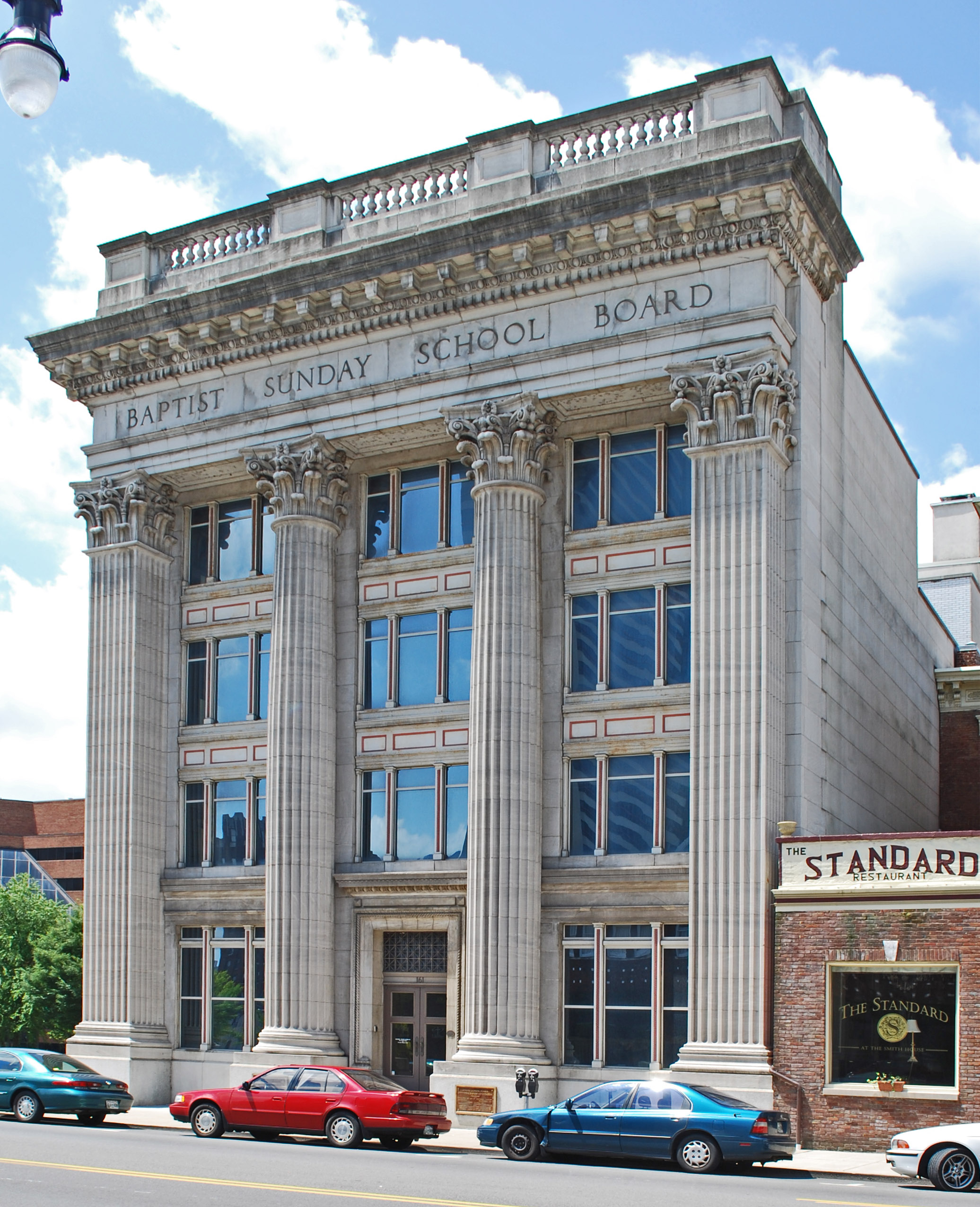
- The Frost Building in 2010

- Location within Tennessee Location within the United States
- Location: 161 8th Avenue North, Nashville, Tennessee, U.S.
- Coordinates: 36°9′38″N 86°47′0″W
- Area: less than one acre
- Built: 1913
- Built by: Selden Breck
- Architect: Hart-Gardner
- Architectural style: Classical Revival
- NRHP reference No.: 80003791
- Added to NRHP: November 25, 1980

The Frost Building is a historic building in Nashville, Tennessee, USA. It was built in the 1910s for the Southern Baptist Convention.

== Location ==
The building is located at 161 8th Avenue North in Nashville, the county seat of Davidson County, Tennessee, USA. It stands to the left of the Savage House, another historic building listed on the NRHP.

== History ==
The four-story building was completed in 1913. It was constructed with gray granite. It was designed in the Neoclassical architectural style. It was built as a Sunday school and publishing house for the Southern Baptist Convention. The building was named in honor of Dr James Marion Frost, a Southern Baptist preacher.

In 1979, the building was renovated by the Baptist Sunday School Board, and in 1993, the firm of Hart Freeland Roberts used photographs to restore the office of Dr. Frost.

== Architectural significance ==
It has been listed on the National Register of Historic Places since November 25, 1980.
