= James Marion Frost =

American Baptist preacher (1848–1916)

- Born: February 10, 1848; Georgetown, Kentucky, U.S.
- Died: October 30, 1916 (aged 68); Nashville, Tennessee, U.S.
- Resting place: Cave Hill Cemetery; Louisville, Kentucky, U.S.
- Education: Georgetown College
- Spouse: Nannie Riley
- Children: 4

James Marion Frost (February 10, 1848 - October 30, 1916) was an American Baptist preacher. He was the founder of the Baptist Sunday School Board, later known as LifeWay Christian Resources, and the author of several books.

== Early life ==
Frost was born on February 10, 1848, in Georgetown, Kentucky. He graduated from Georgetown College.

== Career ==
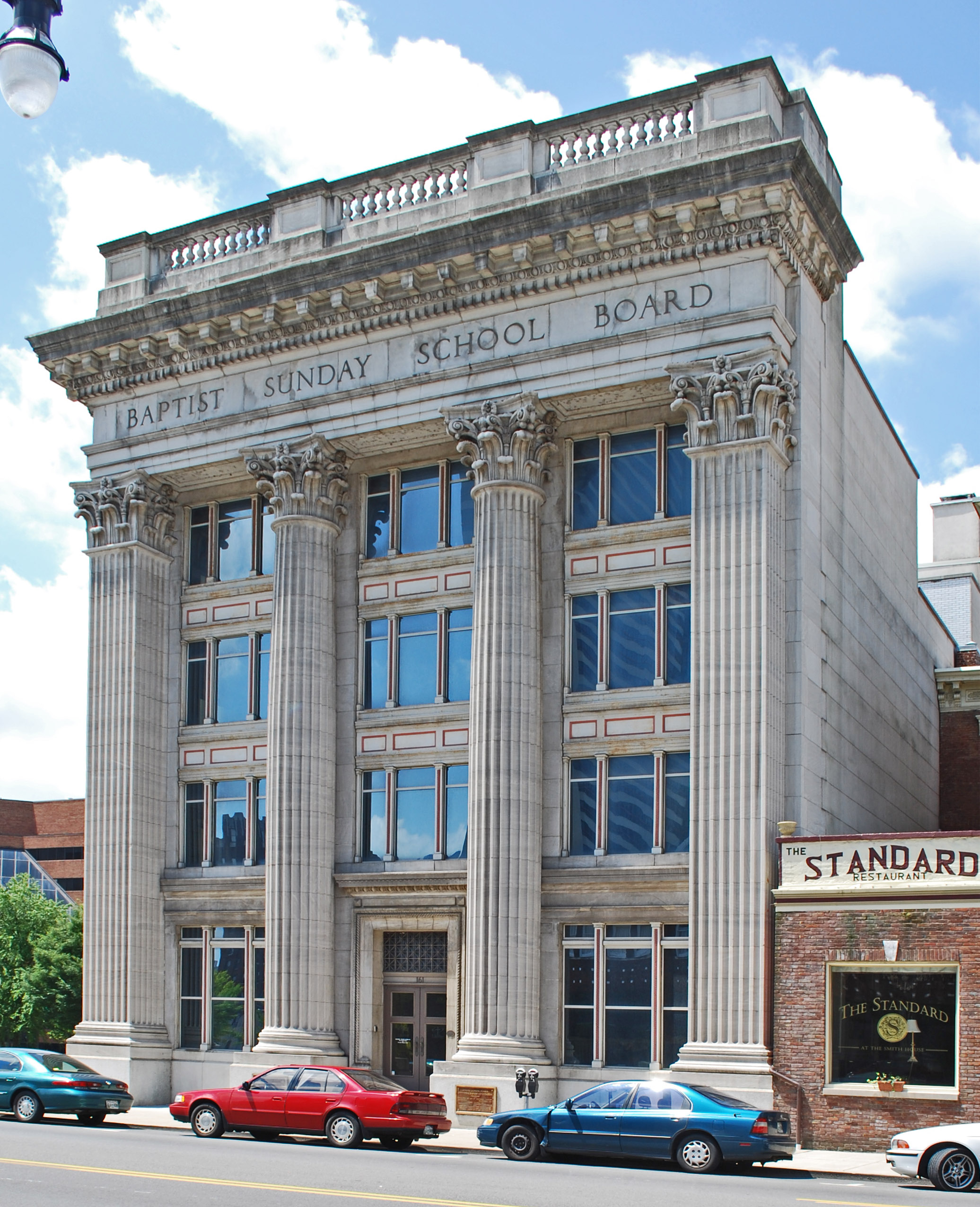
The Frost Building in Nashville, Tennessee.

Frost was a Baptist minister in Lexington and Covington, Kentucky; Staunton and Richmond, Virginia; and Selma, Alabama. He served as the minister of the First Baptist Church of Nashville for three years. He was conservative and disapproved of "liberal" Baptists.

Frost founded the Baptist Sunday School Board of the Southern Baptist Convention in Nashville in 1891. He served as its president until his death. The BSSB moved into the Frost Building upon its completion in 1913.

Frost was the author of many books, which became "classics in the religious literarture" according to the Brooklyn Daily Eagle. He was awarded an honorary LL.D. from his alma mater, Georgetown College, as well as from Baylor University.

== Personal life, death and legacy ==
Frost married Nannie Riley, whose cousin was author James Whitcomb Riley. They had three sons (Howard, Marlon and Marcellus) and a daughter (Margaret). They resided at 2017 Terrace Place in Nashville.

Frost died on October 30, 1916, in Nashville, at age 68. Notable pallbearers at his funeral held at the First Baptist Church of Nashville included Eugene C. Lewis, Christopher Columbus Slaughter and Edward Bushrod Stahlman, and he was buried in the Cave Hill Cemetery in Louisville, Kentucky.

The Baptist Sunday School Board changed its name to LifeWay Christian Resources.

== Selected works ==
- Frost, J. M. (1905). Moral Dignity of Baptism. Nashville, Tenn., Sunday school board, Southern Baptist convention.
- Frost, J. M. (1908). Memorial Supper. Nashville, Tennessee, Sunday school board, Southern Baptist Convention.
- Frost, J. M. (1911). School of the Church.
