= Conversion to Christianity =

Conversion of a previously non-Christian person to Christianity

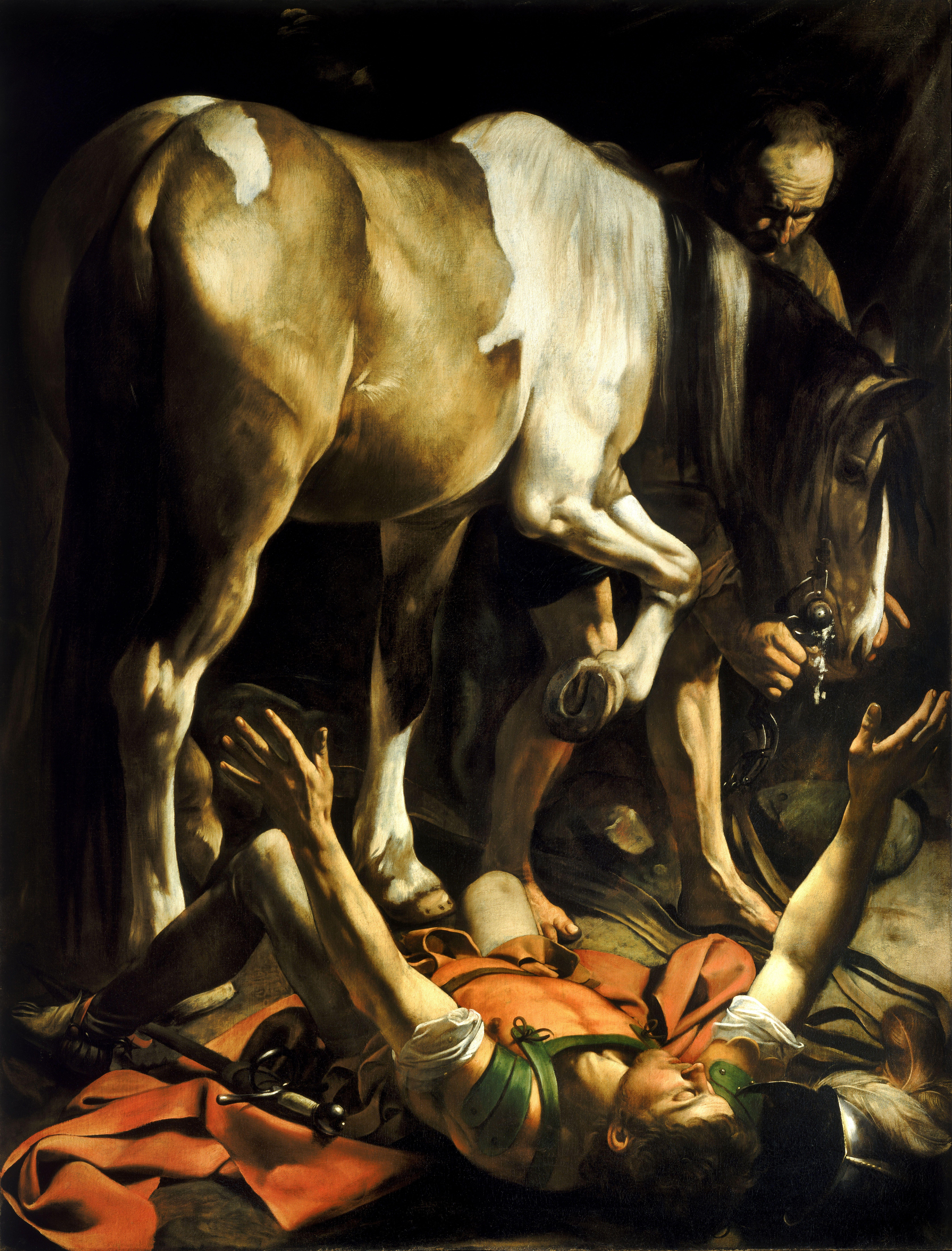
Conversion on the Way to Damascus (1601) by Caravaggio (Santa Maria del Popolo, Rome) depicts the conversion of Paul the Apostle to Christianity according to the events narrated in the ninth chapter of the Book of Acts (Acts 9:1–22)

Conversion to Christianity is the religious conversion of a previously non-Christian person that brings about changes in what sociologists refer to as the convert's "root reality" including their social behaviors, thinking and ethics. The sociology of religion indicates religious conversion was an important factor in the spread of Christianity and the making of the modern world. Conversion is the most studied aspect of religion by psychologists of religion, but there is still very little actual data available.

Christianity is growing rapidly in the global South and East, primarily through conversion. Different methods of conversion have been practiced historically. There is evidence of coercion by secular leaders in the Early and Late Middle Ages, though coercion as a method has never been approved or even supported by any majority of Christian theologians.

Different Christian denominations may perform various different kinds of rituals or ceremonies of initiation into their community of believers. The primary ritual of conversion is baptism, while different denominations differ with regard to confirmation.

According to a 2001 study by religion professor David B. Barrett of Columbia University and historian George Thomas Kurian, approximately 2.7 million people were converted to Christianity that year from another religion, while approximately 3.8 million people overall were converting annually. In the first decades of the twenty-first century, Pentecostalism is the largest and fastest growing form of Christianity; this growth is primarily due to religious conversion.

== Individual conversion ==
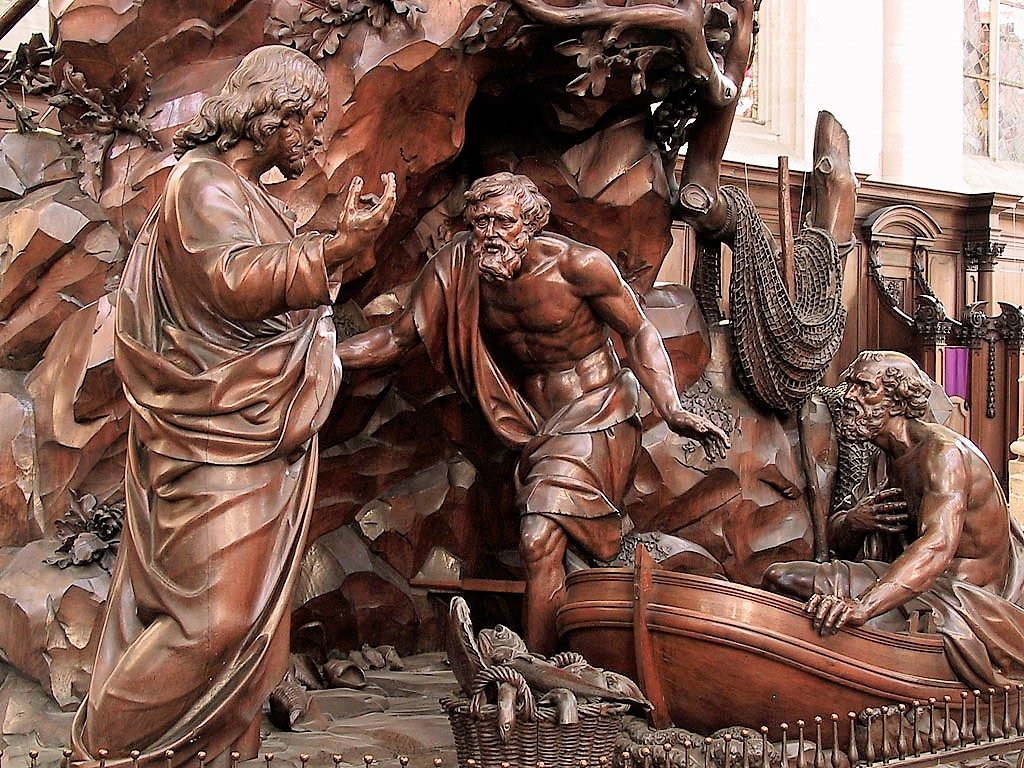
Jan Frans van Geel and Jan Baptist van Hool – The calling of St. Peter and St. Andrew, detail of the pulpit in the St. Andrew's Church, Antwerp

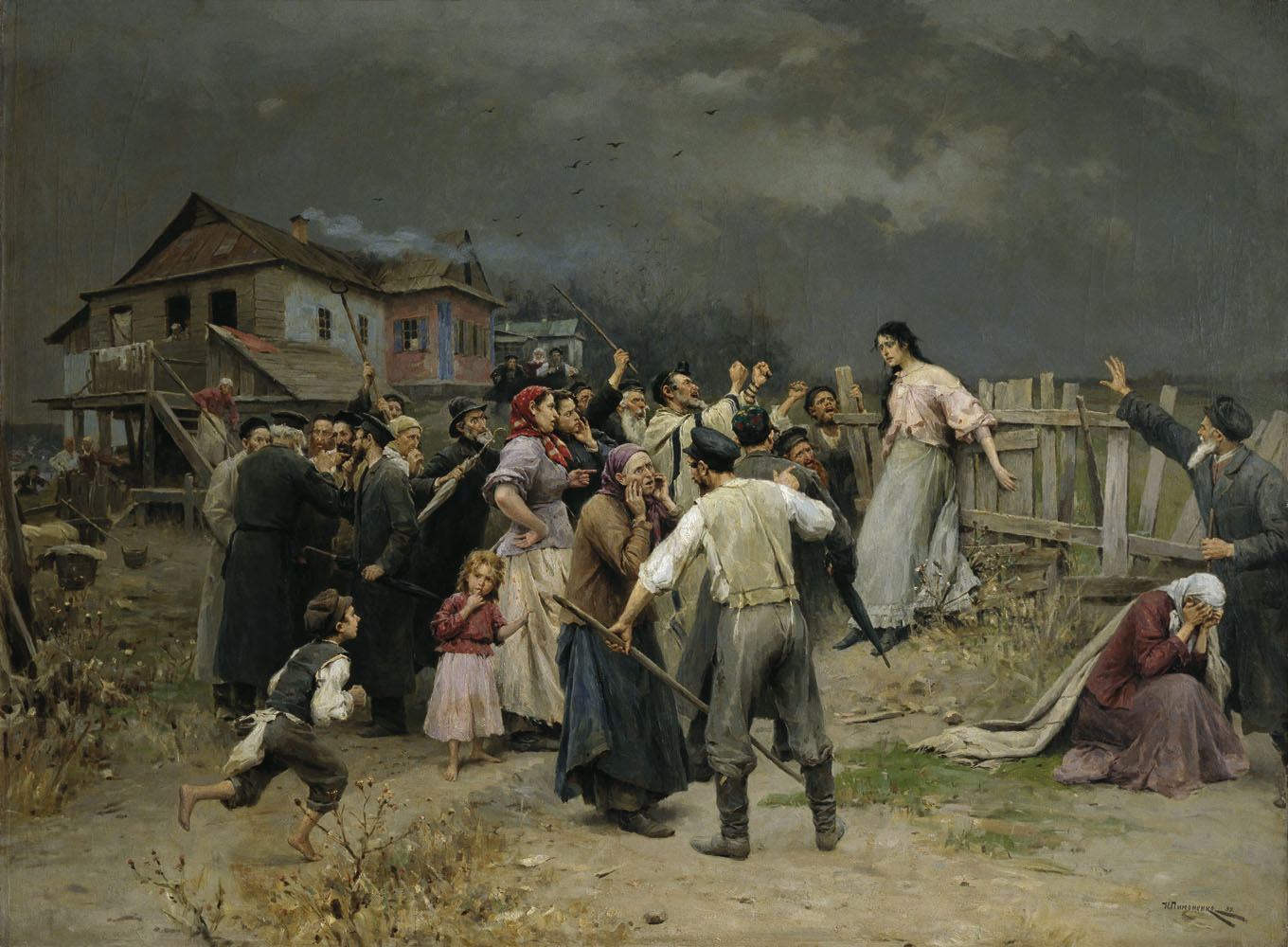
A Victim of Fanaticism (1899) by Mykola Pymonenko. A convert is often unwelcome by the adherents of the former faith.

James P. Hanigan writes that individual conversion is the foundational experience and the central message of Christianity, adding that Christian conversion begins with an experience of being "thrown off balance" through cognitive and psychological "disequilibrium", followed by an "awakening" of consciousness and a new awareness of God. Hanigan compares it to "death and rebirth, a turning away..., a putting off of the old..., a change of mind and heart". The person responds by acknowledging and confessing personal lostness and sinfulness, and then accepting a call to holiness thus restoring balance. This initial internal conversion is followed by practices that further the process of conversion, which according to Hanigan, will include ethical changes.

In examples of conversion from the New Testament, such as Peter's conversion and Paul's, Hanigan perceives this same common "death and rebirth" experience. He says these individuals did not respond out of a sense of guilt, but from awe, reverence, and holy fear of what they perceived as God's presence. Comparative studies of the early twenty-first century offer the insight that religious conversion provides a new locus of self-definition, moral authority and social identity through the acceptance of religious actions that seem more fitting and true to the recipient.

Religious conversion into Christianity sometimes came with physical incentives and rewards for new converts, such as the right of residence, access to land, or preferential legal status.

Anthropologist Robert Hefner adds that "Conversion assumes a variety of forms... because it is influenced by a larger interplay of identity, politics and morality". The message of Truth, a redemptive identity, and acceptance into a social organization whose purpose is the propagation of that message has proven to be a revolutionary force in its own right.

== Theology ==
According to sociologist Ines W. Jindra, there is a "theological dimension" to conversion. Avery Dulles quotes Bernard Lonergan saying "The subject of theology, then, is the person undergoing conversion to God". The conversion experience is basic and has the characteristics of being "concrete, dynamic, personal, communal, and historical". Through this focus on the individual, theology of conversion is provided with the same characteristics in its foundation.

Religious historian David W. Kling's History of Christian Conversion lists nine broad themes common to conversion narratives. Jindra describes the first theme as "human cognizance of divine presence," while Kling says, "God becomes real to people" through conversion. Conversion always has "context": humans are "socially constituted" beings and religious conversion always occurs in a social context. Jindra writes that, while all conversion accounts vary, they all show evidence of being based upon personal internal experiences of crisis expressed through the specific historical context in which the converts lived.

There are aspects of both "movement and resistance" in conversion. Christianity has, from its beginnings, been an evangelical mission oriented religion which has spread through conversion. However, people naturally tend toward inertia, toward the familiar, unless otherwise motivated toward change, making conversion the exception not the rule in history.

There is both "continuity and discontinuity" in the conversion process. Conversion can be disruptive and cause a rupture with the past, but rupture is rarely complete. Aspects of the past are frequently kept, resulting in a kind of "hybrid" faith. Gender also plays a direct role in how people do or do not convert.

Testimonies and narratives provide the vocabulary of conversion. In the more famous conversion stories, such as Augustine's and Martin Luther's, it is apparent the conversion story was later used, not only for personal insight and transformation, but also for drawing in potential converts. Kling writes that "the influence of [such] personal testimonies on the history of conversion cannot be over-estimated." Indications from Jandra's twenty-first century research indicates this is also true for more ordinary, less famous, conversions. Conversion produced change in the lives of most converts in important and positive ways: Jindra says "they became more stable, found meaning in life, tackled their former problematic biographical trajectories, and improved their relationships (Jindra, 2014)".

Conversion has historically been impacted by how personal "identity" and sense of self is defined. This can determine how much intentional action on the part of the individual convert has directed outcome, and how much outside forces may have impinged upon personal agency instead. In Christian conversion, there is nearly always a network of others who influenced the convert prior to conversion. Jindra writes that the specific context, which includes the ideology of the group being joined, the individual convert's particular crisis, "and the degree of agency vs. the influence of others" are important aspects influencing whether converts change or do not change after a conversion.

These factors overlap with research psychologist Lewis Rambo's stages of conversion. Rambo's model of conversion includes context, crisis (involving some form of searching by the prospective convert), encounter, and interaction, (with someone who believes in the new religious belief system). This is followed by commitment and its results.

== Social science ==
In his book Sociology of Religion, German sociologist Max Weber writes that religious conversion begins with the prophet, as the voice of revelation and vision, calling others to break with tradition and bring their lives into conformity with his "world-building truth". Weber believed that prophetic ideals can become, through the conversion of a community of followers, "a force for world transformation as powerful as anything in human history.

Calling conversion and Christianization "twin phenomena", Hefner has written that religious conversion was an important factor in the emergence of civilization and the making of the modern world. According to Hefner, the "reformulation of social relations, cultural meanings and personal experience" involved in conversion carries with it an inherent "world building aspect".

In the late nineteenth century, the development of world religions (Judaism, Christianity, Islam and Buddhism) was seen as part of the inevitable march toward human enlightenment in a linear upward evolution. Anthropology effectively demonstrated the failure of this model to provide explanation for religious variations.

The world religions developed institutions capable of standardizing knowledge and some have argued that this helped them survive while "empires and economic orders have come and gone". But in fact, only a few religions have been successful in propagating themselves over the long term, and standardized doctrine does not necessarily impact individual conversion and belief.

One of the most influential works in sociology of religion from the 1960s is Robert Bella's (1964) Religious Evolution, which argued that world religions all proclaim the existence of a transcendental realm that is superior to everyday reality, thereby legitimizing salvation/conversion experiences designed to link humans with that world. Bella describes the possibility of redemption/conversion under these terms as "world-shaking in its consequences". The tension between ordinary reality and the transcendent creates recognition of a need for social reform, driven by a redemptive vision, that remakes the world rather than passively accepting it. In this way, Hefner says, world religions loosened the grip of tradition and laid the foundation for human freedom.

== Psychology ==
While conversion is the most studied aspect of religion by psychologists of religion, there is little empirical data on the topic, and little change in method since William James' classic Varieties of Religious Experience in 1902. James Scroggs and William Douglas have written on seven current concerns in the psychology of conversion.

1. Definition. Calling this the "oldest issue in the field", Scroggs and Douglas indicate psychologists ask whether conversion requires a sudden about-face or gradual change. There is no consensus. The word connotes a sudden about-face, but psychologists are unwilling to let go of the possibility of gradual conversion.
2. Pathology. Freud saw religion as a pathology, and those who follow his school of thought have continued to do so. Empirical studies indicate religion is associated with good mental health among women, that it aids with depression and overcoming serious problems like heroin addiction, and that generally, there are significant links between religion and spirituality and good physical and mental health. In Scroggs and Douglas's view, which view a psychologist takes depends on their training and personal commitment to faith or non-faith.
3. Type of person. Many wonder if there is one kind of person that is more likely to be converted than others. Sociologists stress the importance of such variables as social class, group expectations, and social change (as in American frontier society or contemporary China). According to Scroggs and Douglas, William "James regarded the sick soul as the most likely candidate for conversion. The sick soul lives 'close to the pain threshold.' He is generally introverted and pessimistic in outlook, taking the evil of the world profoundly to heart. The sick soul is brooding, steeped in existential angst. He is Kierkegaard's man who is in despair and knows he is in despair".

Trauma and existential crisis can lead to conversion. For the already converted, trauma is also often associated with "beneficial changes in self-perception, relationships, and philosophy of life, and positive changes in the realm of existential, spiritual, or religious matters" according to a study by psychologists Rosemary de Castella and Janette Simmonds.

A 2011 study indicates conversion can take either an inward form, wherein religion becomes the primary guiding principle and goal of the convert's life, or it can take an outward form where religion mostly serves other purposes, such as political or economic goals, which are more important to that individual than religion. For those who experience inward conversion, lower levels of depression, anxiety and stress are associated, while higher levels are associated with those who practice outward conversion only.

1. Age. Scroggs and Douglas say that early writers on the psychology of conversion were unanimous in regarding adolescence as the most probable age for conversion.
  In surveys of three churches, psychologist Robert Ferm found the average ages of conversion to be 43, 46, and 41 years respectively. (Ferm, Robert, The Psychology of Christian Conversion. Westwood, N. J., Fleming Revell, I959, p. 218.) Converts made by Graham's first British campaign averaged in their middle twenties. Jung emphasized mid to late thirties... Hiltner writes that conversion "is most important, most likely, and most cultivatable in the thirties, rather than being regarded primarily as an adolescent phenomenon".
  Accordingly Ferm writes that, "It is probably fair to conclude from Erikson's theories that both the identity crisis in adolescence and the integrity crisis in the middle years constitute ripe moments for conversion".
2. Conscious or unconscious. Exactly how much of the conversion experience is brought on by conscious control, and how much by unconscious factors behind or even beyond an individual, is also a matter of debate. Forces beyond conscious control are cited by the majority of converts. Scriggs and Douglas wrote that "most psychologists agree the role of unconscious factors is extensive and often decisive in conversion, and that a long period of subconscious incubation precedes sudden conversions". Allport, Maslow, Rogers, and others stress the role of conscious decision.
3. Science-versus-religion. Psychologists as social scientists tend to operate according to a nothing-but reductionism. Conversion must be described as a natural process. Theologians and others who accept the possibility of the supernatural, have tended to take a something-more, hands-off-the-sacred-preserve approach to studying conversion. Different worldviews can bias interpretations. Scroggs and Douglas write that "No solution to this very difficult problem appears in the immediate purview", but they do suggest that acknowledging bias and incorporating both views in "not only interdisciplinary but interbias research is necessary".
4. Which approach? Because there are different schools of psychology with conflicting theories, determining which is most appropriate to the study of conversion is one of the issues Scroggs and Douglas perceive. "Behaviorism, operationalism, and learning theory have rarely been applied to the study of religious conversion," and the overwhelming majority of works have been written from a single perspective: "functionalism" which defines what is true as what works.

== Neurology ==
Kelly Bulkeley in The Oxford Handbook of Religion Conversion has written that, as of 2014, no neuro-scientific research focused specifically on religious conversion has been done. Nor is there a single consensus on how the brain/mind system works, and researchers take many different approaches. There is controversy over the mind/body problem, as well as whether the brain is simply modular (composed of separate parts), or if that is too limited an explanation for what Bulkeley calls the complex, "global, synthetic, whole-is-greater-than-the-sum-of-its-parts aspects of brain function". There is disagreement over determinism vs. free will, the use of brain imaging, first-person reports of conversion, and the applications of quantum physics.

The phenomenon of conversion is based on the belief that humans have the ability to change the way they mentally perceive and experience the world. Research on the plasticity of the brain has shown that the brain's ability to create new neural pathways remains with someone throughout their life. Bulkeley writes that "Cognitive neuroscience in relation to religious conversions, where people undergo a basic reordering of the assumptions and expectations that frame their perceptions of the world, may lead to new evidence regarding the latent potential of brain/mind development".

Studies on prayer and meditation show they alter the brain's functioning in measurable, material, ways:

Several implications flow from that basic finding. One is that at least some aspects of religion are not generated by pathological brain functioning. Current [cognitive neuroscience] research refutes the idea that religion [...] stems from faulty brain/mind processes. The best available scientific evidence indicates that people who engage in religiously motivated contemplative practices have normal, healthy brains. Perhaps other forms of religion can be more directly tied to neuropathology, but in the case of meditation and prayer the CN literature supports a pragmatic appreciation of the effectiveness of religious practices in shaping the healthy interaction of brain and mind.

== Statistics ==
According to a 2001 study by religion professor David B. Barrett of Columbia University and historian George Thomas Kurian, approximately 2.7 million people were converted to Christianity that year from another religion, while approximately 3.8 million people overall were converting annually. In the first decades of the twenty-first century, Pentecostalism is the largest and fastest growing form of Christianity. Professor of religion Dyron B. Daughrity quotes Paul Freston: "Within a couple of decades, half the world's Christians will be in Africa and Latin America. By 2050, on current trends, there will be as many Pentecostals in the world as there are Hindus, and twice as many Pentecostals as Buddhists". This growth is primarily due to religious conversion.

Historian Philip Jenkins observes that Christianity is also growing rapidly in China and some other Asian countries. Sociologist and specialist in Chinese religion Fenggang Yang from Purdue University writes that Christianity is "spreading among the Chinese of South-East Asia", and "Evangelical and Pentecostal Christianity is growing more quickly in China". More than half of these converts have university degrees.

Countries by percentage of Protestants 1938

Christian distribution globally

Social Anthropologist Juliette Koning and sociologist Heidi Dahles of Vrije Universiteit Amsterdam, agree there has been a "rapid expansion of charismatic Christianity from the 1980s onwards. Singapore, China, Hong Kong, Taiwan, Indonesia, and Malaysia are said to have the fastest-growing Christian communities and the majority of the new believers are "upwardly mobile, urban, middle-class Chinese". Allan Anderson and Edmond Tang have reported in their book Asian and Pentecostal: The Charismatic Face of Christianity in Asia that "Asia has the second largest number of Pentecostals/charismatics of any continent in the world, and seems to be fast catching up with the largest, Latin America." The World Christian Encyclopedia estimated 135 million in Asia compared to 80 million in North America.

It has been reported also that increasing numbers of young people are becoming Christians in several countries such as China, Hong Kong, Indonesia, Iran, Japan, Singapore, and South Korea.

The Council on Foreign Relations says the "number of Chinese Protestants has grown by an average of 10 percent annually since 1979". Award-winning historian of Christianity, Todd Hartch of Eastern Kentucky University, has written that by 2005, around 6 million Africans were converting annually to Christianity. According to Iranian historian Ladan Boroumand "Iran today is witnessing the highest rate of Christianization in the world".

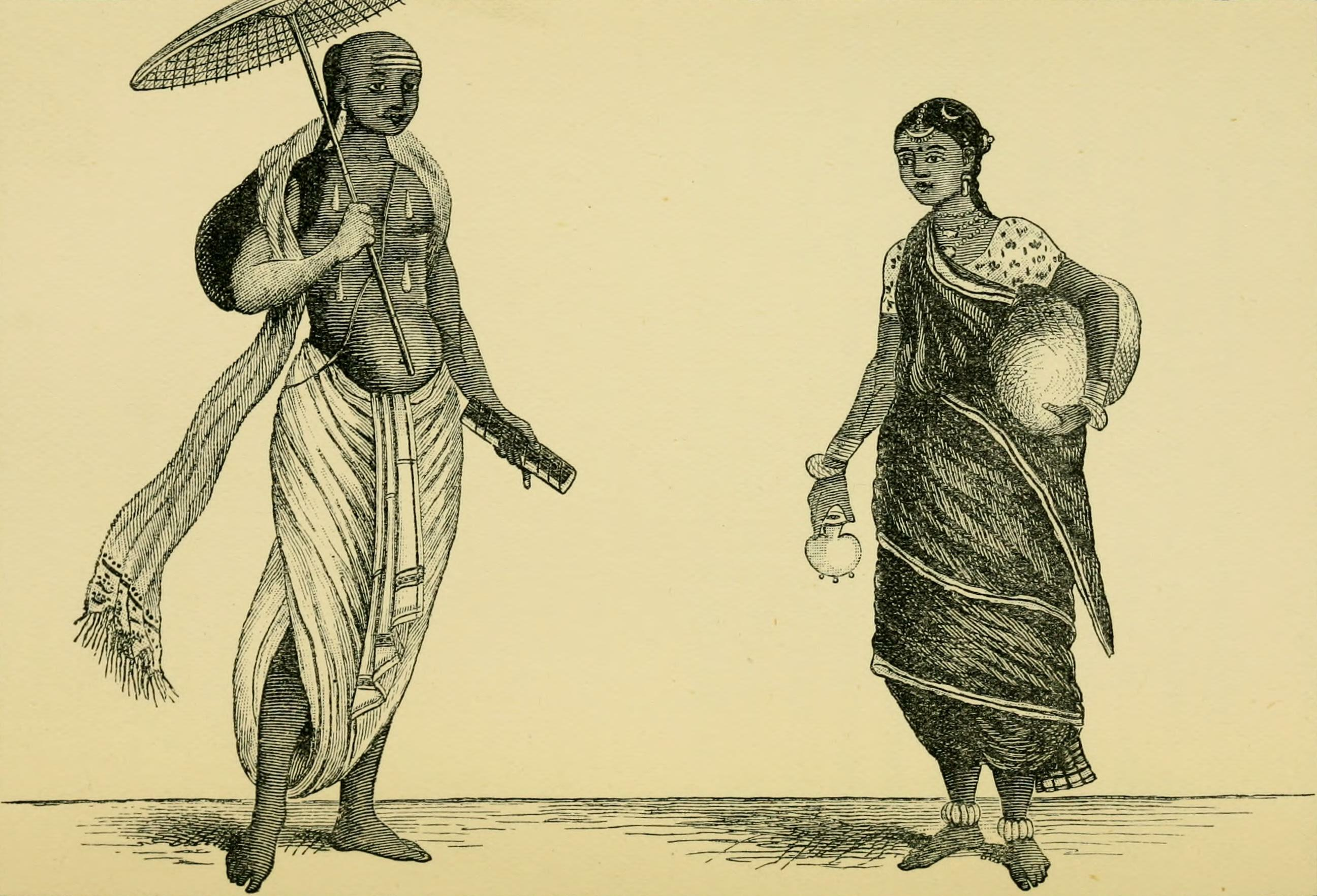
The gospel in South India—or the religious life, experience, and character of the Hindu Christians (1880)

While the exact number of Dalit converts to Christianity in India is not available, religion scholar William R. Burrow of Colorado State University has estimated that about 8% of Dalits have converted to Christianity. According to a 2021 study by the Pew Research Center, Christianity has grown in India in recent years due to conversion. Most converts are former Hindus, though some are former Muslims.

Since the 1960s, there has been a substantial increase in the number of conversions from Islam to Christianity, mostly to the Evangelical and Pentecostal denominations of Christianity. The 2015 study Believers in Christ from a Muslim Background: A Global Census estimated that 10.2 million Muslims converted to Christianity. Countries with the largest numbers of Muslims converted to Christianity include Indonesia (6,500,000), Nigeria (600,000), Iran (500,000 versus only 500 in 1979), the United States (450,000), Ethiopia (400,000), and Algeria (380,000). Indonesia is home to the largest Christian community of converts from Islam. Since the mid and late 1960s, between 2 and 2.5 million Muslims converted to Christianity. According to the Council on Foreign Relations in 2007, experts estimated that thousands of Muslims in the Western world converted to Christianity annually, but were not publicized due to fear of retribution.

== Methods of conversion ==
=== Prayer and example ===
Christians seek to help others discover God and come to know Jesus through prayer and example. Charles de Foucauld, for example, lived among the Berbers in north Africa, seeking their conversion not through sermons, but through his example.

=== Coercion ===
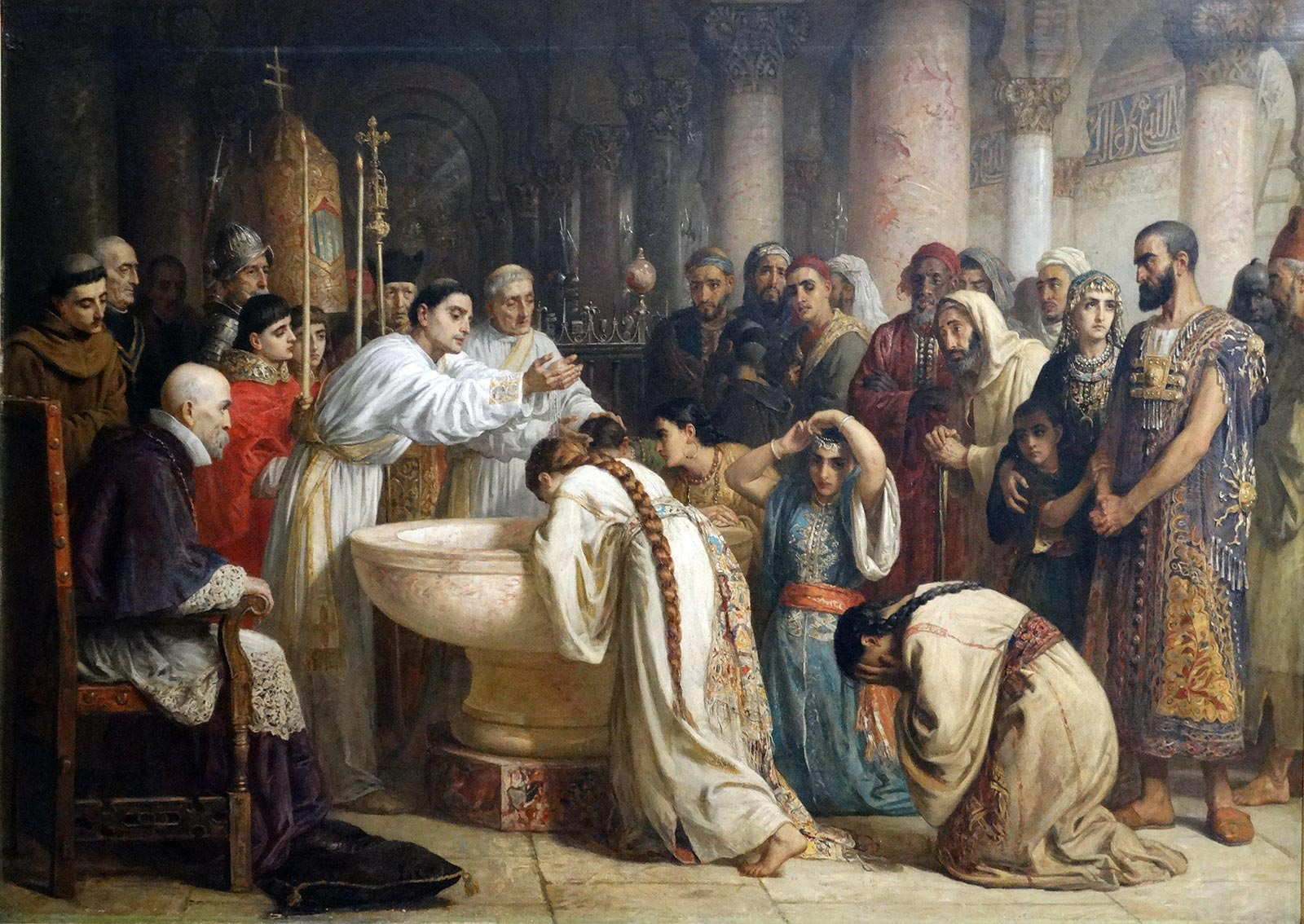
The Moorish Proselytes of Archbishop Ximenes, Granada, 1500, by Edwin Long, portraying the forced mass baptism of Muslims in Granada, Spain, following the Reconquista.

While Christian theologians, such as the fourth century Augustine and the ninth century Alcuin, have long maintained that conversion must be voluntary, there are historical examples of coercion in conversion to Christianity. Constantine used both law and force to eradicate the practice of sacrifice and repress heresy though not specifically to promote conversion. Theodosius also wrote laws to eliminate heresies, but made no requirement for pagans or Jews to convert to Christianity. However, the sixth century Eastern Roman emperor Justinian I and the seventh century emperor Heraclius attempted to force cultural and religious uniformity by requiring baptism of the Jews. In 612, the Visigothic King Sisebut, prompted by Heraclius, declared the obligatory conversion of all Jews in Spain. In the many new nation-states being formed in Eastern Europe of the Late Middle Ages, some kings and princes pressured their people to adopt the new religion, and in the Northern crusades, the fighting princes obtained widespread conversion through political pressure or military coercion even though the theologians continued to maintain that conversion must be voluntary.

=== Evangelism ===
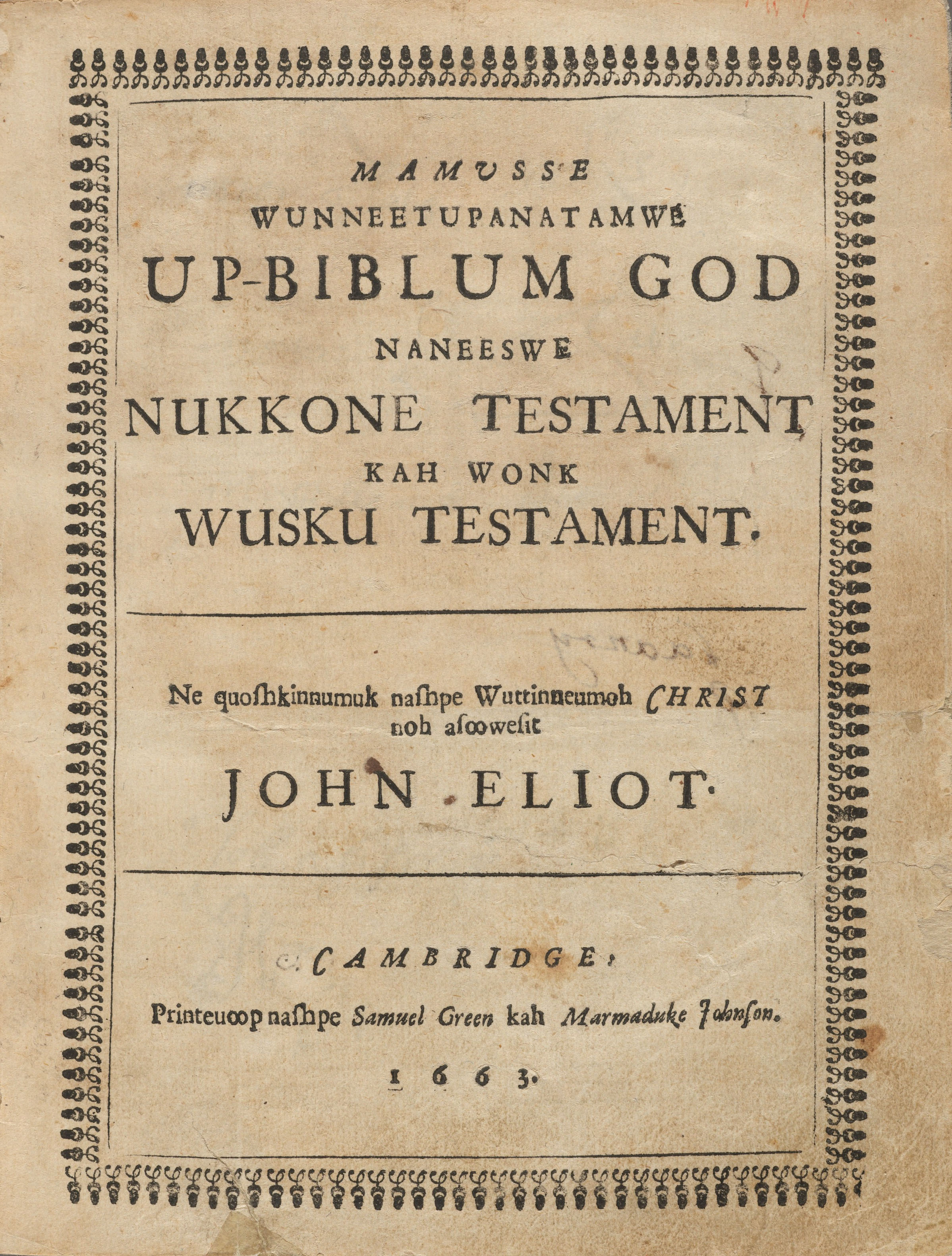
Mamusse Wunneetupanatamwe Up-Biblum God (1663) or the Eliot Indian Bible, a translation of the Bible into Massachusett, an Eastern Algonquian tongue, and the first Bible printed in British North America

Evangelism is the act of sharing the Christian gospel, the message and teachings of Jesus Christ. It is typically done with the intention of converting others to Christianity. (Note: Such intentions may be regarded as proselytising, which is illegal in many countries.) Evangelism can take several forms, such as personal conversations, preaching, media, and is especially associated with missionary work.

Christians who specialize in evangelism are often known as evangelists, whether they are in their home communities or living as missionaries in the field, although some Christian traditions refer to such people as missionaries in either case. Some Christian traditions consider evangelists to be in a leadership position; they may be found preaching to large meetings or in governance roles. In addition, Christian groups who encourage evangelism are sometimes known as evangelistic or evangelist.

=== Baptism ===
In most varieties of Christianity, baptism is the initiation rite for entrance into the Christian community. Almost all baptisms share in common the use of the Trinitarian formula (in the name of the Father, Son, and Holy Spirit) by the minister while baptizing the convert. Two aspects of baptism are sources of disagreement: mode and meaning. In Understanding Four Views on Baptism editors have written that Christians disagree on the meaning of baptism and whether it is a necessary aspect of conversion or simply demonstration of a conversion that has already taken place.

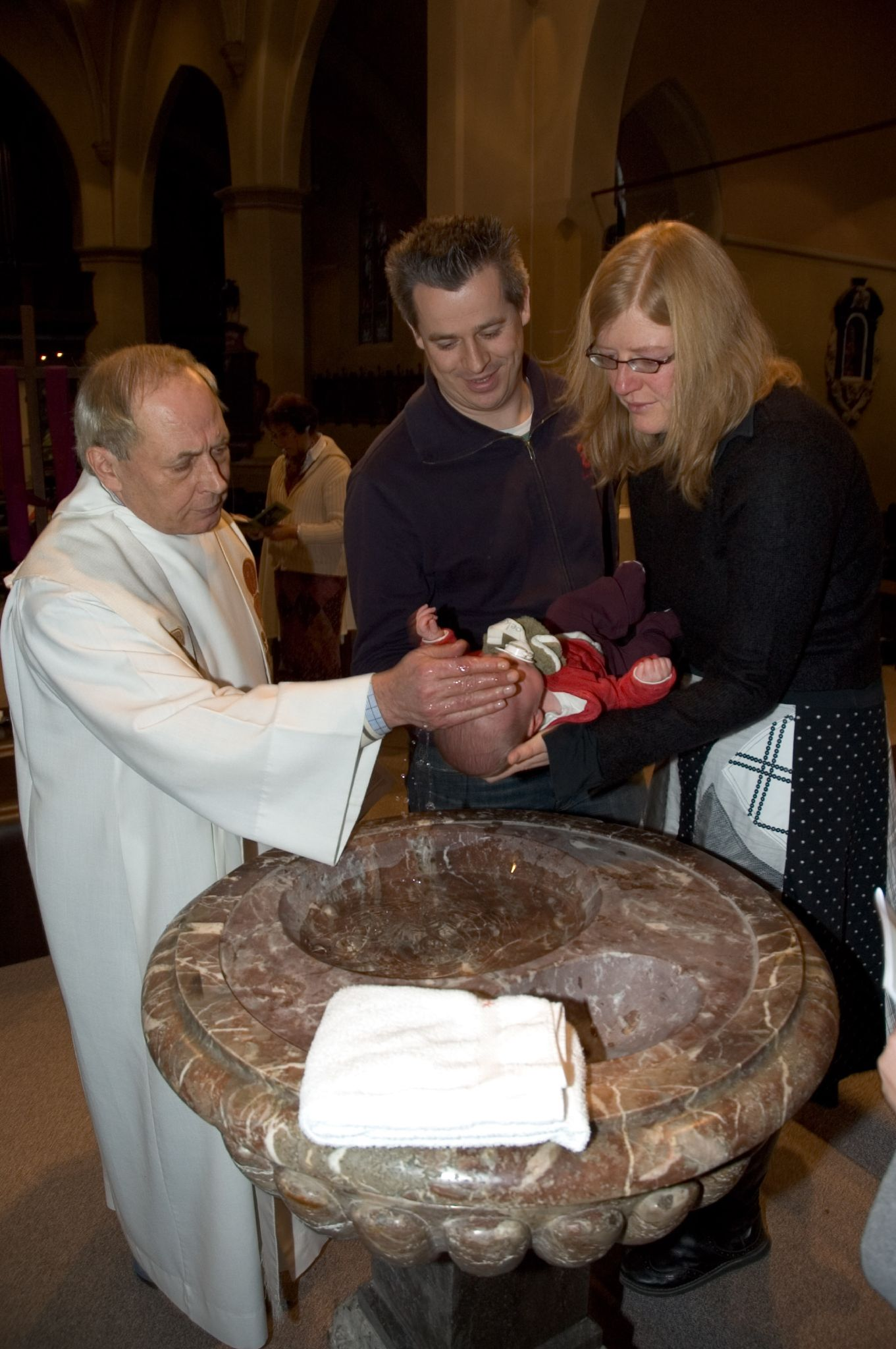
Baptism of a child by affusion

There are also different modes of baptism in Christianity. These include immersion (dunking), affusion (pouring), and aspersion (sprinkling). The most common practice in the ancient church was baptism by immersion of the whole head and body of an adult. It remained common into the Middle Ages and is still found in the Eastern church, the Anglican and Roman Catholic Churches, and in most Protestant denominations.

Historian Philip Schaff has written that sprinkling, or pouring of water on the head of a sick or dying person, where immersion was impractical, was also practiced in ancient times and up through the twelfth century, and is currently practiced in most of the West. However, according to the Oxford Dictionary of the Christian Church affusion has become the most common practice of the Western churches.

Infant baptism was controversial for the Protestant Reformers, and remains so for some Protestants, but according to Schaff, it was practiced by the ancients and is neither required nor forbidden in the New Testament.

The mode of baptism often depends on the denomination one enters, and in some cases, personal choice. Many Anglicans and Lutherans baptize by affusion. Presbyterians and Congregationalists accept baptism by pouring or sprinkling. Steven W. Lemke writes that the Presbyterian Westminster Confession says, "Dipping of the person into the water is not necessary". Many Evangelical Protestant churches, such as Baptists, believe that only full immersion baptism is valid. The Second London and Philadelphia confessions of the Baptists affirm that "immersion, or dipping of the person in water, is necessary". Baptism by immersion is again affirmed in Article 7 of the BF&M [Baptist Faith and Message]". Others, like Methodists, may conduct all three forms of baptism. Yet others, like Quakers, do not practice water baptism, believing that Jesus baptizes his followers in the Spirit while John baptized his followers in water.

=== Confirmation ===
Theologian Knut Alfsvåg writes that confirmation was first introduced by Pope Innocent I in the 5th century as part of the unified sacrament of baptism, chrismation (confirmation) and first communion that was commonly accepted by the 12th century. It was formally designated a sacrament in 1274 by the Council of Lyon. Baptism, along with the declaration and instruction involved in confirmation, and the Eucharist, have remained the essential elements of initiation in all Christian communities, however, Alfsvåg writes that confirmation has differing status in different denominations.

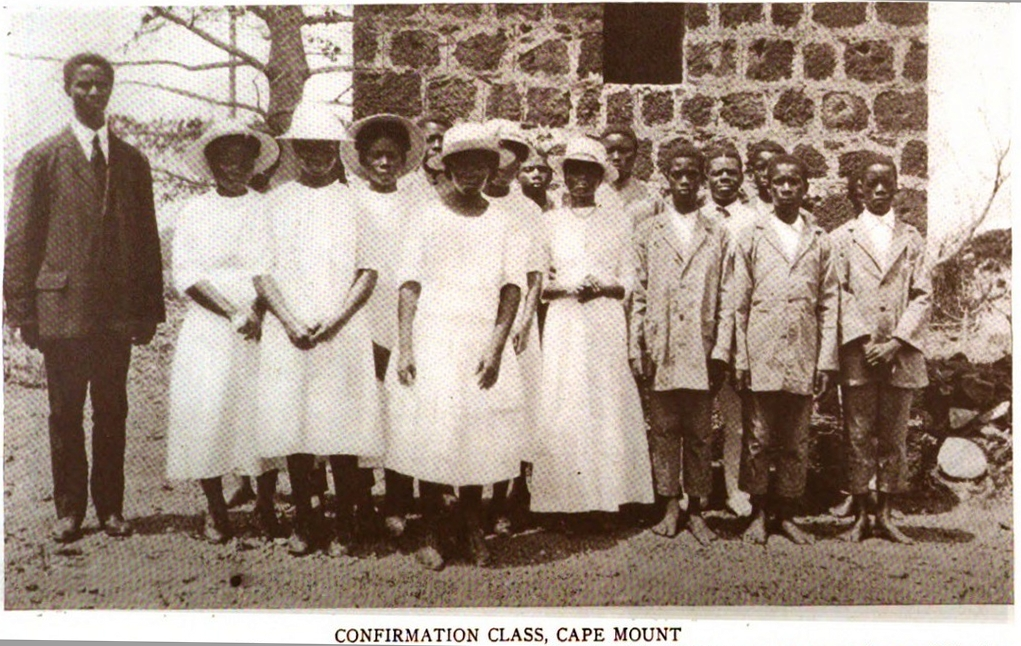
Confirmation class of 1918 at Cape Mount

Some see baptism, confirmation, and communion as elements of a unified sacrament through which one becomes a Christian and part of the church. Also known as Chrismation by eastern Christians, under some circumstances, confirmation may be administered immediately after baptism. When an adult decides to convert to the Catholic or Orthodox Church, they become a "catechumen" and attend classes to learn what conversion means and requires. Once classes are completed and the candidate is baptized, adults can then be confirmed immediately following baptism. A clergy member will anoint their forehead, (or in the case of Byzantine Christians, the forehead, eyes, nostrils, mouth, ears, breast, hands, and feet), with the chrisma (oil) calling upon the Holy Spirit to seal the convert with the gifts of the Spirit.

In Western churches that practice infant baptism (the Latin Church, the Church of England, Anglicans, Lutherans, Presbyterians, Congregationalists, Methodists, Nazarenes, Moravians, and United Protestants), infants who are baptized are not generally confirmed immediately except in cases of emergency such as illness or impending death. Otherwise, child candidates must wait till they are old enough to make a decision for themselves. Confirmation cannot occur until the candidate has participated in confirmation classes, demonstrated an adequate understanding of what they are agreeing to, and are able to profess "with their own mouth" their desire to be confirmed in their faith. In the Eastern Churches (Eastern Orthodoxy, Eastern Catholicism, Oriental Orthodoxy, and the Church of the East), the rite is called chrismation, and is done immediately after baptism, regardless of age.

To be fully in communion with the Catholic Church (a phrase used since c. 205), the Catholic Church requires a convert to have professed faith and practice the sacraments—baptism, confirmation and the Eucharist. The Orthodox Church also maintains the tradition of baptism, chrismation and first communion as a united rite till this day, referring to chrismation as "the Pentecost of the individual" (a reference to the Holy Spirit).

The practice of confirmation was criticized during the Reformation by those who do not consider confirmation a condition for conversion to Christianity or being a fully accepted member of the church. Luther saw confirmation as "a churchly rite or sacramental ceremony", but for Luther, it was baptism that was necessary and not confirmation. John Wesley removed the rite altogether leaving Methodism with no rite of confirmation from 1785 to 1965. These see confirmation as a combination of intercessory prayer and as a graduation ceremony after the period of instruction.

== Denominational switching ==
Transferring from one Christian denomination, such as Presbyterianism, to another Christian denomination, such as Catholicism, has not generally been seen by researchers as conversion to Christianity. Mark C. Suchman says this is because most sociologists and other scientists have defined conversion as "radical personal change, particularly change involving a shift in one's sense of 'root reality'". However, in Suchman's view, this produces a form of 'selection bias' within the research. He writes that the study of "everyday" religious mobility is not a substitute for analyses of "true conversion", but the denominational switching that he refers to as "religious mobility" can be seen as an aspect of conversion.

Suchman describes six types, or causes, of "religious mobility" as a supplement and complement to the more traditionally limited concept of conversion. He draws on theories from the sociology of deviance where there is some recognition that "a change of religious affiliation generally represents a break with previous norms and a severing of social commitments—even when it does not involve a radical personality realignment".

Theories of deviance define what can be considered as the variables and determinants involved and what kind of mobility can be seen as random. "Strain theory" argues that those who are unhappy in their religious affiliation will generally "engage in deviance" from that group. Those who are not well integrated in their religious social group, those who become enmeshed in social relations outside the group with participants in deviant cultures, and those whose ethnicity and traditional background differs from their current affiliation are candidates for switching. Intermarriage with a partner of different religion or denomination is also associated with religious switching.

In the Catholic Church, the Second Vatican Council ordered a new rite of reception into the church be drafted, which recognised the step of admission being taken by people "who have already been validly baptized". Special arrangements were made to facilitate the admission of "separated Eastern Christians" to the Catholic Church: no more was to be asked of such a person than "what a bare profession of the Catholic faith demands", and in the case of an ordained Eastern Christian, they would be permitted to exercise the Orders they possess on joining the unity of the Catholic Church, subject to certain rules to be established.

== See also ==
- Catholicisation
- Christian mission to Jews
- Christianization
- Conversion of the Jews (future event)
- Credo
- Engel scale
- Forced conversion
- List of converts to Christianity
- Rite of Christian Initiation for Adults (RCIA)

== Bibliography ==
- Albert, Eleanor (2018). "Christianity in China". Council on Foreign Relations. Archived from the original on 2021-07-07.
- * Alfsvåg, K. (2022). "The Role of Confirmation in Christian Initiation". Journal of Youth and Theology. 1 (2): 1–20. doi:10.1163/24055093-bja10036. hdl:11250/3051856. S2CID 252339347.
- Allott, Stephen (1974). Alcuin of York, c.732 to 804 CE: his life and letters. William Sessions Limited. ISBN 978-0-900-65721-4.
- Anderson, Allan (2013). An Introduction to Pentecostalism: Global Charismatic Christianity. Cambridge University Press. ISBN 978-1-107-03399-3.
- Anderson, Allan; Tang, Edmund (2005). Asian and Pentecostal: The Charismatic Face of Christianity in Asia. Oxford Centre for Mission Studies. ISBN 9781870345439.
- Armstrong, John H.; Engle, Paul E., eds. (2009). Understanding Four Views on Baptism. Zondervan. ISBN 9780310866985.
- Barrett, David B.; Kurian, George Thomas; Johnson, Todd M., eds. (2001). World Christian Encyclopedia. Oxford University Press USA. ISBN 978-0-19-507963-0.
- * Bazmi, Mahsa Jabari; Khalil, Allahvirdiyani (2011). "Relationship of religious orientation (inward-outward) with depression, anxiety and stress". Procedia - Social and Behavioral Sciences. 30: 2047–2049. doi:10.1016/j.sbspro.2011.10.396.
- Bresnan, John (2005). Indonesia: The Great Transition. Rowman & Littlefield. ISBN 978-0-7425-4011-8. "Between 1966 and 1976, almost 2 million ethnic Javanese, most from nominally Islamic backgrounds, converted to Christianity. Another 250,000 to 400,000 became Hindu."
- Brown, P. (1963). "St. Augustine's Attitude to Religious Coercion". Journal of Roman Studies. 54 (1–2): 107–116. doi:10.2307/298656. JSTOR 298656. S2CID 162757247.
- Bulkeley, Kelly (2014). "10 Religious Conversion and Cognitive Neuroscience". In Rambo, Lewis R.; Farhadian, Charles E. (eds.). The Oxford Handbook of Religious Conversion. Oxford University Press. doi:10.1093/oxfordhb/9780195338522.013.010. ISBN 978-0-19-971354-7.
- Burrow, William R. (2009). Redemption And Dialogue. Wipf and Stock Publishers. p. 201. ISBN 978-1-60899-116-7.
- Cabasilas, St Nicholas. "The Sacrament of Holy Baptism in the Orthodox Christian Church". The Sacraments of the Orthodox Church. Greek Orthodox Archdiocese of America.
- Cross, Frank Leslie; Livingstone, Elizabeth A., eds. (2005). The Oxford Dictionary of the Christian Church (revised ed.). Oxford University Press. ISBN 978-0-19-280290-3.
- Daniels, Timothy P. (2017). Sharia Dynamics: Islamic Law and Sociopolitical Processes. Springer. ISBN 978-3-319-45692-8. "almost two million nominal Muslims to convert to Christianity"
- Daughrity, Dyron B. (2010). The Changing World of Christianity: The Global History of a Borderless Religion (illustrated ed.). Peter Lang. ISBN 978-1-4331-0452-7.
- de Castella, Rosemary; Simmonds, Janette Graetz (2012). "There's a deeper level of meaning as to what suffering's all about": experiences of religious and spiritual growth following trauma". Mental Health, Religion & Culture. 16 (5): 536–556. doi:10.1080/13674676.2012.702738. S2CID 144124240.
- Dulles, Avery (1981). "Fundamental Theology and the Dynamics of Conversion". The Thomist: A Speculative Quarterly Review. 45 (2): 175–193. doi:10.1353/tho.1981.0025.
- Fonnesberg-Schmidt, Iben (2007). The popes and the Baltic crusades, 1147–1254. Brill. ISBN 978-90-04-15502-2.
- Frykenberg, Robert Eric; Low, Alaine M. (2003). Christians and Missionaries in India: Cross-cultural Communication Since 1500, with Special Reference to Caste, Conversion, and Colonialism. Eerdmans. ISBN 978-0-8028-3956-5.
- García-Arenal, Mercedes; Glazer-Eytan, Yonatan (2019). Forced conversion in Christianity, Judaism and Islam: coercion and faith in premodern Iberia and beyond. Brill. ISBN 978-90-04-41682-6.
- R. G. (18 November 2017). "Why is Protestantism flourishing in the developing world?". The Economist. Archived from the original on 2018-08-20.
- Hanigan, James P. (April 1983). "Conversion and Christian Ethics". Theology Today. 40 (1): 25–35. doi:10.1177/004057368304000104. S2CID 147202154. Archived from the original on 2012-05-02.
- Hartch, Todd (2014). The Rebirth of Latin American Christianity. Oxford University Press. p. 1. ISBN 978-0-19-936514-2.
- Hebblewhite, Mark (2020). Theodosius and the Limits of Empire. London: Routledge. doi:10.4324/9781315103334. ISBN 978-1-138-10298-9. S2CID 213344890.
- Hefner, Robert W. (2023). Conversion to Christianity: Historical and Anthropological Perspectives on a Great Transformation (reprint ed.). Univ of California Press. ISBN 978-0-520-91256-4.
- Hill, Peter C.; Pargament, Kenneth I. (2008). "Advances in the conceptualization and measurement of religion and spirituality: Implications for physical and mental health research". Psychology of Religion and Spirituality. S (1): 3–17. doi:10.1037/1941-1022.S.1.3.
- Inbody, Tyron (2005). The Faith of the Christian Church: An Introduction to Theology (illustrated ed.). Wm. B. Eerdman's. ISBN 978-0-8028-4151-3.
- Irmscher, Johannes (1988). "Non-christians and sectarians under Justinian: the fate of the inculpated". Collection de l'Institut des Sciences et Techniques de l'Antiquité. 367 (1): 165–167. Archived from the original on 2022-06-01.
- Jagger, Peter J. (1971). "Christian Unity and Valid Baptism". Theology. 74 (615): 404–413. doi:10.1177/0040571X7107400905.
- Jakubiak, Tomasz (2021). "Full Communion with the Catholic Church and the Validity of Taking on the Munus of Sponsor". Roczniki Nauk Prawnych. 31 (1): 163–179. doi:10.18290/rnp21311-9.
- Jenkins, Philip (2011). The Next Christendom: The Coming of Global Christianity (illustrated ed.). Oxford University Press. ISBN 978-0-19-976746-5.
- Jensen, Robin M. (2012). "Material and Documentary Evidence for the Practice of Early Christian Baptism". Journal of Early Christian Studies. 20 (3): 371–405. doi:10.1353/earl.2012.0019. S2CID 170787102.
- Jindra, I.W. (2021). "A History of Christian Conversion and Other Conversion Models: a Review Essay". Pastoral Psychology. 70 (2): 141–150. doi:10.1007/s11089-021-00939-4.
- Kaldellis, Anthony (2012). Procopius of Caesarea: Tyranny, History, and Philosophy at the End of Antiquity. University of Pennsylvania Press. ISBN 978-0-8122-0241-0.
- Kling, David (2020). A History of Christian Conversion. Oxford University Press. ISBN 9780195320923.
- Leithart, Peter J. (2010). Defending Constantine The Twilight of an Empire and the Dawn of Christendom. InterVarsity Press. ISBN 978-0-8308-2722-0.
- Lemke, Steve W. (2008). "What Is A Baptist? Nine Marks That Separate Baptists From Presbyterians" (PDF). Journal for Baptist Theology & Ministry. 5 (2).
- Lichtenberger, Achim; Raja, Rubina (2018). "From synagogue to church: The Appropriation of the Synagogue of Gerasa/Jerash under Justinian". Jahrbuch für Antike und Christentum. 61. Archived from the original on 2026-02-06.
- Lim, Richard (2012). "33 Christianization, Secularization, and the Transformation of Public Life". In Rousseau, Philip (ed.). A Companion to Late Antiquity. John Wiley & Sons. ISBN 978-1-118-29347-8.
- Makabenta, Yen (18 November 2017). "Protestantism: The fastest growing religion in the developing world". The Manila Times. Archived from the original on 2018-02-21.
- McAlilly, C. T. (2019). The end of confirmation in American Methodism (dissertation). Duke University. ProQuest 2240085843. Archived from the original on 2023-10-02.
- Miller, Duane Alexander; Johnstone, Patrick (2015). "Believers in Christ from a Muslim background: A global census" (PDF). Interdisciplinary Journal of Research on Religion. 11. Archived (PDF) from the original on 2026-01-16.
- Ng, Ho-Yee; Shek, Daniel T. L. (2001). "Religion and Therapy: Religious Conversion and the Mental Health of Chronic Heroin-Addicted Persons". Journal of Religion and Health. 40 (4): 399–410. doi:10.1023/A:1012835916748. S2CID 44673691.
- Osmer, Richard Robert (1996). Confirmation: Presbyterian Practices in Ecumenical Perspective (illustrated ed.). Geneva Press. ISBN 978-0-664-50000-9.
- Pipes, Daniel (12 June 2021). "The Perilous Path from Muslim to Christian". The National Interest. Center for the National Interest.
- Rambo, Lewis Ray; Farhadian, Charles E., eds. (2014). The Oxford Handbook of Religious Conversion. Oxford University Press. ISBN 978-0-19-533852-2.
- SAHGAL, NEHA; EVANS, JONATHAN; SALAZAR, ARIANA MONIQUE; STARR, KELSEY JO; CORICHI, MANOLO (2021). "Religion in India: Tolerance and Segregation". Pew Research Center. Archived from the original on 2021-07-17. "Indians say it is important to respect all religions, but major religious groups see little in common and want to live separately"
- Sáry, Pál (2019). "Remarks on the Edict of Thessalonica of 380". In Vojtech Vladár (ed.). Perpauca Terrena Blande Honori dedicata pocta Petrovi Blahovi K Nedožitým 80. Narodeninám. Trnava: Trnavská Univerzity. pp. 67–80. ISBN 978-80-568-0313-4.
- Schaff, Philip (1882). History of the Christian Church, Volume 3. Pennsylvania State University.
- Scroggs, J.R.; Douglas, W.G.T. (July 1967). "Issues in the psychology of religious conversion". Journal of Religion and Health. 6 (3): 204–216. doi:10.1007/BF01532239. PMID 24425054. S2CID 11987224.
- Sharf, A. (1955). "Byzantine Jewry in the seventh century". Byzantinische Zeitschrift. 48 (1): 103–115. doi:10.1515/byzs.1955.48.1.103. S2CID 192161413.
- Shaver, P.; Lenauer, M.; Sadd, S. (1980). "Religiousness, conversion, and subjective well-being: the "healthy-minded" religion of modern American women". The American Journal of Psychiatry. 137 (12): 1563–1568. doi:10.1176/ajp.137.12.1563. PMID 7435714.
- Štefan, Ivo (2022). "6". In Curta, Florin (ed.). The Routledge handbook of east central and eastern europe in the middle ages, 500–1300. Routledge. pp. 101–120. ISBN 978-0-367-22655-8.
- Stookey, Laurence Hull (1982). Baptism: Christ's Act in the Church (reprint ed.). Abingdon Press. ISBN 978-0-687-02364-6.
- Suchman, Mark C. (1992). "Analyzing the Determinants of Everyday Conversion". Sociological Analysis. 53: S15–S33. doi:10.2307/3711248. JSTOR 3711248.
- Tedeschi, Richard G.; Park, Crystal L.; Calhoun, Lawrence G., eds. (1998). Posttraumatic Growth: Positive Changes in the Aftermath of Crisis. Routledge. ISBN 978-1-1356-8980-3.
- Warnke, Harold E. (1971). The Ways of Our Fathers as to the Age of Communicants: Confirmation and the Age of First Communion (PDF). Northern Wisconsin District Pastoral Conference at Marinette, Wisconsin on 25–26 October 1971 – via essays.wisluthsem.org.
- Yang, Fenggang (20 January 2017). "Chinese Conversion to Evangelical Christianity: The Importance of Social and Cultural Contexts". Sociology of Religion. 59 (3). Oxford University Press: 237–257. doi:10.2307/3711910. JSTOR 3711910.
- Zurlo, Gina A. (2020). "1 A Demographic Profile of Christianity in East and Southeast Asia". In Ross, Kenneth R.; Alvarez, Francis D.; Johnson, Todd M. (eds.). Christianity in East and Southeast Asia (illustrated ed.). Edinburgh University Press. ISBN 978-1-4744-5162-8.
