= Savage House (Nashville, Tennessee) =

Historic house in Tennessee, United States

- U.S. National Register of Historic Places
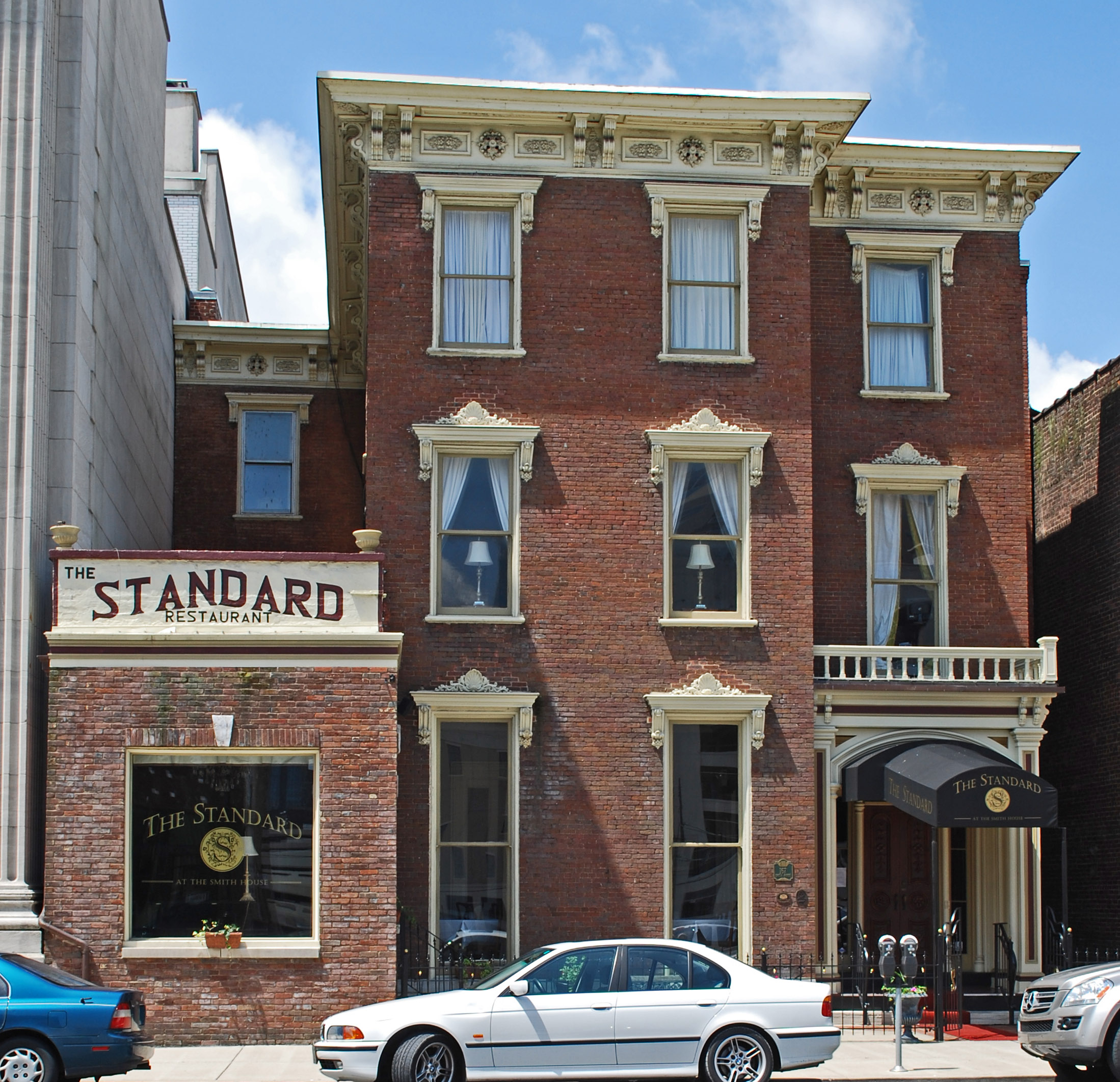

- Location within Tennessee Location within the United States
- Location: 167 8th Ave., N., Nashville, Tennessee
- Coordinates: 36°9′39″N 86°47′1″W
- Area: 0.2 acres (0.081 ha)
- Built: 1850
- Architectural style: Italianate
- NRHP reference No.: 83003029
- Added to NRHP: January 11, 1983

The Savage House is a historic three-storey townhouse in Nashville, Tennessee, USA.

== History ==
The townhouse was built in the 1850s, prior to the American Civil War, and designed in the Italianate architectural style. In 1859, the house was acquired by Mary E. Claiborne, who turned it into a boarding house until 1881. Three years later, in 1884, it was acquired by Julius Sax, who rented it to the Standard Club, a Jewish private members' club, in 1891.

It was acquired by Dr. Giles Christopher Savage, an ophthalmologist and professor at the Vanderbilt University School of Medicine, in 1889. Savage used it as a practice, as did his daughter, Kate Savage Zerfoss, a Tulane University Medical School graduate who also taught at the Vanderbilt University Medical School. Her husband, Dr. Tom Zerfoss, was a physician with the Vanderbilt Student Health Service. Meanwhile, another one of Dr Savage's daughters, Portia Savage Ward, opened an antiques store, which closed down in 1980.

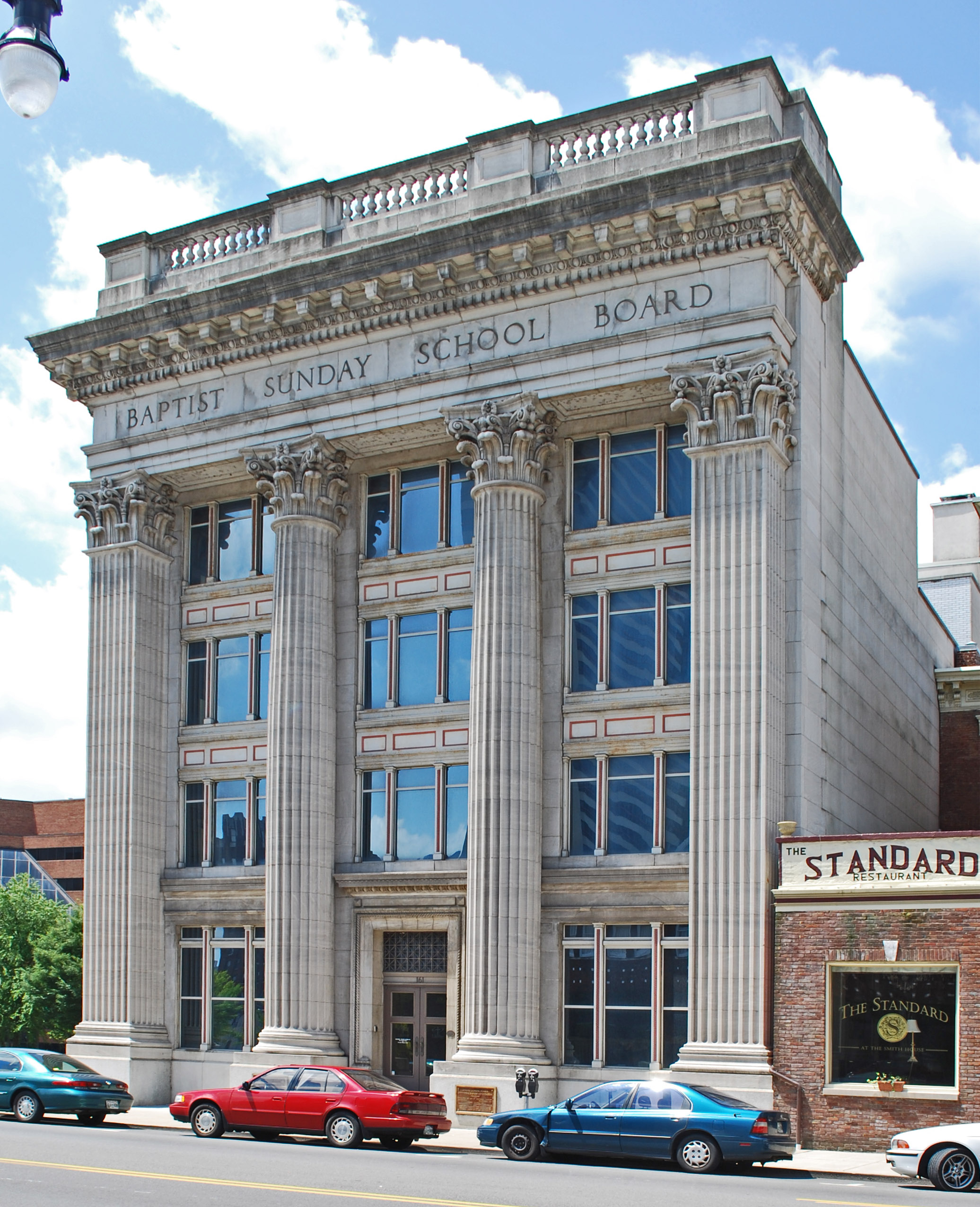
The Frost Building on the left, with the Savage House on the right.

The building stands next to the Frost Building, another historic building listed on the NRHP.

== Architectural significance ==
It has been listed on the National Register of Historic Places since January 11, 1983.
