= The Gulch (Nashville) =

Neighborhood in Nashville, Tennessee

Coordinates: 36.153°N 86.782°W

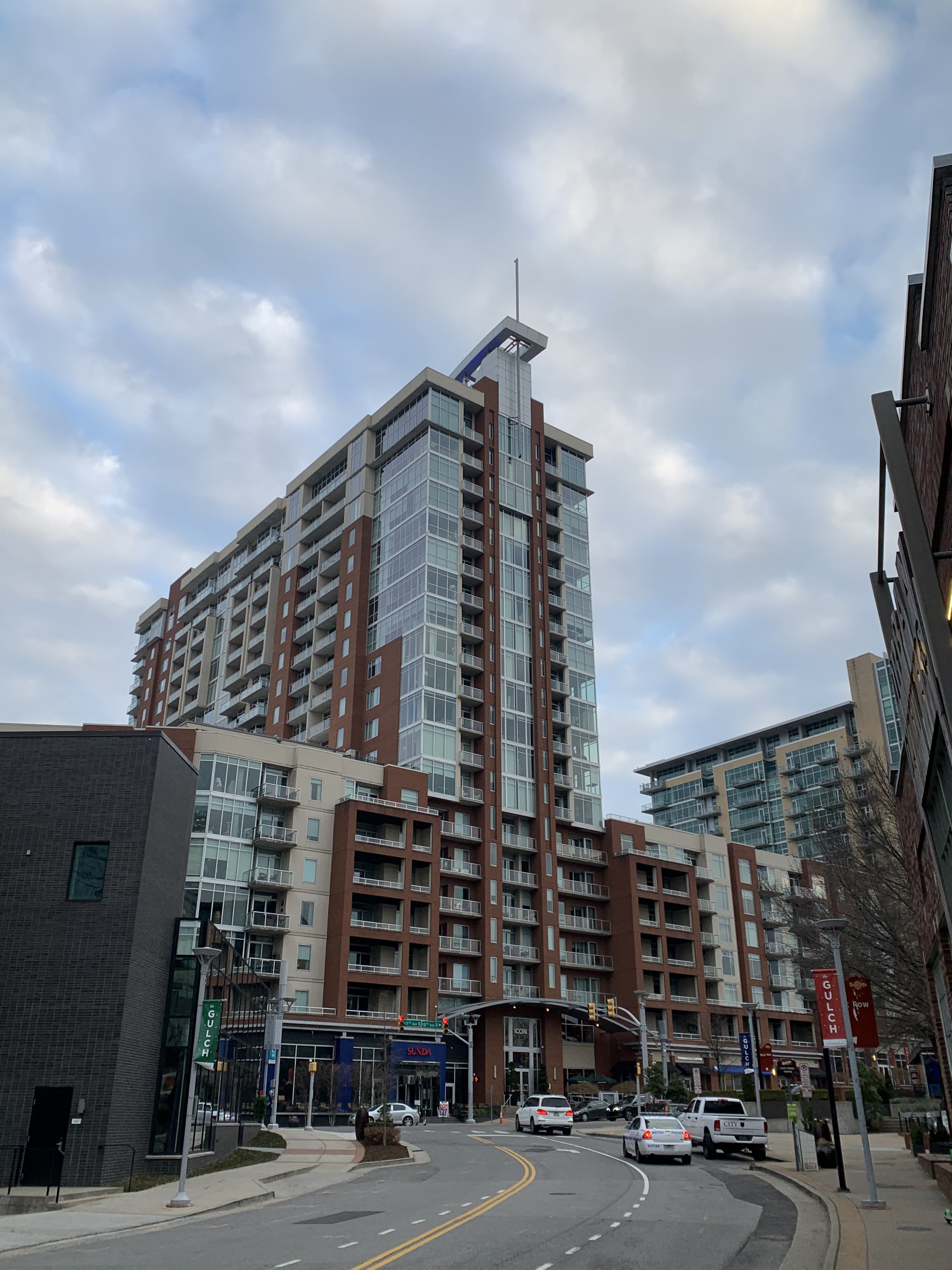
ICON in the Gulch

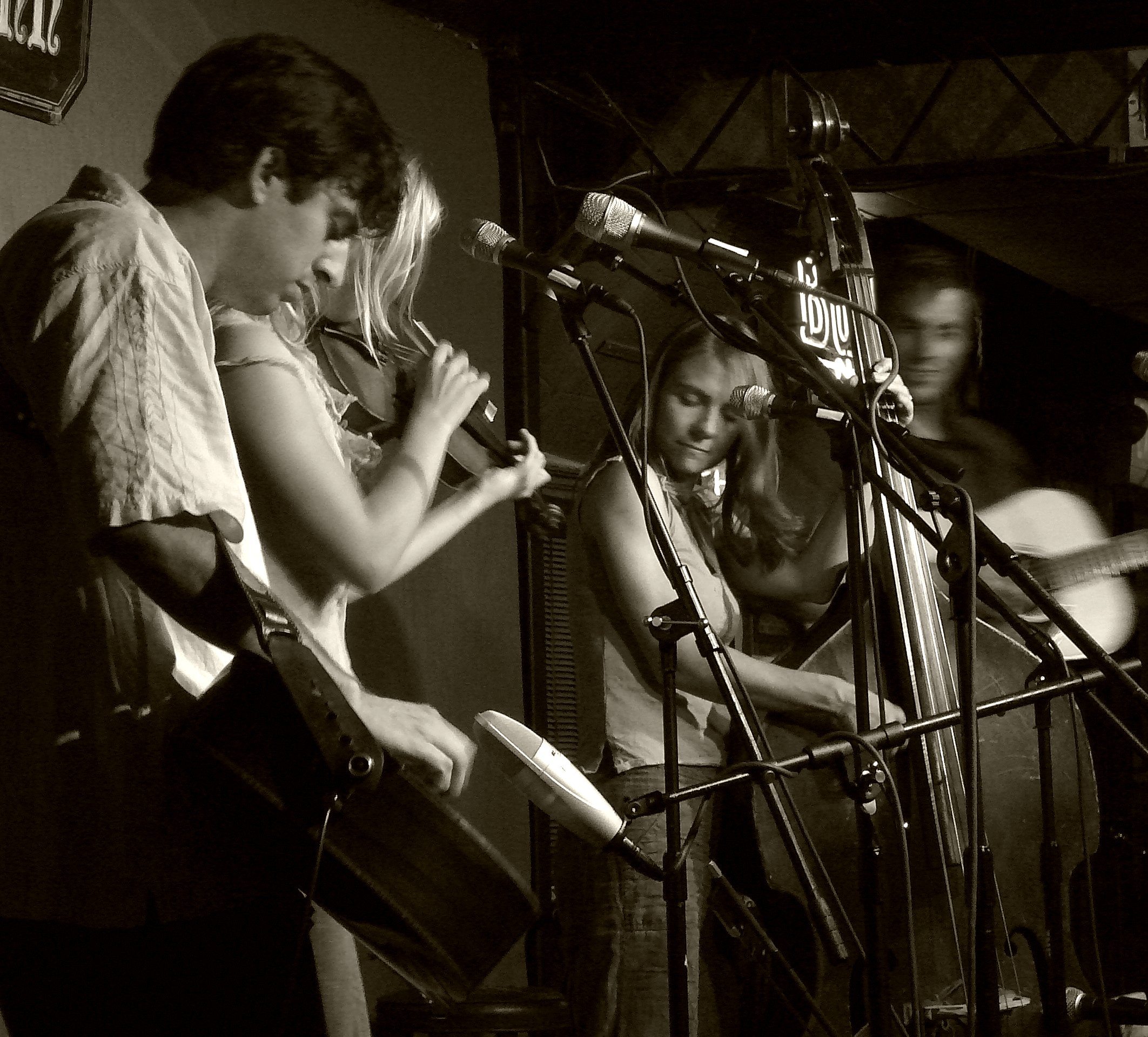
The Biscuit Burners performing at The Gulch's famed Station Inn (2008)

The Gulch is a neighborhood on the south fringe of downtown Nashville, Tennessee, near Interstate 40, Interstate 65, and Interstate 24. It is known to be a trendy and hip neighborhood, and a popular destination for locals, college students, and visitors.

== History ==
In the early 2000s, the Gulch only consisted of parking lots and very few attractions. The Gulch Business Improvement District (GBID) was created in 2006 and is managed by the Nashville Downtown Partnership. The area is currently undergoing an urban revitalization, with new residents, office space, and retail shops moving into newly built or recently renovated buildings. On February 17, 2009, it was announced the Gulch neighborhood had been certified as a LEED Green Neighborhood. It was the first neighborhood in the American South to become so certified, and one of only a few in the United States to do so at the time. The announcement was made by Mayor Karl Dean and developer MarketStreet Enterprises.

The Gulch is home to one of Nashville's most famous and historic music venues, The Station Inn. Also near the Gulch is The Mercy Lounge, and the historic Union Station Hotel.

== Neighborhood boundaries ==
The Gulch neighborhood is bound by many neighborhoods, such as downtown and SoBro to the northeast, Pietown to the east, Music Row to the west, and the new Nashville Yards neighborhood to the north
