= Thom S. Rainer =

American executive and writer (born 1955)

- Born: July 16, 1955 (age 71); Union Springs, Alabama, U.S.
- Title: Former President and CEO, LifeWay Christian Resources
- Spouse: Nellie Jo King

Academic background
- Education: University of Alabama; Southern Baptist Theological Seminary

Academic work
- Institutions: Southern Baptist Theological Seminary

Thom S. Rainer (born July 16, 1955) is an American writer, researcher, speaker, and former president and CEO of LifeWay Christian Resources, an entity of the Southern Baptist Convention in Nashville, Tennessee. He is the author of several best selling books, including I Am a Church Member, named a CBA #1 Best Seller (2013–2014) and Monthly Best Seller (2013–2015). It was also recognized as a Monthly Best Seller (2013–2015), a Gold Medallion Award winner (2015), and a Platinum Book Award winner (2016) by the Evangelical Christian Publishers Association, and recognized by Leadership Journal as Best of the Best in the Leaders Outer Life category (2013); Autopsy of a Deceased Church, Christian Retailing's Best Book of the Year: Church and Culture (2015); and Simple Church, the 2007 Christianity Today Book Award winner in the Church/Pastoral Leadership category. After resigning as CEO, Rainer remained as the Chief Advisory Officer On September 29, 2020, it was announced that Lifeway filed a lawsuit against Rainer after he allegedly violated a non-compete agreement by publishing a book with Tyndale Press, but on September 30 it was announced they decided to seek a non-litigation resolution and October 5 it was announced that Rainer agreed to end his relationship with Tyndale and avoid litigation.

== Biography ==
Rainer was born in Union Springs, Alabama and is a 1977 graduate of the University of Alabama, majoring in corporate finance with minors in statistics and economics. He began his career as a cash management officer (1977–80) at Trust Company of Georgia, now SunTrust. By age 25, Rainer became a fifth-generation banker and the youngest vice president for corporate lending of SouthTrust Bank in Anniston, Alabama (1980–83).

Rainer entered Christian vocational ministry in 1982 and earned his Master of Divinity and Doctor of Philosophy degrees from the Southern Baptist Theological Seminary in Louisville, Kentucky. He served as pastor of churches in Alabama, Florida, Kentucky and Indiana prior to joining the faculty of SBTS in 1994 as founding dean of the Billy Graham School of Missions, Evangelism and Church Growth. Also while serving at SBTS, Rainer founded and served as president and CEO of the Rainer Group.

In September 2005, Rainer was unanimously elected by the trustees of LifeWay Christian Resources to succeed James T. Draper as the ninth president of LifeWay, one of the world's largest Christian resource providers. Shortly after assuming the presidency, Rainer established B&H Academic, a branch of LifeWay's B&H Publishing Group, to provide pastors, seminary professors and students with theologically conservative commentaries, academic monographs and other biblically based resources.

== Blog and podcast ==
Rainer blogs at ThomRainer.com and hosts the highly rated Rainer on Leadership Podcast. Rainer on Leadership, a twice weekly podcast which experienced 265 percent growth between 2014 and 2016, was started as a companion to Rainer's blog. It surpassed 100,000 monthly downloads in September 2016. His blog is listed at #6 on Redeeming God's list of Christian blogs.

== LifeWay Research ==
Not long after becoming president of LifeWay, Rainer announced the formation of LifeWay Research for the purpose of assisting and equipping church leaders with insight and advice that will lead to greater levels of church health and effectiveness.

LifeWay Research is frequently cited in religious and mainstream media, including The New York Times, USA Today, Washington Post, Christianity Today, The Christian Post, and Baptist Press.

== Great Commission resurgence ==
In the 2005 Spring edition of the Southern Baptist Journal of Theology, Rainer published a tribute and a review of the Southern Baptist Convention conservative resurgence after 25 years. The article entitled "A Resurgence Not Yet Realized," noted that, though a theological turnaround had taken place in the Southern Baptist Convention, there was little indication that a resurgence of evangelism had taken place in the churches. In the article Rainer called for a "Great Commission resurgence", a phrase that would become the nomenclature for a renewed Great Commission emphasis in the SBC years later.

== Awards and recognition ==
In the spring of 2004, Rainer was invited to be a member of the Society of Fellows for the R. G. Lee Center for Christian Ministry at Union University.

In 2008, Rainer received the M. E. Dodd Denominational Service Award from Union University. The Dodd Award is the highest denominational service award Union gives. It is named for the man who was a Union alumnus, served as president of the Southern Baptist Convention and who was the father of today's Cooperative Program, the method by which Southern Baptists pool their resources to fund their mission efforts. The award is given annually to a leader within the SBC who displays excellence and leadership in Southern Baptist life, as well as friendship and commitment to Union University. Past recipients include Jimmy Draper (2004), Adrian Rogers (2005), Morris Chapman (2006) and Frank Page (2007).

On November 11, 2010, Rainer received the Donald A. McGavran award for outstanding leadership in church growth from the Great Commission Research Network. According to the GCRN president Bob Whitesel, Rainer's "research and writings have been and continue to be key resources to those who care about church health and growth."

In 2010, Rainer was inducted into the Carl F. H. Henry Society of Fellows at Union University and provided Union's graduation keynote address. Rainer was also appointed to serve as a trustee board member for Union by action of the Tennessee Baptist Convention.

The Southern Baptist Theological Seminary awarded Rainer its Alumnus of the Year award in 2013 and the E.Y. Mullins Distinguished Denominational Service Award in 2014. In presenting the award, Southern's president, Albert Mohler, recognized Rainer "for his 'remarkable legacy of leadership' as pastor, scholar, teacher, and founding dean of the Billy Graham School, as well as for his role as author, speaker, and president of LifeWay Christian Resources of the Southern Baptist Convention."

== Speaking and teaching ==
Examples of his speaking and teaching engagements include:

- "Evangelism and Church Growth in the Southern Baptist Convention," Baptist Identity II Conference
- "The Church and Contemporary Culture," University of the Cumberlands.
- Christian Executive Officers (CEO) Fellowship
- The Commission on Evangelism

Rainer holds the title of Distinguished Professor of Evangelism and Church Growth (2006) at The Southern Baptist Theological Seminary, and also lectures at Southeastern Baptist Theological Seminary.

== Works ==
Rainer has written or co-written 27 books and more than 200 articles. His books and a selection of his articles include:

=== Books ===
- Rainer, Thom S., ed. (1989). Evangelism in the Twenty-First Century: the critical issues - Twenty-one contributors writing in honor of Lewis A. Drummond. Wheaton, IL: Harold Shaw Publisher. ISBN 978-0-877-88238-1. OCLC 19514886.
- ——— (1993). The Book of Church Growth: history, theology, and principles. Nashville, TN: Broadman Press. ISBN 978-0-805-41157-7. OCLC 26589881.
- ——— (1994). Eating the Elephant: bite-sized steps to achieve long-term growth in your church (1st ed.). Nashville, TN: B&H Publishing Group. ISBN 978-0-805-46140-4. OCLC 29703199.
- ——— (1995). Giant Awakenings: making the most of 9 surprising trends that can benefit your church. Nashville, TN: B&H Publishing Group. ISBN 978-0-805-46173-2. OCLC 31412089.
- ———; Silva, Michael (1996). Experiencing Revival: A Guide to Personal Renewal and Evangelistic Revival in Your Church. La Mirada, CA: Church Growth Institute. ISBN 978-1-570-52058-7.
- ———; Drummond, Lewis, eds. (1996). Biblical Affirmations for Evangelism. Minneapolis, MN: World Wide Publications. ISBN 0-89066-284-3.
- ——— (1996). Effective Evangelistic Churches: successful churches reveal what works, and what doesn't. Nashville, TN: B&H Publishing Group. ISBN 978-0-805-45402-4. OCLC 34410663.
- ——— (1997). The Bridger Generation: America's second largest generation, what they believe, how to reach them. Nashville, TN: B&H Publishing Group. ISBN 978-0-805-46296-8. OCLC 36746379.
- ———; Wagner, C. Peter; Towns, Elmer L. (1998). The Every Church Guide to Growth: how any plateaued church can grow. Nashville, TN: B&H Publishing Group. ISBN 978-0-805-40192-9. OCLC 38747534.
- ——— (1999). High expectations : the remarkable secret for keeping people in your church. Nashville, TN: B&H Publishing Group. ISBN 978-0-805-41266-6. OCLC 39335543.
- ——— (2001). Surprising Insights from the Unchurched. Grand Rapids, MI: Zondervan. ISBN 978-0-310-23648-1. OCLC 46678185.
- ——— (2003). The Unchurched Next Door: understanding faith stages as keys to sharing your faith. Grand Rapids, MI: Zondervan. ISBN 978-0-310-24860-6. OCLC 52203016.
- ———; Lawless, Charles E. (2003). Eating the Elephant: Leading the Established Church to Growth (Revised and expanded ed.). Syracuse, NY: Pinnacle Publishers. ISBN 978-0-974-23060-3. - updated version of the 1994 title
- ——— (2005). Breakout Churches: discover how to make the leap. Grand Rapids, MI: Zondervan. ISBN 978-0-310-25745-5. OCLC 54988771.
- ———; Lawless, Charles E., eds. (2005). The Challenge of the Great Commission. Syracuse, NY: Pinnacle Publishers. ISBN 978-0-974-23061-0.
- ——— (2005). The Unexpected Journey: conversations with people who turned from other beliefs to Jesus. Grand Rapids, MI: Zondervan. ISBN 978-0-310-25741-7. OCLC 60491957.
- ———; Geiger, Eric (2006). Simple Church: returning to God's process for making disciples. Nashville, TN: B&H Publishing Group. ISBN 9780805443905. OCLC 68810069.
- ———; Rainer, Art (2007). Raising Dad: What Fathers & Sons Learn from Each Other. Nashville, TN: B&H Publishing Group. ISBN 978-0-805-44391-2.
- ———; Rainer, Sam (2008). Essential Church: reclaiming a generation of dropouts. Nashville, TN: B&H Publishing Group. ISBN 978-0-805-44392-9. OCLC 209639048.
- ———; Akin, Daniel L. (2009). Vibrant Church: Becoming a Healthy Church in the 21st Century. Nashville, TN: B&H Publishing Group. ISBN 978-1-415-86541-5.
- ———; Rainer, Art (2009). Simple Life: time, relationships, money, God with Art Rainer. Nashville, TN: B&H Publishing Group. ISBN 978-0-805-44886-3. OCLC 316018625.
- ———; Stetzer, Ed (2010). Transformational Church: creating a new scorecard for congregations. Nashville, TN: B&H Publishing Group. ISBN 978-1-433-66930-9. OCLC 645665198.
- ———; Rainer, Jess W. (2011). The Millennials: connecting to America's largest generation. Nashville, TN: B&H Publishing Group. ISBN 978-1-433-67003-9. OCLC 695042457.
- ——— (2013). I Am a Church Member: Discovering the Attitude that Makes the Difference. Nashville, TN: B&H Publishing Group. ISBN 978-1-433-67973-5. OCLC 812571549.
- ——— (2014). Autopsy of a Deceased Church: 12 Ways to Keep Yours Alive. Nashville, TN: B&H Publishing Group. ISBN 978-1-433-68392-3. OCLC 880741442.
- ——— (2015). I Will: Nine Traits of the Outwardly Focused Christian. Nashville, TN: B&H Publishing Group. ISBN 978-1433687297. OCLC 894625832.
- ——— (2016). Who Moved My Pulpit?: Leading Change in the Church. Nashville, TN: B&H Publishing Group. ISBN 978-1433643873. OCLC 929545252.

=== Articles and contributions ===
- ——— (Spring 2005). "A Resurgence Not Yet Realized: Evangelistic Effectiveness in the Southern Baptist Convention Since 1979". Southern Baptist Journal of Theology. 9 (1): 54–69. - PDF
- ———. "What Price Evangelism?". Union University.
- ——— (10 May 2010). "Five Major Trends for Churches in America". christianpost.com.
- ———. "Seven Secrets of Healthy Churches". churchleaders.com.
- ———. "What Millennials Want in Leaders". sbcbaptistpress.org. Archived from the original on March 6, 2012.
- ———. "Three Root Causes of Stalled Spiritual Transformation". sermoncentral.com.
- ———. "Keys to Attracting the Unchurched". churchleaders.com.
- ——— (2016). "By the Numbers: What SBC Demographics Tell Us about our Past, Present, and Future". In Allen, Jason K. (ed.). The SBC and the 21st century. Nashville, TN: B&H Publishing Group. pp. 21–32. ISBN 978-1433644399. OCLC 945352301.

== See also ==
- List of Southern Baptist Convention affiliated people
