= LifeWay Christian Resources =

Baptist publishing house based in Nashville, Tennessee, US

Lifeway Christian Resources
- Type: Religious non-profit organization
- Industry: Publishing Christian media
- Founded: 1891; Incorporated on October 5, 1983 as the Sunday School Board of the Southern Baptist Convention.
- Founder: James Marion Frost
- Headquarters: Nashville, Tennessee, U.S.
- Key people: Joe Walker, interim President and CEO; Ben Mandrell, former president and CEO (2019-2025); Thom S. Rainer, former President and CEO (2005–2019); James L. Sullivan, the longest-tenured president in Lifeway’s history (1953–1975)
- Revenue: 1,023,433 United States dollar (2022)
- Total assets: 23,235,000 United States dollar (2022)
- Number of employees: 4,000
- Parent: Southern Baptist Convention
- Divisions: Five; see article
- Website: lifeway.com

Lifeway Christian Resources, based in Nashville, Tennessee, is the Christian media publishing and distribution division of the Southern Baptist Convention and provider of church business services.

Until the end of its physical retail presence in 2019 it was best known for its brick and mortar LifeWay Christian Stores, one of the two major American retailers of Christian books and products (the other being Mardel Christian & Education). Lifeway produces curriculums and Bible studies used in Sunday schools and other church functions. Lifeway publishes the Christian Standard Bible (the successor to the Holman Christian Standard Bible), as well as Christian books and commentaries through B&H Publishing. Lifeway has a research division that studies Protestant trends and provides contract research services. In addition, it distributes many Christian resources created by outside parties. It distributes and sells many church products such as communion supplies and upholstery. Lifeway also provides church business services.

While Lifeway is a non-profit and part of the Southern Baptist Convention, it receives no church funding through the SBC's cooperative program Instead, Lifeway is self-funded through the sales of its products.

Lifeway operated World Changers until it was shut down in 2020 because of the coronavirus pandemic. In April 2020, Lifeway's board voted to put the Ridgecrest Conference Center in Asheville, North Carolina, up for sale.

== History ==
The story of Lifeway Christian Resources begins in 1891, when James Marion Frost, a 43-year-old pastor, founded "The Sunday School Board of the Southern Baptist Convention" after that year's annual SBC meeting in Birmingham, Alabama. Frost carried a bold and untested vision, but he laid the foundation for what Lifeway would ultimately become. His early leadership was brief, ending in 1893, but his dream endured.

During the next three years, T. P. Bell took the helm (1893–1896). Fierce in conviction and unafraid of opposition, Bell fought tenaciously for the Board's legitimacy. He believed the work was essential to Baptist life and refused to compromise, even under intense criticism.

In 1896, J. M. Frost returned for a second, much longer term that stretched twenty years (1896–1916). Though he lacked complete clarity about the future, his renewed leadership solidified the mission and trajectory of the Board.

Upon Frost's departure in 1916, I. J. Van Ness became president and served for nearly two decades (1916–1935). Van Ness elevated the role of Christian education within the convention, recognizing that resources alone were not enough, and that Baptists needed to be trained, equipped, and formed. His influence helped shape the educational spirit that remains at Lifeway's core. In 1925, the Board began operating retail bookstores under the name "Baptist Book Store". According to Jeffrey Gros, the Sunday School Board was "one of the principal sources of literacy across the South."

Leadership then passed to T. L. Holcomb (1935–1953), a man who preferred preaching and revival ministry to the administrative demands of institutional life. Even as president, he remained a pastor at heart. His tenure emphasized Lifeway's fundamental connection to the local church, a value still cherished today.

In 1953, James L. Sullivan assumed the presidency and served for twenty-two years (1953–1975), making him the longest-tenured president in Lifeway's history. Sullivan guided the organization through significant transitions with unmatched knowledge of both the denomination and the Board. Under his leadership, the “LifeWay” imprint was first used around 1971 on some of its materials and as the name for retail stores in certain markets, reflecting an expansion of items sold which included items produced by others, some of whom were not Southern Baptist. His legacy was physically honored in downtown Nashville, where the Sullivan Tower was built and stood as a tribute to his lasting leadership and vision.

Gene Mims, former Lifeway Vice President, summarized Sullivan's impact: “He is arguably the greatest leader we ever had. He served in the transition of the greatest magnitude and moved easily between business and ministry. He knew the denomination like none before him and knew the Board and all the details of it. His hallmark position was to always keep the Board in the center, not the right and not to the left, of every issue and opportunity. We learn from him the lessons from the center.”

Sullivan was followed by Grady C. Cothen (1975–1984), whose background and love for Scripture fueled a spirit of innovation. Cothen led boldly and embraced new technologies and methods, encouraging the organization to dream big and take risks during a time of denominational change.

Next came Lloyd Elder (1984–1991), who inherited leadership during one of the most turbulent eras in Southern Baptist history. With the Convention undergoing fundamental shifts, Elder remained steady and diligent, determined to do all he could with what he had. His tenure exemplified perseverance and kingdom focus during difficult times.

In 1991, James T. Draper Jr. began a fifteen-year presidency (1991–2006). Draper's leadership was marked by relational warmth, pastoral care, and a deep love for church leaders. His legacy is rooted less in accomplishments and more in character. He embodied the belief that leadership flows from who one is, not merely what one does. From 1996 to 1998, the Board rebranded its stores under the LifeWay banner and officially changed its name. In 2002, LifeWay acquired Serendipity House, a publisher of Bible studies for small groups.

Thom S. Rainer succeeded Draper in 2006 and served until 2018. Rainer emphasized research, church revitalization, and the changing dynamics of ministry in a rapidly shifting cultural landscape. His twelve years saw Lifeway modernize and reposition itself for a digital future. During his tenure, in 2017, LifeWay moved out of the Draper Tower and the Sullivan Tower (named after President James L. Sullivan) into new headquarters in the Capitol View area of Nashville.

Following Rainer's retirement, Ben Mandrell became president in 2019. His leadership has spanned a period of transformation for Lifeway, including the challenges of the COVID-19 era, the relocation of the organization's headquarters, and a renewed emphasis on church-centric ministry. Mandrell's presidency (2019–2025) reflects innovation, adaptability, and a continued commitment to serving pastors and congregations.

In January 2019, LifeWay announced that it would cut staff and close some of its 170 stores. Two months later, it announced that it would be closing all of them and shift its focus to the e-commerce side of the business.

In January 2021, Lifeway unveiled a new logo, which made its name's w lowercase. Also in 2021, it was announced the building would be sold in favor of a smaller office as staff continued the trend of remote working.

== Divisions ==
=== Publishing ===
B&H is the primary publishing of Lifeway Christian Resources. B&H traces its publishing history to 1863, when the Sunday School Board was formed at the Southern Baptist Theological Seminary in Greenville, South Carolina. Some of its first leaders were John Albert Broadus and Basil Manly Jr. The first board and its publishing activities were absorbed by the Home Mission Board in 1873. The new Sunday School Board took over the publishing operations in 1891. By 1960, the board was using the Broadman imprint.

In 1979, the Sunday School Board acquired Bible publisher A. J. Holman from J. B. Lippincott & Co. Holman started by acquiring the publishing activities of the Sower family. In 1993, the Holman Bible Company and Broadman Press merged to become Broadman & Holman. The Broadman & Holman name was later shortened to B&H.

B&H currently publishes under several imprints, including flagship B&H Books (also called B&H Publishing), B&H Academic, B&H Kids, B&H Español and Holman Bible Publishers. The CSB Bible as well as several commentaries are published under Holman Bible Publishers. B&H Academic develops textbooks, educational resources and market-oriented works of biblical scholars, theologians, and Christian academics.

=== Lifeway Research ===
Lifeway Research, the research division of Lifeway, conducts polls on trends within Protestantism and Evangelicalism in North America. Lifeway partners with Outreach Magazine to produce the Outreach 100 — a report publicizing the 100 largest churches by attendance and by growth in the United States. Lifeway Research conducts a variety of polls and surveys on topics such as church attendance, church member's behaviors, public opinion on social issues, pastoral trends and other issues of pertinence to Christianity's influence in North America. It publishes its research findings through its website and through collaboration with multiple partners. It also publishes Facts and Trends, a publication highlighting research that specifically targets pastors and ministry leaders. Additionally, it publishes several books, podcasts and other resources disseminating their research finds. Lifeway Research offers custom research services for churches, parachurch organizations and ministries.

Lifeway Research has also developed several tools used by Southern Baptist churches and others that are designed to assess church members' spiritual growth, potential church revitalization efforts and church planting.

=== Former divisions ===
==== World Changers ====
World Changers was an organization that was an entity of LifeWay Student Ministries. It provided national youth work projects. During projects, students typically spent one week in repairing damaged homes. The missions agency for World Changers was the North American Mission Board until 2011, when LifeWay took over.

The organization's first service projects began in the summer of 1990. The host city of the first project was Briceville, Tennessee. In 1992, World Changers expanded abroad with a project in Ciudad Victoria, Mexico. For each project, youth and adults provided labor at their own expense for substandard homes. All participants were divided into crews for the week. At each work site, crews usually painted, reroofed, or performed other light construction jobs.

In January 2011, high school and college students volunteers of World Changers returned to Rock Hill, South Carolina, to continue to help by substantially improving homes in need throughout the city. World Changers planned to recruit as many as 350 volunteers and help as many as 33 homes in Rock Hill that year.

In 2020, the coronavirus pandemic caused World Changers to cease operations.

== Sales policy ==
Although Lifeway sells products created by non-SBC persons and entities, its products generally feature Christian teachings from a conservative perspective (consistent with the 2000 Baptist Faith & Message). Lifeway does not sell, and discontinues selling, works by authors who disagree with its policies. For example, it removed all works by author Jen Hatmaker in October 2016 after she had endorsed same-sex marriage.

Lifeway's ministry on the subject of sexuality and gender expression sees non-heterosexual identities as sinful, which require church members to be "ready when homosexuality devastates." That is generally consistent with Article XVIII of the Baptist Faith & Message (the doctrinal statement of the Southern Baptist Convention, LifeWay's parent), (Note: The congregationalist polity of the SBC causes it not to be binding on individual congregations.) but it does not specifically address topics of gender expression such as transgender and non-binary gender identities.

== Leadership ==
In February 2006, Thom Rainer became the president and CEO of LifeWay after he had served as dean of the Billy Graham School of Evangelism of the Southern Baptist Theological Seminary. He succeeded James T. Draper Jr. of the Fort Worth metro area, who had headed LifeWay from 1991 to 2006.

On August 29, 2018, Rainer announced his retirement from LifeWay effective within one year or once his replacement had been identified, whichever occurred first. Rainer resigned earlier than anticipated, on February 28, 2019, and Brad Waggoner was named acting president.

Ben Mandrell, a Southern Baptist pastor who had led churches in Tennessee and Colorado, was elected the 10th president and CEO of LifeWay in June 2019.. In August 2025, Mandrell left LifeWay to become the pastor of Bellevue Baptist Church.
