= Sullivan Tower =

Demolished building in Nashville, Tennessee

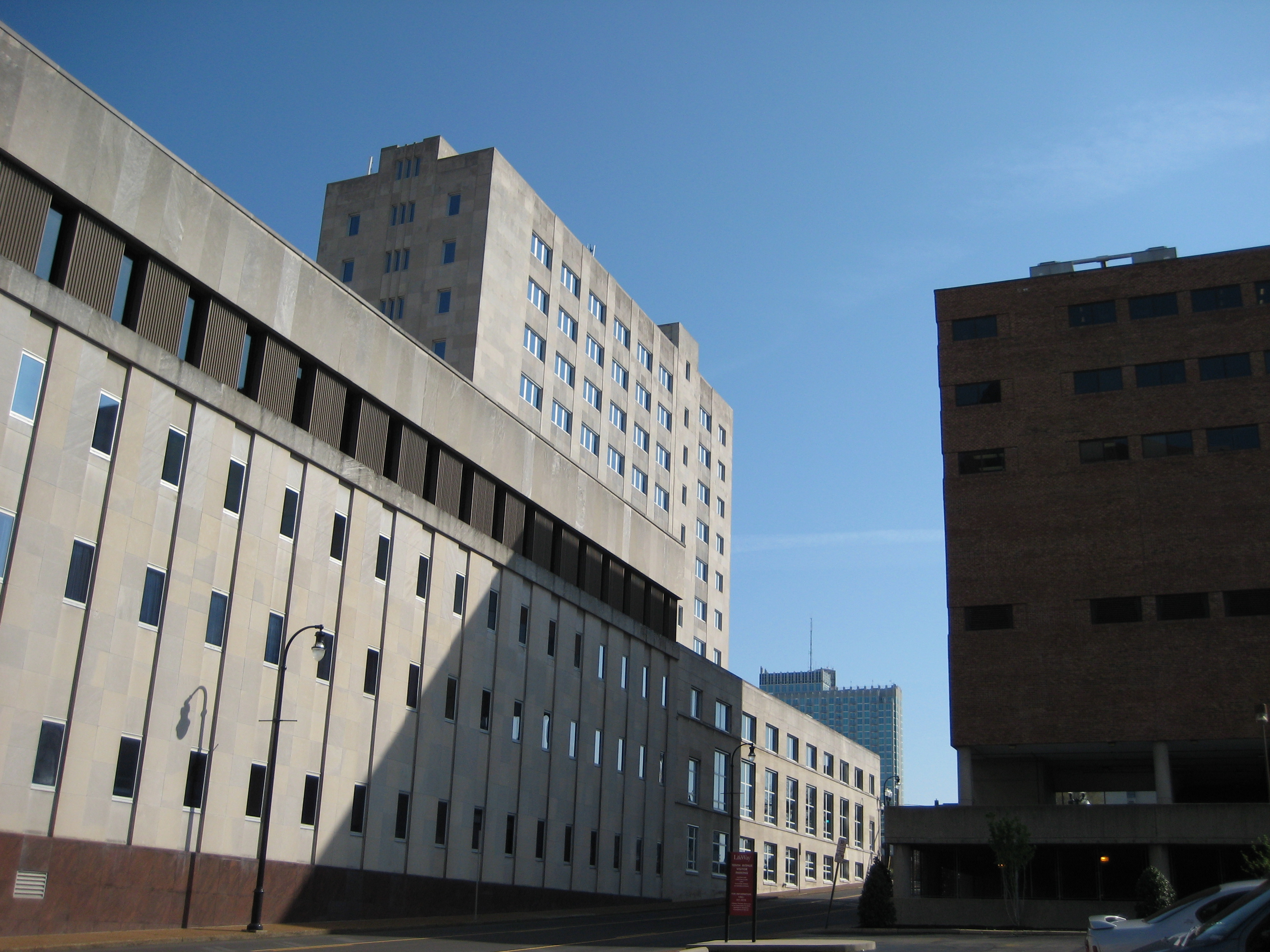
- The Sullivan Tower in 2008
- Interactive map of the Sullivan Tower area

General information
- Location: 127 9th Avenue North, Nashville, United States
- Coordinates: 36.1601°N 86.7841°W
- Construction started: 1940
- Completed: 1953
- Demolished: July 21, 2018

Height
- Height: 48.16 m (158.0 ft)

Technical details
- Floor count: 11

The Sullivan Tower was a high-rise building in Nashville, Tennessee, United States. It was named after Lifeway Christian Resource's President, James L. Sullivan. It was built between 1940—1956, and demolished in 2018.

== History ==
The first two floors of the Art Deco-style building were completed in 1940; nine more floors were added from 1950 to 1956 and later named for Sullivan.

It was part of the headquarters of the Southern Baptist Sunday School, later known as LifeWay Christian Resources, until November 2017, when the company moved to the Capitol View area.

The building was imploded by Southwest Value Partners, a real estate development company based in San Diego, California, on July 21, 2018. The developer is expected to develop part of the Nashville Yards where it stood.

== Architectural significance ==
The building was designed in the Art Deco architectural style. In 2017, after requests from local preservationists, the Nashville Metro Historical Commission recommended its inclusion on the National Register of Historic Places, to no avail.
