= James T. Draper Jr. =

American pastor (born 1935)

James Thomas Draper Jr.
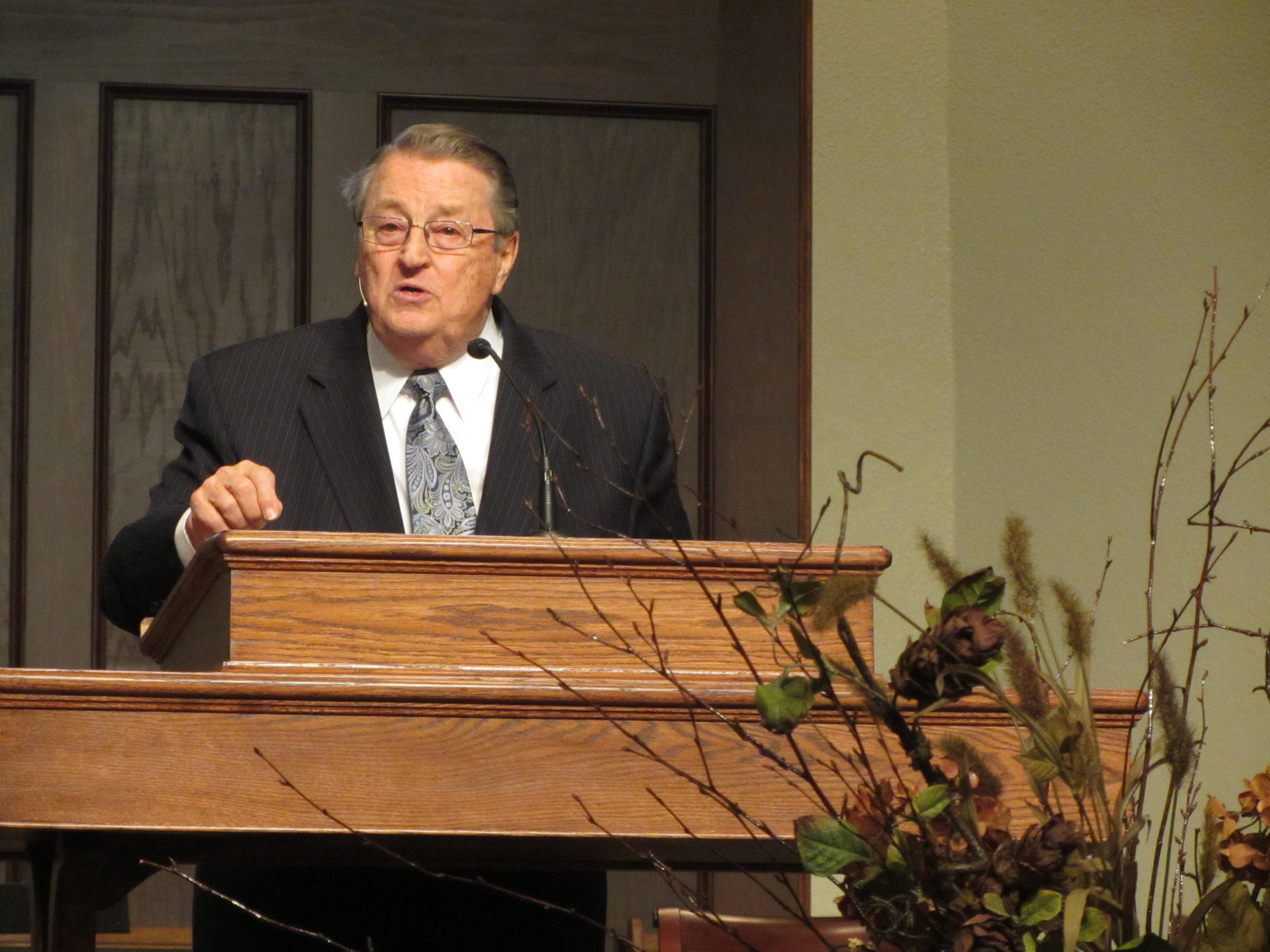
- Born: October 10, 1935 (age 90); Hartford, Arkansas
- Occupations: Southern Baptist clergyman; President of the Southern Baptist Convention, 1982 to 1984 Former president of LifeWay Christian Resources
- Years active: 1956 - present
- Spouse: Carol Ann Floyd
- Children: 3

James Thomas "Jimmy" Draper Jr. (born October 10, 1935) was president of the Southern Baptist Convention from 1982 to 1984 and as president of Lifeway Christian Resources from 1991 to 2006.

He signed the Manhattan Declaration in 2009.

He served on pastoral staff of numerous churches through Texas, Missouri, and Oklahoma, most notably as pastor of First Southern Baptist Church Del City Oklahoma, associate pastor at First Baptist Dallas under W. A. Criswell, and pastor of First Baptist Euless (now Cross City Church).

== See also ==
- List of Southern Baptist Convention affiliated people
- Southern Baptist Convention
- Southern Baptist Convention Presidents

== Bibliography ==
- Authority: The Critical Issues for Southern Baptists (1984) (ISBN 978-0800713898)
- We Believe: Living in the Light of God's Truth (2004) (ISBN 978-0633091293)
- Biblical Authority: The Critical Issue for the Body of Christ (2001) (ISBN 978-0805424539)
- Every Christian a Minister: Finding Joy and Fulfillment in Serving God (2001) (ISBN 978-0767393799)
- Lifeway Legacy: A Personal History of Lifeway Christian Resources and the Sunday School Board of the Southern Baptist Convention (2006) (ISBN 9780805431704)

Preceded by Bailey E. Smith	President of the Southern Baptist Convention; James Thomas Draper Jr. 1982–1984	Succeeded by Charles Stanley

Preceded by Lloyd Elder	President of LifeWay Christian Resources (formerly the Southern Baptist Sunday School Board); James Thomas Draper Jr. 1991–2006	Succeeded by Thom S. Rainer
