= Nashville Yards =

Nashville Yards is an 18-acre mixed-use development at the gateway to Nashville's central business district. Nashville Yards is bordered by the two main traffic corridors into downtown Nashville: Broadway and Church Street. The Gulch borders its south boundary.

In 2018, the Draper Tower and the Sullivan Tower were demolished to develop Nashville Yards, the site of Amazon's projected Operations Center of Excellence.

When complete, Nashville Yards will contain more than 3 million square feet of Class A and creative office space, 2,000 residential units, 365,000 square feet of retail, food and beverage, and entertainment space, 1,000 hotel rooms, 80,000 square feet group and convention meeting space, a 4,500 capacity music and event venue, and 7+ acres of activated open space.

Nashville Yards tenants and brand partnerships include Amazon, Anschutz Entertainment Group, Ascension Saint Thomas, Gallagher, Pinnacle Financial Partners, Bass Berry & Sims, Grand Hyatt, Marriott, Susan G. Komen, Sean Brock, Starbucks, and The Goddard School.

The Pinnacle is a 4,500-occupant live music and event venue, and a 415,000 square foot creative office and retail building at Nashville Yards.
