= Ibn Seena Academy =

Islamic school in Florida, United States

Coordinates: 28.3865°N 81.4999°W

Information
- Established: 2003; 23 years ago
- Grades: Pre-Kindergarten - Grade 12
- Website: www.isacademy.net

Ibn Seena Academy is an Islamic school in Orlando, Florida. It serves students from grades pre-kindergarten to 12th grade. It currently has articulation agreements with Mishkah University, UCF & USF for its high school program.

== History ==
In August 2003, Ibn Seena Academy opened its doors to the children of the Greater Orlando area. This Academy is unique because it offers a full academic curriculum together with a practical study of the Quran and Islamic Studies.
