= Staphylococcus hyicus =

Scientific classification
- Domain: Bacteria
- Kingdom: Bacillati
- Phylum: Bacillota
- Class: Bacilli
- Order: Caryophanales
- Family: Staphylococcaceae
- Genus: Staphylococcus
- Species: S. hyicus

Binomial name
- Staphylococcus hyicus Sompolinsky 1953; Devriese et al. 1978

Species of bacterium

Staphylococcus hyicus is a Gram-positive, facultatively anaerobic bacterium in the genus Staphylococcus. It consists of clustered cocci and forms white circular colonies when grown on blood agar. S. hyicus is a known animal pathogen. It causes disease in poultry, cattle, horses, and pigs. Most notably, it is the agent that causes porcine exudative epidermitis, also known as greasy pig disease, in piglets. S. hyicus is generally considered to not be zoonotic, however it has been shown to be able to cause bacteremia and sepsis in humans.

Staphylococcus hyicus commonly infects pig herds worldwide due to its global distribution. It can be found on asymptomatic carrier pigs at sites such as the skin, mucosa of nasal cavity, conjunctiva, and genitals (vagina of sow and prepuce of boar).

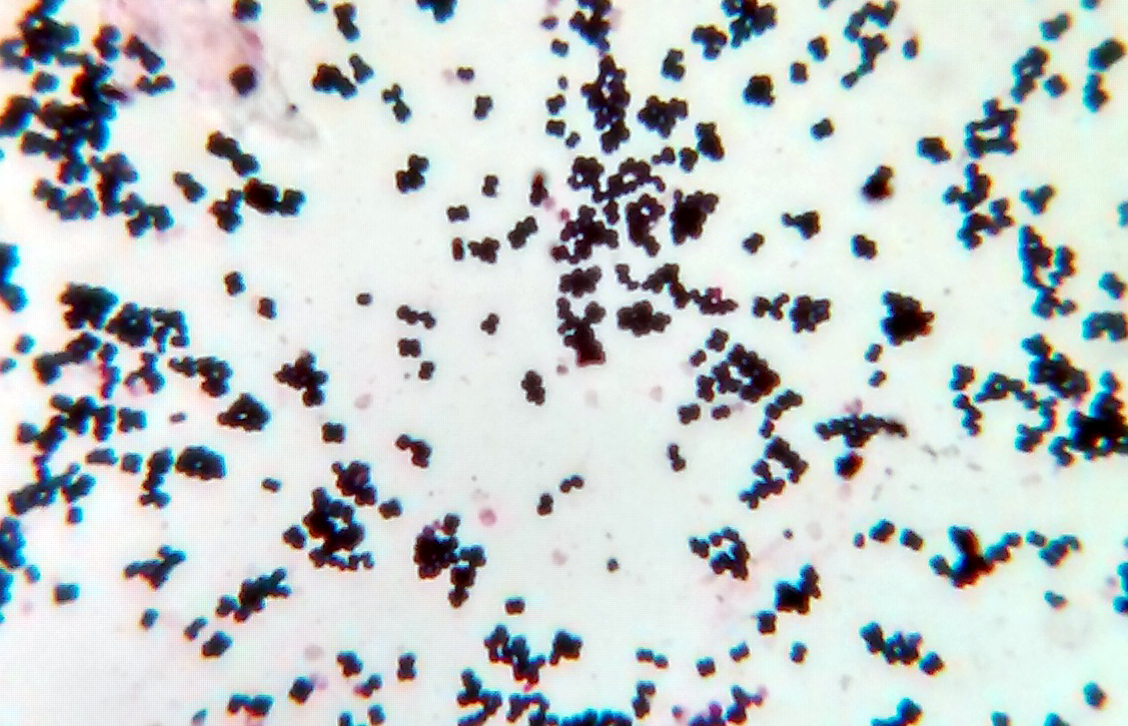
Gram positive cocci in clusters. This could be S. hyicus but it is impossible to tell without further diagnostics.

Infection with S. hyicus can be prevented with an autogenous vaccine. Managing the pigs can prevent disease and reduce the severity of an outbreak. Treatment includes topical sprays and oils as well as antibiotics, which should be tested to ensure S. hyicus is susceptible to them.

== Microbiology ==
=== History and taxonomy ===
The first known description of exudative epidermitis in pigs was in 1842 and the causative agent was later identified as Micrococcus hyicus in 1953. Based on phenotypic similarities, M. hyicus was moved to the Staphylococcus genus in 1965. The similar bacterium Staphylococcus chromogenes was considered a subspecies of S. hyicus until it was elevated to its own species in 1986. Other bacteria closely related to S. hyicus include S. schleiferi, S. intermedius, S. pseudintermedius, and S. felis.

=== Morphological characteristics ===
Staphylococcus hyicus, like other members of the Staphylococcus genus, is a gram-positive coccus that forms clusters. It is facultatively anaerobic. Six different serotypes have been identified to date. The bacterium is quite resistant and can remain viable in the environment for long periods of time without drying out.

On blood agar, S. hyicus colonies are medium in size (1 to 3 mm in diameter) and appear white, opaque, convex, and circular. Rarely, some have been observed to appear yellow on sheep blood agar but the vast majority of colonies do not produce any pigment. S. hyicus colonies normally do not show hemolysis on blood agar however they do show a characteristic small zone of hemolysis on chocolate agar.

=== Biochemistry and identification ===
The identification of S. hyicus and differentiation from similar organisms may require extensive biochemical testing. Most strains of S. hyicus are coagulase positive; however, some strains isolated from both pigs and cattle have been found to be coagulase negative so it can be considered coagulase variable. This variability can make it difficult to tell apart from similar bacteria such as Staphlococcus agnetis without PCR based methods or genotyping. S. hyicus is catalase positive and oxidase negative. It also normally shows DNase activity.

Staphylococcus hyicus produces a bacteriolytic enzyme and a S. hyicus-specific teichoic acid. Porcine strains express surface receptors for immunoglobulin G but these are not commonly expressed by bovine strains. Most strains are capable of fermentation of glucose, fructose, mannose, lactose, and trehalose but not maltose.

Differentiation of S. hyicus from other members of the genus can be done based on the sequence of its 16S rRNA gene or thermonuclease (nuc) gene. The complete genome (2,472,129 base pairs) of S. hyicus ATCC 11249^{T} was also sequenced and annotated in 2015.

== Virulence and antimicrobial resistance ==
=== Virulence ===
Division of S. hyicus into virulent and avirulent strains is based on the production of an exfoliative toxin (virulence factor), which produces the clinical presentation of exudative epidermitis, as these toxins specifically target the stratum granulosum and stratum spinosum. S. hyicus exfoliative toxin (SHET) producing strains are further divided into plasmid carrying (SHETB) and plasmidless (SHETA). It was found that genes encoding four different exfoliative toxins (ExhA, ExhB, ExhC and ExhD) were homologous to SHETB. These exotoxins are similar to the exfoliative toxin (ETA, ETB, ETD) that Staphylococcus aureus produces. The mechanism of action is via serine protease-like exfoliative toxins. Swine desmoglein 1 (Dsg1) is a desmosomal intracellular adhesion molecule that is cleaved by the exfoliative toxins produced by S. hyicus allowing for separation of stratum granulosum and stratum spinosum. Other virulence factors have been reported, the production of protein A with binding sites for immunoglobulin G (IgG) allows for evasion from phagocytes, coagulase production to form clots, surface fibronectin-binding proteins for adhesion and production of staphylokinase and lipase to evade host defences. These virulence factors in combination with other factors like age, being immunocompromised, genetic susceptibility, trauma (physical, chemical, solar), disease status and environmental conditions can vary the expression of exudative epidermitis experienced.

=== Antimicrobial resistance ===
Staphylococcus hyicus has frequently been reported to be resistant to a range of antimicrobial agents. S. hyicus has demonstrated resistance to penicillin, streptomycin, tetracycline, trimethoprim, erythromycin, sulfonamides, lincomycin and chloramphenicol. Further resistance testing of S. hyicus isolates found high resistance to penicillin, macrolides, tetracycline, sulfonamides and streptomycin, but S. hyicus was sensitive to ciprofloxacin, chloramphenicol and florfenicol. This multi-drug resistance has been linked to certain genes. For beta-lactam resistance, the mechanism is by altering penicillin binding protein production which is encoded by mecA. Further, it has been suggested that resistance may be passed between staphylococcal species especially when treating pigs prophylactically. Other implicated plasmid resistance genes are tet(L) for tetracyclines, erm(C) for macrolides, lincosamides and streptogramins and the pS194-like str gene is for chloramphenicol and streptomycin resistance. Genetic elements for resistance to methicillin and zinc have been reported, therefore susceptibility testing is recommended before treatment.

== Disease in all species ==
Staphylococcus hyicus is most noted for causing disease in pigs but has been shown to cause problems in other species as well.

=== Swine ===
Staphylococcus hyicus is the causative agent of exudative epidermitis in piglets. This condition is commonly referred to as greasy pig disease. It gets this nickname from its classic appearance of scabs all over the body. It most often presents in nursery age piglets or younger, and can lead to death as the piglet loses fluid through the skin and becomes dehydrated. The morbidity varies greatly but can be up to 80% in some instances. Lesions in the form of macules are usually most severe around the lips, nose, and ears. These lesions are characteristic in their release of oily exudate. As it progresses to the entire body, treatment becomes more difficult. The bacteria can normally be present on the skin, in the nose as well as the vagina and prepuce. For this reason, it is considered endemic in most herds, though the pathogenesis may be sporadic. It can also cause bacteremia and sepsis in piglets which if they recover can result in poor growth that can affect them for life. S. hyicus has also been noted as a cause of arthritis in young pigs in the absence of any signs of exudative epidermitis.

=== Cattle ===
The bacterial species has been isolated from milk in dairy herds and is one of the more uncommon causes of contagious mastitis in the Staphylococcus species. This type of mastitis can be very difficult to control as cows can spread it without being clinically ill. This bacteria most commonly causes persistent intramammary infections, which can lead to the cow needing to be culled from the herd. This bacteria can also cause a skin disease in cattle which leads to a mange-like syndrome most common in young adult cattle.

=== Poultry ===
Staphylococcus hyicus has been rarely reported in poultry animals, but is thought to be a cause of bacterial chondro-necrosis along with other species such as Staphlococcus agnetis. Lameness is a cause for concern in the industry and contributes to economic losses as well as welfare issues. It is considered to be a normal part of poultry skin flora and may be a contributor to fowlpox. This bacteria has also been cultured from chicken meat labelled for human consumption, and could be a cause of Staphylococcus food poisoning. In one study the strains of S. hyicus found in retailed chicken meat were resistant to every antibiotic tested. This is concerning because it means these resistant bacteria are in contact with people and could have large health implications if infected.

=== Horses ===
In horses, S. hyicus is not a common pathogen but when it does infect, it affects the skin of the distal limbs. This condition can be referred to as summer eczema or grease heel and it results in scabs and hair loss. It can heal on its own or can be easily treated with antibiotics the bacteria is susceptible to. In this way it is often a cosmetic issue or a slight discomfort, and is not life threatening like in other species. S. hyicus is almost exclusively seen in lesions and is not a normal part of the healthy equine skin flora.

=== Humans ===
Humans being affected by S. hyicus is rare and for this reason is not considered a common zoonosis. There is a higher risk of people being infected if they work in close contact with infected pigs frequently, such as one case reported in a farmer with a previously infected foot causing bacteremia. Another notable case is a man who was diagnosed with a case of infectious spondylodiscitis. A culture of his infected bone and blood was confirmed to have S. hyicus present, suggesting it was the causative agent. This case is concerning because he was considered immunocompetent, which is often not the case for rare bacterial infections. There have been very few human cases found other than these rare instances, and it is not currently considered a risk to human health.

== Role of Staphylococcus hyicus in exudative epidermitis (greasy pig disease) ==
=== Epidemiological background ===
Endemic infection with S. hyicus is a common finding worldwide; however the development of exudative epidermitis is based on opportunity and the age of the pigs involved Rarely there are exudative epidermitis outbreaks with whole herds affected. However, in cases of outbreak it is often the youngest whom are most severely affected with high mortality and morbidity. A predilection for the outbreak of disease include newly founded herds, gilt litters, and an overall diminished passive transfer of antibodies for S. hyicus from sow to piglets; and for the individual animal, those that have open wounds, sores or have been exposed to a form of trauma or irritation are predisposed to develop an infection of S. hyicus. Additional factors that may increase individual animal susceptibility to S. hyicus-caused exudative epidermitis include parasitism, viral infection, and other immunity issues, nutritional deficiencies, issues with management and hygiene practices, and possible genetic susceptibility.

=== Pathogenesis ===
Early clinical signs can include anorexia, lethargy, and reddening of skin specifically in the inguinal and axillary regions.

Epidermal inflammatory processes accompanied by exudate are attributed to exfoliative toxins of S. hyicus. Exfoliative toxins will cleave swine desmoglein-1 (Dsg1); therefore, creating an opportunity for epidermal bacterial invasion with the splitting of the stratum spinosum and stratum granulosum. With bacterial invasion, 1 to 2 cm (diameter) brown lesions will begin to appear within the 24 to 48 hour range; and lesions will first appear cranially before progressing posteriorly as crusting ulcers with possible formation of suppurative folliculitis. However, in younger animals that may die within 3 to 5 days, crusting ulcers may only be situated in the cranial region due to lack of time to progress. Often the young piglets severely affected by S. hyicus causing exudative epidermitis die from dehydration characterized by a loss of protein serum and electrolytes.

Besides the characteristic brown lesions of the dermis, ulcerative lesions can form in the mucosa of the mouth and on the tongue. Additionally, peripheral lymph nodes will swell, and internal organs such as the kidney and lungs may become distended.

==== Areas of the body affected ====
- Head, neck, feet, general body, mouth and tongue
- Kidneys and ureters may become distended with mucus and debris collection; additionally lungs may accumulate congestion during the disease process

=== Diagnosis ===
Exudative epidermitis is often fatal in piglets especially those within the 1 to 5 week-old range as they are most at risk for the development of the acute disease form. As animals age the likelihood of developing the acute disease form lessens therefore mortality decreases; however, producers may note a reduction in feed conversion and weight gain post-disease recovery.

Diagnosis of exudative epidermitis is often made based on the characteristic brown lesions that progress to crusting ulcers along with the other clinical signs mentioned above.

== Prevention of disease ==
=== Vaccine ===
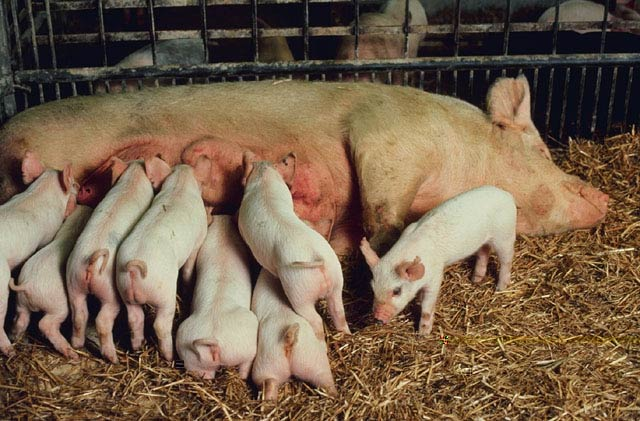
Managing the barn conditions and the welfare of the piglets can reduce the spread of S. hyicus.

A vaccine can be used for prevention of infection with S. hyicus. The vaccine is made using the genes that encode exfoliative toxin type B (ExhB) from S. hyicus strains. Since there is no commercial vaccine available yet, the vaccine used is an autogenous vaccine with the strain of S. hyicus that is currently affecting the herd of pigs to ensure immunity is developed to the strain within the barn. Vaccination reduces the chance that pigs will die from the disease and can help reduce the use of antimicrobials to treat exudative epidermitis. Vaccinated sows can pass on antibodies to the piglets so that the piglets have some passive immunity to S. hyicus.

=== Management of pigs ===
Staphylococcus hyicus can enter the skin of pigs through any cut. Managing the pigs so they are unable to bite each other or ensuring the flooring is soft can decrease infection. The barn should be disinfected and cleaned regularly to ensure bacteria cannot grow as easily. Any new sows entering the barn should be washed to reduce contamination. When the first signs of disease are noticed, changing the bedding or moving the pigs to a new stall can reduce contamination. Using sterile needles for injections and controlling mange may also decrease infection. Exudative epidermitis is contagious between pigs and quick isolation can reduce the chance of the disease spreading. Ensuring biosecurity of the farm and isolating any new pigs before introducing them to the herd can reduce transmission. For young piglets, reducing the chance of chilling can impact how sick the piglets will get. Keeping the barn dry and clean as well as ensuring there is adequate ventilation and humidity can decrease the amount of S. hyicus that can grow in the barn and possibly infect pigs.

== Treatment ==
Treatments for exudative epidermitis include antibiotics given topically or injected, disinfectants, and topical oils which can relieve symptoms. In farms which are "antibiotic-free", pigs which fall ill are removed from the production system rather than treated. Farmers generally treat infected pigs topically with sprays or oils. Sprays can have antibiotics such as novobiocin and procaine penicillin G. Any pigs which are dehydrated may need fluids and electrolytes to become rehydrated. Rehydration is crucial as dehydration is the common cause of death in infected pigs.

Staphylococcus hyicus was found to be susceptible to many antibiotics including norfloxacin, ciprofloxacin, ampicillin, cephalexin, oxytetracycline, and gentamicin. These antibiotics could be used to treat pigs infected with S. hyicus. Novobiocin and enrofloxacin have been shown to be effective in controlling Staphylococcus hyicus in vitro. S. hyicus is often susceptible to vancomycin as this antibiotic is still effective against most methicillin-resistant Staphylococci. With antibiotic resistance increasing in all bacteria, sending samples to a diagnostic lab for susceptibility testing is important for choosing the right antibiotic in that case. Ensuring bacteria do not develop resistance to many antimicrobials is important for both animal and human health. This is especially true in food animals, such as pigs, because resistant bacteria responsible for many common foodborne illnesses in people may be linked to animal antimicrobial resistance.
