= Staphylococcus massiliensis =

Scientific classification
- Domain: Bacteria
- Kingdom: Bacillati
- Phylum: Bacillota
- Class: Bacilli
- Order: Caryophanales
- Family: Staphylococcaceae
- Genus: Staphylococcus
- Species: S. massiliensis

Binomial name
- Staphylococcus massiliensis Al Masalma, Raoult, and Roux 2010

Species of bacterium

Staphylococcus massiliensis is a Gram-positive, coagulase-negative member of the bacterial genus Staphylococcus consisting of clustered cocci. Strains of this species were first isolated from a human brain abscess and were found to be most closely related to Staphylococcus piscifermentans, Staphylococcus condimenti, Staphylococcus carnosus subsp. carnosus, Staphylococcus carnosus subsp. utilis, and Staphylococcus simulans. A subsequent study found that S. massiliensis may actually be part of the human skin microbiome and may have been a contaminant of brain abscess-derived samples.
