= Staphylococcus delphini =

Scientific classification
- Domain: Bacteria
- Kingdom: Bacillati
- Phylum: Bacillota
- Class: Bacilli
- Order: Bacillales
- Family: Staphylococcaceae
- Genus: Staphylococcus
- Species: S. delphini

Binomial name
- Staphylococcus delphini Varaldo et al. 1988

Species of bacterium

Staphylococcus delphini is a Gram-positive, coagulase-positive member of the bacterial genus Staphylococcus consisting of single, paired, and clustered cocci (round bacteria). Strains of this species were originally isolated from aquarium-raised dolphins suffering from skin lesions.

== History ==
The first strains of Staphylococcus delphini were discovered originally in 1975 when two strains were isolated from dolphins suffering from infected wounds. Based on both phenetic and genomic data, the basis of the new species Staphylococcus delphini was established. Staphylococcus delphini was originally distinguished other staphylococci by its production of coagulase, phosphatase, and heat-labile deoxyribonuclease; its carbohydrate reaction pattern; its bacteriolytic activity pattern; its profile of penicillin-binding proteins; and the bacteria's fairly large ratio of G + C nucleotides in its genome.

== Microbiology ==
Staphylococcus delphini is a coagulase-positive bacterial pathogen, relative to other members of the Staphylococcus intermedius group (SIG). Other members of this group include S. cornubiensis, S. intermedius sensu stricto, and S. pseudintermedius. The members of this group have a relatively narrow host range, mainly comprising animals such as horses, ferrets, minks, and others. Despite this norm, there has been reported cases of S. delphini in humans. S. delphini and other staphylococci in its group are able to become resistant to certain antimicrobial drugs. An example of this would be an isolate of S. delphini found in a horse that was resistant to erythromycin while other isolates of the same genus were susceptible to all antimicrobial drugs that were tested. Regarding the classification of this pathogen, S. delphini has been divided into two groups (A and B) with the hosts of group A typically consisting of mustelidae such as mink, ferrets, and badgers, whereas group B hosts remain unknown.

== Infection of humans ==
Until recently, there had been zero known diagnosed cases of Staphylococcus delphini infecting humans. In 2019, a case study was done on a 57-year-old woman who developed an open wound after having a partial gastrectomy. When coming back to the hospital three months post-op, she was swabbed and this culture was ultimately identified to be Staphylococcus delphini. This was notable as the patient claimed to only have had contact with her cat, an organism not known to be a host of Staphylococcus delphini. The extent of how these infections might affect humans still very unknown as nothing arose from this particular case.

== Symptoms ==
The first reported symptom of Staphylococcus Delphini was reported in 1988 as two dolphins were found to have skin lesions. A large farm of mink were found to have been infected with a bacterial cocci that expanded the small intestines of these mink when their organs were later examined. Glutinous fluid that was discovered was later identified to be a Staphylococcus intermedius group (SIG) member and was classified as S. delphini. The direct source of this fluid and diarrhea wasn't determined, but scientists claimed that it was a result of S. delphini in the intestines of these mink. In the first reported case of S. delphini in humans, the patient reportedly developed a gastric ulcer which was later treated and tested. Upon evaluation of the bacteria that had been accumulating in the patient, examiners found a colonization of S. delphini in the patient.

== Treatment ==
While there are few treatments for Staphylococcus delphini, one that has been lightly researched is the use of Tylosin (TYL). Tylosin is an antibiotic, used in veterinary medicine, and is a feed additive that halts the reproduction of bacteria. Scientists have found that Tylosin often treats mink, but there is no evidence-based treatment regimen that for Staphylococcus delphini. Mink are currently given Tylosin daily as a means of treatment, in a small dosage of 10 mg/kg. One study, researching the effects of upping the dosage of Tylosin, found that the correct dosage to fight a Staphylococcus delphini infection would be between 250 and 500 times the current dosage of 10 mg/kg.
