= Staphylococcus simiae =

Scientific classification
- Domain: Bacteria
- Kingdom: Bacillati
- Phylum: Bacillota
- Class: Bacilli
- Order: Bacillales
- Family: Staphylococcaceae
- Genus: Staphylococcus
- Species: S. simiae

Binomial name
- Staphylococcus simiae Pantůček et al. 2005

Species of bacterium

Staphylococcus simiae is a Gram-positive, coagulase-negative member of the bacterial genus Staphylococcus consisting of clustered cocci. This species was originally isolated from the gastrointestinal tract of South American squirrel monkeys, Saimiri sciureus, and found to be genetically similar to S. aureus, but more biochemically similar to S. piscifermentans. A draft genome of S. simiae was sequenced.
