= Staphylococcus microti =

Scientific classification
- Domain: Bacteria
- Kingdom: Bacillati
- Phylum: Bacillota
- Class: Bacilli
- Order: Bacillales
- Family: Staphylococcaceae
- Genus: Staphylococcus
- Species: S. microti

Binomial name
- Staphylococcus microti Nováková et al. 2010

Species of bacterium

Staphylococcus microti is a Gram-positive, coagulase-negative member of the bacterial genus Staphylococcus consisting of clustered cocci. This species was originally isolated from viscera of the common vole, Microtus arvalis. It is genetically similar to Staphylococcus rostri.
