= Arbonne International =

American multi-level marketing company

- Type: Multi-level marketing
- Industry: Cosmetics and nutritional supplements
- Founded: 1980, Orem, Utah
- Founder: Petter Mørck
- Headquarters: Irvine, California, United States
- Area served: North America, Commonwealth nations, Poland, Switzerland
- Parent: Groupe Rocher
- Website: arbonne.com

Arbonne International, LLC, known as Arbonne, is an American multi-level marketing company founded in 1980 in the United States by Norwegian entrepreneur Petter Mørck. Its product lines include vegan skincare, cosmetics, and nutrition. Arbonne's CEO is Jennifer Orlando, who succeeded Tyler Whitehead in July 2023. Arbonne is headquartered in Irvine, California, US, with US offices in Chatsworth, California, Greenwood, Indiana, Addison, Texas, and international offices in Australia, Canada, New Zealand, Poland, and the United Kingdom.

== History ==
Founded in Orem, Utah, United States by Mørck in 1980, Arbonne is named after the Swiss village of Arbon. Mørck had worked in the Norwegian skincare industry since 1965. In 1975, feeling the ingredients used were harmful to the skin, he moved to Arbon and started working on his skincare line with Pierre Bottiglieri, an employee of Laboratoires Cosmetiques Arval.

The first headquarters were located in Orem, Utah, moving to Lake Forest, Ca in 1984. Mørck was active in the company until his death in 2008. His son, Stian Mørck, is currently Brand Ambassador. Rita Davenport became the company's first President from 1991 to 2011. Arbonne became a subsidiary of Levlad, Inc., which became the main manufacturer of Arbonne products around 2004. In 2005, both companies were acquired by Harvest Partners, which dubbed the new acquisition Natural Products Group, LLC. In February 2018, Groupe Rocher, Paris, agreed to acquire Arbonne International and Nature's Gate from Natural Products Group.

The company made $200 million in sales in 2004. In 2005 there were 434,000 independent consultants, increasing to 612,000 in 2006. In 2006, Arbonne established distribution center in Greenwood, Indiana. Between 2007 and 2009, the number of the company's consultants fell from 1.3 million to under 800,000. In January 2010, Natural Products Group LLC filed for bankruptcy protection in order to reduce company debts. Harvest Partners were no longer involved, with Arbonne's new ownership being a combination of banks and private equity firms.

In 2006, Arbonne opened for business in Canada, then Australia in 2007, and the United Kingdom in 2008. In 2014, the company launched Arbonne Poland, and then New Zealand in 2016.

In March 2018, Arbonne was acquired by Groupe Rocher.

== Products ==
Formulations are created in-house with the collaboration of third party manufacturers.

== Business model ==
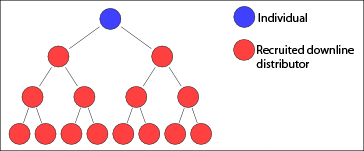
Multi-level marketing tree diagram

Arbonne is structured on a multi-level marketing model. The products are sold via home-based businesses owned and operated by independent consultants. Arbonne is a member of the Direct Selling Association.

In 2012, The Arbonne Charitable Foundation was registered as a charity to support programs to help teenagers build and increase their self-confidence. The Foundation has charitable status within the U.S., Canada, Australia and the UK.

== Legal action and FTC warning ==
Arbonne was sued by the Equal Employment Opportunity Commission for refusing to employ a deaf woman, a violation of the Americans with Disabilities Act. The company paid a $30,000 fine to settle the suit. In April 2020, 10 multi-level marketing companies, including Arbonne, received a warning from the Federal Trade Commission that ordered them to "remove and address the claims that they or their participants are making about their products’ ability to treat or prevent coronavirus disease or about the earnings people who have recently lost income can make, or both."

In May 2017, Cynthia and Michael Dagnall filed a lawsuit against Arbonne in the Orange County Superior Court. They alleged that the company was an illegal pyramid scheme. The suit was dismissed on March 20, 2018.

== Recalls ==
In January 2009, Arbonne voluntarily recalled some production lots of branded peanut butter cups. This was due to the risk of possible Salmonella serotype Typhimurium contamination of peanut-based products consigned from a Georgia processing plant.

In September 2009, Arbonne voluntarily recalled a production lot of branded foaming sea salt scrub, due to the risk of contamination with Pseudomonas aeruginosa bacteria.

In January 2013, Health Canada advised of Arbonne's voluntary recall of one batch of branded facial moisturizer for men. Arbonne's testing found that the batch contained the bacterium Aerococcus viridans.

In January 2014, the Australian Competition & Consumer Commission (ACCC) recalled sample tubes of branded day cream due to the presence of the bacterium Enterobacter gergoviae.

In June 2016, Arbonne voluntarily recalled multiple lots of branded liquid eye liner. The products contained unacceptable levels of the bacteria Staphylococcus saprophyticus, Staphylococcus xylosus, and Staphylococcus lentus.

In October 2017, the ACCC recalled one lot of branded body wash due to unacceptable levels of Staphylococcus cohnii.
