= Staphylococcus pettenkoferi =

Scientific classification
- Domain: Bacteria
- Kingdom: Bacillati
- Phylum: Bacillota
- Class: Bacilli
- Order: Bacillales
- Family: Staphylococcaceae
- Genus: Staphylococcus
- Species: S. pettenkoferi

Binomial name
- Staphylococcus pettenkoferi Trülzsch et al. 2007

Species of bacterium

Staphylococcus pettenkoferi is a bacterial species belonging to the genus Staphylococcus. Named in honour of Max von Pettenkofer, 1818–1901, German pioneer in the field of hygiene and public health, it was described in 2007 and is a member of the bacterial genus Staphylococcus, consisting of spherical, Gram-positive, nonmotile, non-spore-forming, facultative anaerobic bacteria. It is coagulase-negative and is probably a commensal organism on the skin of humans.

== Description ==
Colonies are 1–2 mm in diameter, sometimes showing yellow pigmentation when grown at ambient temperature.

== Clinical ==
Like other coagulase-negative staphylococci, S. pettenkoferi only rarely causes disease, but may occasionally cause infection in patients whose immune system is compromised. Most S. pettenkoferi strains have been isolated from the skin or from blood cultures of patients in Germany and Belgium. Recently, S. pettenkoferi was identified as the cause of osteomyelitis in a diabetic foot infection in France.
