= Staphylococcus lentus =

Scientific classification
- Domain: Bacteria
- Kingdom: Bacillati
- Phylum: Bacillota
- Class: Bacilli
- Order: Bacillales
- Family: Staphylococcaceae
- Genus: Staphylococcus
- Species: S. lentus

Binomial name
- Staphylococcus lentus (Kloos et al. 1976) Schleifer et al. 1983

Species of bacterium

Staphylococcus lentus is a Gram-positive, oxidase-positive, coagulase-negative member of the bacterial genus Staphylococcus consisting of clustered cocci. The species was originally classified as a subspecies; its name is a combination derived from Staphylococcus sciuri subsp. lentus.

Of all studied S. sciuri subspecies, only S. lentus has been found to use the trisaccharide raffinose.
