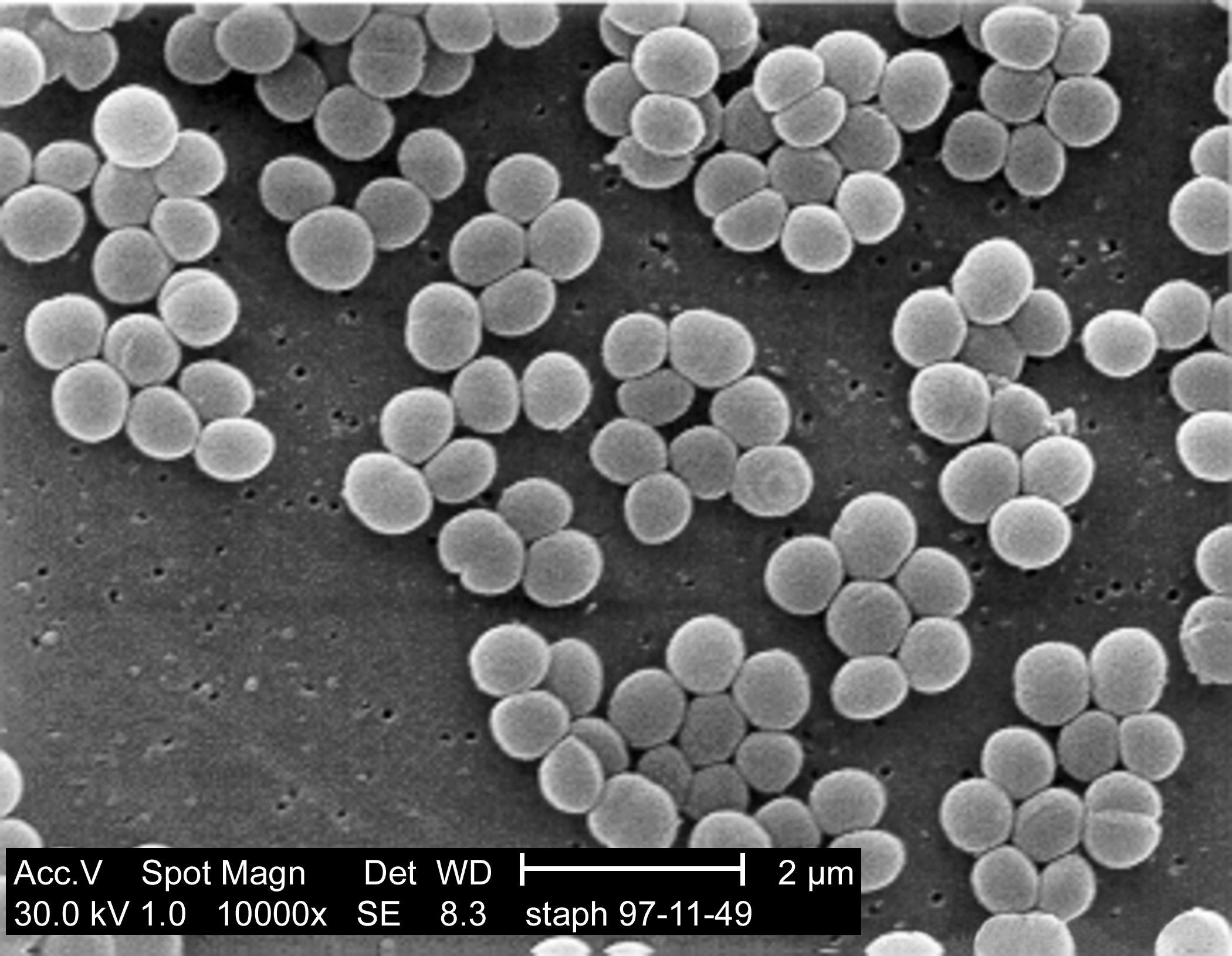
- Scanning electron micrograph of S. aureus colonies: Note the grape-like clustering common to Staphylococcus species.

Scientific classification
- Domain: Bacteria
- Kingdom: Bacillati
- Phylum: Bacillota
- Class: Bacilli
- Order: Caryophanales
- Family: Staphylococcaceae
- Genus: Staphylococcus; Rosenbach 1884

Species
- S. agnetis; S. americanisciuri; S. argensis; S. argenteus; S. arlettae; S. aureus; S. auricularis; S. borealis; S. brunensis; S. caeli; S. caledonicus; S. canis; S. capitis; S. caprae; S. carnosus; S. caseolyticus; S. chromogenes; S. coagulans; S. cohnii; S. condimenti; S. cornubiensis; S. croceilyticus; S. debuckii; S. delphini; S. devriesei; S. durrellii; S. edaphicus; S. epidermidis; S. equorum; S. felis; S. fleurettii; S. gallinarum; S. haemolyticus; S. hsinchuensis; S. hominis; S. hyicus; S. intermedius; S. jettensis; S. kloosii; S. lentus; S. lentus; S. lloydii; S. lutrae; S. marylandisciuri; S. massiliensis; S. microti; S. muscae; S. nepalensis; S. pasteuri; S. petrasii; S. pettenkoferi; S. piscifermentans; S. pragensis; S. pseudintermedius; S. pseudoxylosus; S. pulvereri; S. ratti; S. rostri; S. roterodami; S. saccharolyticus; S. saprophyticus; S. schleiferi; S. schweitzeri; S. sciuri; S. shinii; S. simiae; S. simulans; S. singaporensis; S. stepanovicii; S. succinus; S. taiwanensis; S. vitulinus; S. warneri; S. xylosus

= Staphylococcus =

Genus of Gram-positive bacteria

Staphylococcus, from Ancient Greek σταφυλή (staphulḗ), meaning "bunch of grapes", and κόκκος (kókkos), meaning "kernel" or "Kermes", is a genus of Gram-positive bacteria in the family Staphylococcaceae from the order Bacillales. Under the microscope, they appear spherical (cocci), and form in grape-like clusters. Staphylococcus species are facultative anaerobic organisms (capable of growth both aerobically and anaerobically).

The name was coined in 1880 by Scottish surgeon and bacteriologist Alexander Ogston (1844–1929), following the pattern established five years earlier with the naming of Streptococcus. It combines the prefix "staphylo-" (from Ancient Greek: σταφυλή, romanized: staphylē, lit. 'bunch of grapes'), and suffixed by the New Latin: coccus, lit. 'spherical bacterium' (from Ancient Greek: κόκκος, romanized: kókkos, lit. 'grain, seed, berry').

Staphylococcus was one of the leading infections in hospitals and many strains of this bacterium have become antibiotic resistant. Despite strong attempts to get rid of them, staphylococcus bacteria stay present in hospitals, where they can infect people who are most at risk from infection.

Staphylococcus includes at least 44 species. Of these, nine have two subspecies, one has three subspecies, and one has four subspecies. Many species cannot cause disease and reside normally on the skin and mucous membranes of humans and other animals. Staphylococcus species have been found to be nectar-inhabiting microbes. They are also a small component of the soil microbiome.

== Taxonomy ==
The taxonomy is based on 16s rRNA sequences, and most of the staphylococcal species fall into 11 clusters:

1. S. aureus group – S. argenteus, S. aureus, S. schweitzeri, S. simiae
2. S. auricularis group – S. auricularis
3. S. carnosus group – S. carnosus, S. condimenti, S. debuckii, S. massiliensis, S. piscifermentans, S. simulans
4. S. epidermidis group – S. capitis, S. caprae, S. epidermidis, S. saccharolyticus
5. S. haemolyticus group – S. borealis, S. devriesei, S. haemolyticus, S. hominis
6. S. hyicus-intermedius group – S. agnetis, S. chromogenes, S. cornubiensis, S. felis, S. delphini, S. hyicus, S. intermedius, S. lutrae, S. microti, S. muscae, S. pseudintermedius, S. rostri, S. schleiferi
7. S. lugdunensis group – S. lugdunensis
8. S. saprophyticus group – S. arlettae, S. caeli, S. cohnii, S. equorum, S. gallinarum, S. kloosii, S. nepalensis, S. saprophyticus, S. succinus, S. xylosus
9. S. sciuri group – S. fleurettii, S. lentus, S. sciuri, S. stepanovicii, S. vitulinus
10. S. simulans group – S. simulans
11. S. warneri group – S. pasteuri, S. warneri

A twelfth group – that of S. caseolyticus – has now been removed to a new genus, Macrococcus, the species of which are currently the closest known relatives of Staphylococcus.

Two species were described in 2015 – Staphylococcus argenteus and Staphylococcus schweitzeri – both of which were previously considered variants of S. aureus.

A new coagulase negative species – Staphylococcus edaphicus – has been isolated from Antarctica. This species is probably a member of the S. saprophyticus group.

=== Groups ===
Based on an analysis of orthologous gene content three groups (A, B and C) have been proposed.

- Group A includes S. aureus, S. borealis, S. capitis, S. epidermidis, S. haemolyticus, S. hominis, S. lugdunensis, S. pettenkoferi, S. simiae and S. warneri.
- Group B includes S. arlettae, S. cohnii, S. equorum, S. saprophyticus and S. xylosus.
- Group C includes S. delphini, S. intermedius and S. pseudintermedius.

=== Notes ===
The S. saprophyticus and S. sciuri groups are generally novobiocin-resistant, as is S. hominis subsp. novobiosepticus.

Members of the S. sciuri group are oxidase-positive due to their possession of the enzyme cytochrome c oxidase. This group is the only clade within the staphylococci to possess this gene.

The S. sciuri group appears to be the closest relations to the genus Macrococcus.

S. pulvereri has been shown to be a junior synonym of S. vitulinus.

Within these clades, the S. haemolyticus and S. simulans groups appear to be related, as do the S. aureus and S. epidermidis groups.

S. lugdunensis appears to be related to the S. haemolyticus group.

S. petrasii may be related to S. haemolyticus, but this needs to be confirmed.

The taxonomic position of S. lyticans,S. petrasii, and S. pseudolugdunensis has yet to be clarified. The published descriptions of these species do not appear to have been validly published.

== Biochemical identification ==
Assignment of a strain to the genus Staphylococcus requires it to be a Gram-positive coccus that forms clusters, has an appropriate cell wall structure (including peptidoglycan type and teichoic acid presence) and G + C content of DNA in a range of 30–40 mol%.

Staphylococcus species can be differentiated from other aerobic and facultative anaerobic, Gram-positive cocci by several simple tests. Staphylococcus species are facultative anaerobes (capable of growth both aerobically and anaerobically). All species grow in the presence of bile salts.

All strains of Staphylococcus aureus were once thought to be coagulase-positive, but this has since been disproven.

Growth can also occur in a 6.5% NaCl solution. On Baird-Parker medium, Staphylococcus species grow fermentatively, except for S. saprophyticus, which grows oxidatively. Staphylococcus species are resistant to bacitracin (0.04 U disc: resistance = < 10 mm zone of inhibition) and susceptible to furazolidone (100 μg disc: resistance = < 15 mm zone of inhibition). Further biochemical testing is needed to identify to the species level.

== Coagulase production ==
One of the most important phenotypical features used in the classification of staphylococci is their ability to produce coagulase, an enzyme that causes blood clot formation.

Seven species are currently recognised as being coagulase-positive: S. aureus, S. delphini, S. hyicus, S. intermedius, S. lutrae, S. pseudintermedius, and S. schleiferi subsp. coagulans. These species belong to two separate groups – the S. aureus (S. aureus alone) group and the S. hyicus-intermedius group (the remaining five).

S. aureus is coagulase-positive, meaning it produces coagulase. However, while the majority of S. aureus strains are coagulase-positive, some may be atypical in that they do not produce coagulase. S. aureus is catalase-positive (meaning that it can produce the enzyme catalase) and able to convert hydrogen peroxide (H_{2}O_{2}) to water and oxygen, which makes the catalase test useful to distinguish staphylococci from enterococci and streptococci.

S. pseudintermedius inhabits and sometimes infects the skin of domestic dogs and cats. This organism, too, can carry the genetic material that imparts multiple bacterial resistance. It is rarely implicated in infections in humans, as a zoonosis.

S. epidermidis, a coagulase-negative species, is a commensal of the skin, but can cause severe infections in immunosuppressed patients and those with central venous catheters. S. saprophyticus, another coagulase-negative species that is part of the normal vaginal flora, is predominantly implicated in genitourinary tract infections in sexually active young women. In recent years, several other Staphylococcus species have been implicated in human infections, notably S. lugdunensis, S. schleiferi, and S. caprae.

Common abbreviations for coagulase-negative staphylococci are CoNS, CNS, or CNST. The American Society for Microbiology abbreviates coagulase-negative staphylococci as "CoNS".

== Genomics and molecular biology ==
The first S. aureus genomes to be sequenced were those of N315 and Mu50, in 2001. Many more complete S. aureus genomes have been submitted to the public databases, making it one of the most extensively sequenced bacteria. The use of genomic data is now widespread and provides a valuable resource for researchers working with S. aureus. Whole genome technologies, such as sequencing projects and microarrays, have shown an enormous variety of S. aureus strains. Each contains different combinations of surface proteins and different toxins. Relating this information to pathogenic behaviour is one of the major areas of staphylococcal research. The development of molecular typing methods has enabled the tracking of different strains of S. aureus. This may lead to better control of outbreak strains. A greater understanding of how the staphylococci evolve, especially due to the acquisition of mobile genetic elements encoding resistance and virulence genes is helping to identify new outbreak strains and may even prevent their emergence.

The widespread incidence of antibiotic resistance across various strains of S. aureus, or across different species of Staphylococcus has been attributed to horizontal gene transfer of genes encoding antibiotic/metal resistance and virulence. A recent study demonstrated the extent of horizontal gene transfer among Staphylococcus to be much greater than previously expected, and encompasses genes with functions beyond antibiotic resistance and virulence, and beyond genes residing within the mobile genetic elements.

Various strains of Staphylococcus are available from biological research centres, such as the National Collection of Type Cultures.

== Host range ==
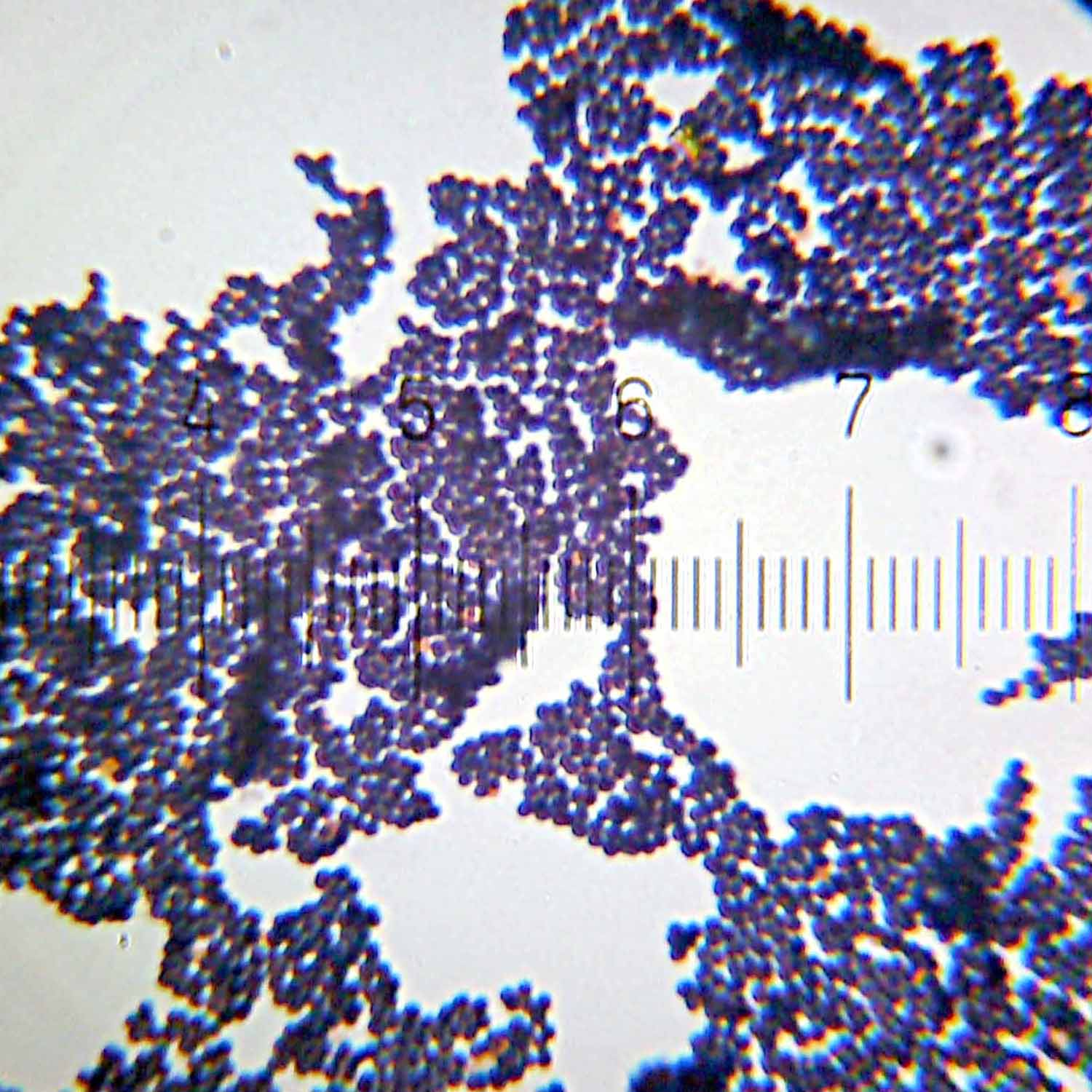
Unknown variety of Staphylococcus, Gram-stained – numbered ticks on the scale are 11 μm apart

Members of the genus Staphylococcus frequently colonize the skin and upper respiratory tracts of mammals and birds and also in marine sponge. Marine sponge associated Staphylococcus species are highly salt tolerant. Some species specificity has been observed in host range, such that the Staphylococcus species observed on some animals appear more rarely on more distantly related host species. Some of the observed host specificity includes:

- S. arlattae – chickens, goats, marine sponge
- S. aureus – humans, cattle
- S. auricularis – deer, dogs, humans
- S. borealis – humans, cattle
- S. capitis – humans
- S. caprae – goats, humans
- S. cohnii – chickens, humans
- S. delphini – dolphins
- S. devriesei – cattle
- S. epidermidis – humans, marine sponge
- S. equorum – horses
- S. felis – cats
- S. fleurettii – goats
- S. gallinarum – chickens, goats, pheasants
- S. haemolyticus – humans, Cercocebus, Erythrocebus, Lemur, Macca, Microcebus, Pan
- S. hyicus – pigs
- S. lentus – goats, rabbits, sheep
- S. lugdunensis – humans, goats
- S. lutrae – otters
- S. microti – voles (Microtus arvalis)
- S. nepalensis – goats
- S. pasteuri – humans, goats
- S. pettenkoferi – humans
- S. pseudintermedius – dogs
- S. rostri – pigs
- S. schleiferi – humans
- S. sciuri – humans, dogs, goats
- S. simiae – South American squirrel monkeys (Saimiri sciureus)
- S. simulans – humans
- S. warneri – humans, Cercopithecoidea, Pongidae
- S. xylosus – humans

=== Populations at risk for Staphylococcus aureus infection ===
Certain groups of people are at greater risk, including people with chronic conditions such as diabetes, cancer, vascular disease, eczema, lung disease, and people who inject drugs. In healthcare facilities, the risk of more serious staph infection is higher for patients with weakened immune systems, patients in intensive care units (ICUs), patients who have undergone certain types of surgeries and patients with medical devices inserted in their bodies.

Staphylococcus aureus has emerged as a leading agent of sepsis. It facilitates factors such as tissue adhesion, immune evasion, and host cell injury. In the bloodstream, these factors cause inflammation, impair immune cell function, alter coagulation, and compromise vascular integrity. When left untreated, S. aureus triggers pathophysiologic disturbances that are further amplified by the host inflammatory response, culminating in the severe clinical manifestations of sepsis and septic shock.

== Clinical ==
Staphylococcus can cause a wide variety of diseases in humans and animals through either toxin production or penetration. Staphylococcal toxins are a common cause of food poisoning, for they can be produced by bacteria growing in improperly stored food items. The most common sialadenitis is caused by staphylococci, as bacterial infections. Staphylococci break down leucine into isovaleric acid, the main odor of foot odor.

== See also ==
- Methicillin-resistant S. aureus (MRSA)
- Vancomycin-resistant S. aureus (VRSA)
