= Staphylococcus carnosus =

Scientific classification
- Domain: Bacteria
- Kingdom: Bacillati
- Phylum: Bacillota
- Class: Bacilli
- Order: Bacillales
- Family: Staphylococcaceae
- Genus: Staphylococcus
- Species: S. carnosus

Binomial name
- Staphylococcus carnosus Schleifer and Fischer 1982

Species of bacterium

Staphylococcus carnosus is a bacterium from the genus Staphylococcus that is both Gram-positive and coagulase-negative. It was originally identified in dry sausage and is an important starter culture for meat fermentation. Unlike other members of its genus, such as Staphylococcus aureus and Staphylococcus epidermidis, S. carnosus is nonpathogenic and safely used in the food industry.

== Taxonomy ==
Staphylococcus carnosus is classified under the domain Bacteria, phylum Bacillota, class Bacilli, order Bacillales, family Staphylococcaceae, genus Staphylococcus, and species S. carnosus. The Staphylococcus genus currently comprises over 60 species and subspecies, including S. carnosus.

== Phylogeny ==
PCR and DNA sequencing along with 16s rRNA sequencing are commonly used to differentiate among the staphylococcal species.

One phylogenetic analysis of Staphylococcus using multiple molecular markers recovered two distinct clades, one containing species that are oxidase positive and one containing species that are oxidase negative. S. carnosus belongs to the clade lacking oxidase activity. The two subspecies of S. carnosus formed a single monophyletic clade, sister to S. condimenti.

Another set of phylogenetic analyses, which used nearly 500 single-copy orthologous genes and which included a different set of species, found that S. carnosus is sister to all included Staphylococcus species except S. pseudintermedius. Both S. pseudintermedius and S. carnosus are not found on humans, thus differentiating them from other staphylococcal species like S. aureus and S. epidermidis, and phylogeny implies that it was only after the split from S. carnosus that adaptation to humans evolved among the staphylococci. Other characteristics that distinguish S. carnosus from the other staphylococcal species include its ability to thrive in a high salt environment, reduce nitrate, and make acetoin. Its inability to make acid from sucrose and maltose also serves as an identifying characteristic.

== Discovery ==
S. carnosus was first isolated from dry sausage in 1982 by Schleifer and Fischer. The discovery process included isolation of the research samples, cultivation, microscopic examination, and various biochemical tests. Initially, S. simulans strains were identified in dry sausage samples by plating them on a selective medium for Staphylococcus, as designed by Schleifer and Krämer, or alternatively on plate-count agar. The medium specific to staphylococci ensured that only members of the genus Staphylococcus would grow while the growth of undesired groups would be inhibited. The plate-count agar technique is used to estimate the total number of bacteria in a given sample. Most of the samples used in both methods were cultivated aerobically in peptone-yeast extract-glucose-NaCl broth. Several tests were performed to determine carbohydrate and physiological reactions, peptidoglycan type, the chemical makeup of the teichoic acids in the cell wall, and cytochrome pattern. All the strains were found to be facultative anaerobes and used glucose to produce equivalent amounts of D- and L-lactate. Finally, DNA-DNA hybridization studies found that S. carnosus has the highest GC content among all Staphylococcus species. In comparative studies, it was observed that DNA homology values between S. carnosus and S. simulans were notably high when contrasted with the homology values between S. carnosus and other species within the Staphylococcus genus. Although the strains of S. simulans and S. carnosus share a close genetic relationship based on DNA homology, this similarity was deemed insufficient to categorize them as a single species.

== Morphology ==
S. carnosus typically appears as single or paired spherical cells, known as cocci, with diameters ranging from 0.5 to 1.5 μm. These cells form colonies with a round configuration, smooth margins, and a slightly raised elevation. Colonies of S. carnosus often exhibit a grayish-white coloration and a subtle shiny texture, making them easily distinguishable on agar plates. The diameter of these colonies typically falls within the range of 1 to 3 mm. Gram staining of S. carnosus cells reveals that they are Gram-positive due to the thickness of their peptidoglycan layer. Lastly, S. carnosus is non-motile and non-spore forming, indicating the absence of a flagellum for movement and its inability to form endospores for survival during adverse conditions. Instead, its growth and survival depends on its metabolic capabilities and adaptations to the environment.

== Metabolism ==
S. carnosus is a facultative anaerobic chemoorganotroph that utilizes respiratory metabolism. In conditions where oxygen is absent, it can use nitrate as a terminal electron acceptor in anaerobic respiration. When nitrate is reduced, the resulting nitrite first accumulates in the medium. Once the nitrate has been depleted, the nitrite is absorbed by the cells and undergoes further reduction to ammonia, which is then incorporated into biomass. The synthesis of both nitrite reductase and nitrate reductase is inhibited by oxygen, which is consistent with the status of S. carnosus as a facultative anaerobe that carries out aerobic respiration for energy in the presence of oxygen and switches to anaerobic nitrate respiration when oxygen is not available.

When grown aerobically, strains of S. carnosus produced acid on some sugars such as glucose and fructose but did not produce acid on other sugars such as sucrose and lactose. Compared to other staphylococci species, such as S. xylosus and S. equorum, S. carnosus has a greater tendency to degrade certain amino acids into methyl-branched aldehydes, their respective esters, and acids, and also produce more methyl ketone products through fatty acid β-oxidation. All of these compounds contribute to aroma and affect the degree of maturity of fermented sausage.

S. carnosus tested positive for catalase, an enzyme responsible for decomposing hydrogen peroxide into water and oxygen. It also tested positive for benzidine, which confirms that it has a cytochrome system used during aerobic respiration.

== Physiology ==
S. carnosus is a mesophile because it displays a growth optimum at relatively high temperatures (32-37 °C). S. carnosus has a high tolerance for salt and can persist in NaCl concentrations of up to 15%, although growth begins to slow at 10% NaCl. Due to its role in meat fermentation, S. carnosus can live in acidic conditions and adapt to a pH of 5.5. However, its growth can be limited in the presence of more pH-tolerant microorganisms. It has also been shown that S. carnosus, specifically strain TM300, is capable of altering the composition of its peptidoglycan in response to different incubation conditions. When grown in the presence of high sugar levels, S. carnosus experienced overflow metabolism that led to the appearance of tetra stem peptides in its peptidoglycan. S. carnosus also upregulates the production of catalase and superoxide dismutase, both of which provide important antioxidant functions, when incubated in a sausage fermentation environment (i.e., acidic conditions, available nitrite and nitrate, and minimal aeration).

== Genomics ==
The genome of S. carnosus TM300 has been sequenced and analyzed. Out of all the sequenced staphylococcal genomes, S. carnosus is distinguished from other species because it contains the highest GC content at 34.6%. Its genome size is one of the smallest among those in the Staphylococcus genus (2.56 Mbp) and has a high coding density (86.0%). The genome contains the genes required for a starter culture, including a nitrate- and nitrite-reduction pathway, appropriate metabolic pathways, and enzymes that mitigate oxidative stress. Many of the open reading frames in the S. carnosus genome are truncated, reflecting the loss of gene functions as a result of living in a nutrient-rich environment. The non-pathogenicity of S. carnosus is supported by the low number of mobile elements in its genome as well as a lack of toxins and superantigens found in pathogenic species like S. aureus and S. epidermidis. Although S. carnosus is avirulent, its genome encodes for several homologs of virulence factors found in other staphylococci. These proteins, however, do not have a pathogenic effect in S. carnosus and may contribute to other important functions such as host colonization.

Genomic sequencing and annotation of a different S. carnosus strain (LTH 7013) taken from South Tyrolean ham revealed that this strain could also catalyze the reduction of nitrate to nitrite and nitrite to ammonia, and no toxins nor superantigens were identified. The genome of S. carnosus LTH 3730, which was obtained from a sample of fermented fish, has also been sequenced. In addition to a nitrate-nitrite reduction system, LTH 3730 also contained genes encoding catalase, peroxidases, and proteins involved in oxidative stress response. However, unlike other strains of S. carnosus such as TM300, LTH 3730 demonstrated hemolytic activity. This hemolytic activity, coupled with the presence of proteins identified in pathogenic strains of staphylococci, has prevented the use of LTH 3730 as a starter culture.

== Ecology ==
Although it was originally isolated from sausage, the natural habitat of S. carnosus remains contested. While many species of Staphylococcus have been found in humans, S. carnosus has never been collected from human sources. It has been speculated that S. carnosus may live on the skin of animals because of its common presence in meat. Others have proposed that S. carnosus could be derived from fish based on its phylogenetic proximity to S. piscifermentans and the similarities in their 16S rRNA and CydA and CydB proteins.

A study investigated the surface characteristics of different S. carnosus strains and found that they could adhere to surfaces commonly found in food processing factories such as stainless steel but could not accumulate, likely due to their inability to synthesize the polysaccharides that are important for adhesion. This finding provides an explanation for why S. carnosus is not usually isolated from the environment, such as in the food industry and the clinical setting, and why its true ecological niche is still uncertain.

== Applications ==
S. carnosus is one of the main species of Staphylococcus used in food fermentation. The practice of using S. carnosus as a meat starter culture originated in the 1950s because of its nitrate- and nitrite-reducing ability, contributing to the desired coloring and flavoring of the meat while reducing odors. Additionally, S. carnosus has an important role in preventing the growth of undesirable bacteria and hence guards against food spoilage. The beneficial properties of S. carnosus make it particularly useful to the food industry, such as preserving fresh meat products.

Other potential applications of S. carnosus outside of food fermentation are also being explored. Gram-positive bacteria like S. carnosus can be engineered to express metal-binding peptides that allow it to absorb metal ions, which can be applied to bioremediation of wastewater contaminated with toxic metals. Additionally, its extensive use in meat preparation and status as a GRAS (generally regarded as safe) organism makes S. carnosus a possible candidate for delivering live vaccines as it poses very little danger to the host. Thus, the unique characteristics of S. carnosus reveal avenues for its further development in medical advancements and environmental impact.
