= Staphylococcus nepalensis =

Scientific classification
- Domain: Bacteria
- Kingdom: Bacillati
- Phylum: Bacillota
- Class: Bacilli
- Order: Bacillales
- Family: Staphylococcaceae
- Genus: Staphylococcus
- Species: S. nepalensis

Binomial name
- Staphylococcus nepalensis Spergser et al. 2003

Species of bacterium

Staphylococcus nepalensis is a Gram-positive coccoid bacterium belonging to the genus Staphylococcus.

== History ==
This species was first isolated from the respiratory tract of goats in 2003.

== Description ==
The bacteria are nonmotile, oxidase-negative, catalase-positive, Gram-positive cocci, 1.1 to 1.6 μm in diameter, that occur singly, in pairs, and in irregular clusters. The G+C content of the type strain is 33 mol%.

Colonies after 2 days on P agar are circular, low-convex, smooth, glossy, opaque white, and 2–6 mm in diameter. Growth occurs aerobically and anaerobically in the presence of 0.0 to 7.5% NaCl. The type strain grows well in the presence of 10% NaCl, but growth is variable for other strains. No growth is observed in the presence of 15% NaCl. Growth occurs between 20 and 40 °C: best growth occurs at 30 °C. No growth is observed at 15 or 45 °C.

This bacterium produces urease, alkaline phosphatase, pyrrolidonyl arylamidase, beta-galactosidase, and beta-glucuronidase, and hydrolyses aesculin and Tween 80. It reduces nitrate to nitrite. It is negative for clumping factor, coagulase, hyaluronidase, arginine dihydrolase, ornithine decarboxylase, acetoin, arginine arylamidase, alpha- and beta-haemolysins, heat-stable and heat-labile nucleases, indole, hydrogen sulphide, and lecithinase. It produces acid aerobically from D-glucose, D-fructose, D-mannose, maltose, lactose, trehalose, mannitol, sucrose, L-arabinose, N-acetylglucosamine, galactose, glycerol, erythritol, D-xylose, arbutin, and salicin.

Acid is not formed aerobically from D-raffinose, ribose, D-cellobiose, D-arabinose, L-xylose, adonitol, methyl-D-xyloside, rhamnose, L-sorbose, dulcitol, starch, inositol, methyl-D-mannoside, methyl-D-glucoside, amygdalin, melibiose, melezitose, gentiobiose, glycogen, inulin, D-tagatose, D-lyxose, cellobiose, D-fucose, L-fucose, L-arabitol, gluconate, 2-ketogluconate or 5-ketogluconate.

Acid production from D-arabitol, sorbitol, turanose and xylitol is variable; the type strain is positive. It is resistant to novobiocin, bacitracin, vibriostatic agent O/129, lysozyme, metronidazole, and optochin. It is susceptible to lysostaphin, furazolidone, ampicillin, amoxicillin, amoxicillin/clavulanic acid, ceftiofur, cephalexin, cephalothin, chloramphenicol, clindamycin, colistin sulphate, enrofloxacin, erythromycin, florfenicol, fosfomycin, fusidic acid, gentamicin, kanamycin, lincomycin, neomycin, nitrofurantoin, oxacillin, penicillin G, polymyxin B, sulfamethoxazole/trimethoprim, tetracycline, and vancomycin.

The quinone system consists of the major menaquinone MK-7 and minor amounts of MK-6 and MK-8. Predominant fatty acids are ai-C15:0, i-C15:0, and ai-C17:0, whilst i-C17:0, C18:0, C16:0, C20:0, and i-C19:0 are present in moderate amounts. Polar lipid profile consists of the major lipids diphosphatidylglycerol, phosphatidylglycerol, and an unknown glycolipid.

This species has been isolated from dry-cured ham and from human urine, but its pathological significance is not yet clear.
