= Staphylococcus caprae =

Scientific classification
- Domain: Bacteria
- Kingdom: Bacillati
- Phylum: Bacillota
- Class: Bacilli
- Order: Bacillales
- Family: Staphylococcaceae
- Genus: Staphylococcus
- Species: S. caprae

Binomial name
- Staphylococcus caprae Devriese et al. 1983

Species of bacterium

Staphylococcus caprae is a Gram-positive, coccus bacteria and a member of the genus Staphylococcus. S. caprae is coagulase-negative. It was originally isolated from goats (caprae means "of a goat"), but members of this species have also been isolated from human samples.

== Clinical importance ==
Staphylococcus caprae occurs as a commensal on human skin, but has also been implicated in infections of the bloodstream, urinary tract, bones, and joints. Because S. caprae is difficult to identify definitively in the laboratory, according to a study in 2014, the incidence of S. caprae in humans is under-reported.

== Literature and further reading ==
It is a coagulase-negative, DNase-positive member of the genus Staphylococcus. Usually it is associated with goats. Since 1991, a few laboratories reported that they had isolated the organism from human clinical specimens. It is now an emerging microorganism in joint and bone infections in humans.

Staphylococcus caprae was first described in 1983 by Devisee et al. based on a strain isolated from goat milk. It can sometimes cause mastitis in the goats, and it is considered a commensal organism for the goats’ skin and mammary glands. It has been reported as a pathogen for humans acquired at hospitals, mostly in bone and joint infections. There have also been studies on S. caprae causing sepsis in clinical settings.
