= Staphylococcus muscae =

Scientific classification
- Domain: Bacteria
- Kingdom: Bacillati
- Phylum: Bacillota
- Class: Bacilli
- Order: Bacillales
- Family: Staphylococcaceae
- Genus: Staphylococcus
- Species: S. muscae

Binomial name
- Staphylococcus muscae Hájek et al. 1992

Species of bacterium

Staphylococcus muscae is a Gram-positive coccoid bacterium belonging to the genus Staphylococcus.

== History ==
This species was first isolated from flies (Musca domestica and Stomoxys calcitrans) caught in a cow shed in 1992.

== Description ==
This species consists of small Gram-positive cocci that range from 0.4 to 1.1 pm in diameter and are arranged predominantly in irregular clumps, occasionally in pairs and singly. The spherical or slightly ovoid cells are nonmotile and nonsporeforming.

The G+C content of the genome is 40-41%.

Colonies on P agar (after five days at 37 °C) are only slightly convex with gently raised centers, circular, entire, smooth, faintly glistening, butyrous, opaque, grayish white, and 5–6 mm in diameter.

The species grows well in the presence of NaCl at concentrations up to 10%; no growth occurs at an NaCl concentration of 15%. They grow moderately at 25 °C; no growth occurs at 10 and 45 °C.

They are facultative anaerobes. Better growth occurs under aerobic conditions. Anaerobic growth in a semisolid thioglycolate medium is evident after 24 to 48 hours.

This species produces catalase, phosphatase and heat-labile nuclease. It is positive in the benzidine test and weakly positive in methyl red test. It exhibits clear hemolysis on ovine blood agar medium. It produces lecithinase, splits Tween 20, Tween 40, and Tween 80 and reduces nitrate. On crystal violet agar it may produce white (positive, E type) colonies or blue (negative, D type) colonies.

It does not produce oxidase, coagulase, clumping factor, fibrinolysin, thermostable nuclease, tellurite reductase, gelatinase, protease, urease, arginine dihydrolase, alpha- or beta-haemeolysins, ornithine decarboxylase, acetylmethylcarbinol, or beta-galactosidase. It does not hydrolyze starch or esculin.

The species produces acid aerobically from glucose (without gas), fructose, sucrose, trehalose, turanose, xylose, and glycerol. No acid is produced from adonitol, arabinose, arbutin, cellobiose, dulcitol, fucose, galactose, inositol, inulin, lactose, maltose, mannitol, mannose, melezitose, melibiose, raffinose, rhamnose, ribose, salicin, sorbose, or tagatose. It normally weakly produces acid anaerobically from glucose.

It is resistant to lysozyme (minimum inhibitory concentration (MIC) >1,000 kg/ml) and susceptible to novobiocin (MIC, 0.06 to 0.1 pg/ml), penicillin (MIC, 0.01 to 0.06 pg/ml), oxacillin (MIC,0.2 pg/ml), ampicillin (MIC, 0.06 to 1.0 pg/ml), cephaloridine(MIC, 0.1 to 0.2 pg/ml), erythromycin (MIC, 0.06 pg/ml), lincomycin (MIC, 0.2 to 0.5 pg/ml), clindamycin (MIC, 0.1 pg/ml), chloramphenicol (MIC, 2.0 pg/ml), tetracycline (MIC, 0.1 to 0.2 pg/ml), gentamicin (MIC, 0.2 pg/ml) and vancomycin (MIC, 1.0 pg/ml). It is resistant to bacitracin (10 U per disc) and susceptible to furadantin (100 pg per disc).

The cell walls contain a glycine-rich peptidoglycan.

== Epidemiology ==
This species has been isolated from Musca domestica and Stomoxys calcitrans. It is probably a commensal of cattle.

== Clinical ==
This species is not known to be associated with disease.
