= Staphylococcus schleiferi =

Scientific classification
- Domain: Bacteria
- Kingdom: Bacillati
- Phylum: Bacillota
- Class: Bacilli
- Order: Bacillales
- Family: Staphylococcaceae
- Genus: Staphylococcus
- Species: S. schleiferi

Binomial name
- Staphylococcus schleiferi Freney et al. 1988

Subspecies
- Staphylococcus schleiferi subsp. schleiferi; Staphylococcus schleiferi subsp. coagulans Igimi et al. 1990

Species of bacterium

Staphylococcus schleiferi is a Gram-positive, cocci-shaped bacterium of the family Staphylococcaceae. It is facultatively anaerobic, coagulase-variable, and can be readily cultured on blood agar where the bacterium tends to form opaque, non-pigmented colonies and beta (β) hemolysis. There exists two subspecies under the species S. schleiferi: Staphylococcus schleiferi subsp. schleiferi (coagulase negative) and Staphylococcus schleiferi subsp. coagulans (coagulase positive).

Staphylococcus schleiferi is commonly recognized as a veterinary pathogen affecting household pets, but has not been identified as a disease causing organism in large animals. S. schleiferi has been identified as a causative agent of conditions of Pyoderma, Otitis Externa, and Otitis media in both dogs and cats; although more commonly causing inflammatory conditions in dogs than in cats. Human infections have been described in some case reports, resulting in certain disease conditions including: surgical site infections, pediatric meningitis, endocarditis, and intravascular device-related bacteremia. Although both companion animals and humans can acquire disease from this organism, its zoonotic potential is not well understood. Antimicrobial therapy has been generally successful in treatment of infections, however, resistance to beta-lactam antibiotics have been reported, resulting in persistent infections for both humans and veterinary species.

Since its first description in 1988, little has been reported regarding the pathogenicity and virulence of Staphylococcus schleiferi. However, similarities with infections caused by Staphylococcus aureus suggest that the two species may also share similar determinants of virulence. Virulence factors associated with S. schleiferi have been identified to include the production of fatty acid modifying enzyme (FAME), biofilms, penicillin-binding protein 2a (PBP2a), as well as various enterotoxins and exoenzymes.

Staphylococcus schleiferi is differentiated from other Staphylococcal species based on their coagulation reaction, but because there is a coagulase positive and a coagulase negative subspecies of S. schleiferi, additional biochemical tests are required. These tests are often not done clinically as treatment is based on susceptibility testing and location of the infection.

== Microbiology ==
=== History and taxonomy ===
In 1988, Freney et al. isolated two previously unidentified Staphylococcus species from human clinical specimens: S. schleiferi and S. lugdunensis. The former species was named schleiferi in honor of German microbiologist Karl Heinz Schleifer, to mark his significant contributions to the taxonomy of gram-positive bacteria. Later in 1990, a coagulase-positive subtype was isolated from dogs and cats by Igimi et al. This led to the classification of Staphylococcus schleiferi into two distinct subspecies, the coagulase-negative S. schleiferi schleiferi and the coagulase-positive S. schleiferi coagulans. Both S. schleiferi subspecies have since been reported to be linked to an array of infections in humans and companion animals.

=== Cellular morphology ===
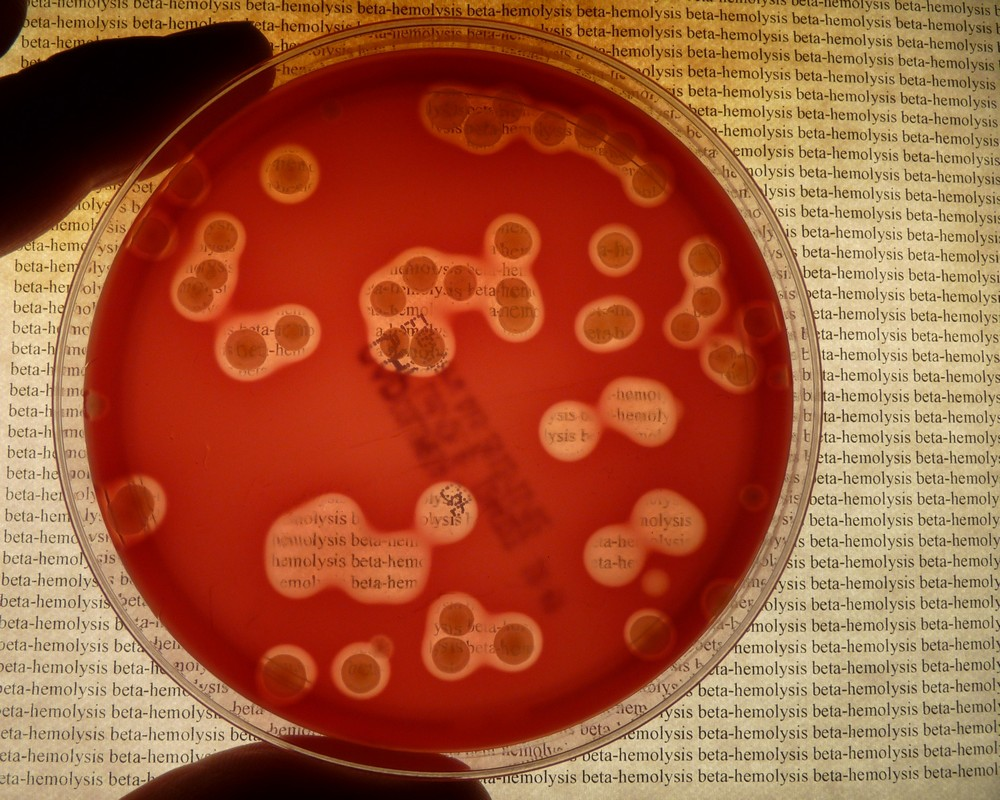
Complete (β) hemolysis on blood agar.

Staphylococcus schleiferi is a facultatively anaerobic, coagulase-variable, Gram-positive cocci organism. It is nonmotile and nonspore-forming. When cultured on 5% sheep blood agar, isolates of S. schleiferi form circular, opaque, non-pigmented colonies of approximately 0.8 to 1.0μm in diameter. A complete (β) hemolysis can be seen on blood agar as well. On a Gram stain, S. schleiferi appears as individuals, pairs, small clusters, or chains of 3 to 7 cells.

=== Biochemistry and identification ===
Staphylococcus schleiferi can be readily identified using matrix-assisted laser desorption ionization time of flight (MALDI-TOF), although differentiation to the subspecies level often requires biochemical testing with tube coagulase and urease reactions. S. schleiferi subspecies schleiferi tests negative for tube coagulase and urease, whereas S. schleiferi subspecies coagulans tests positive for tube coagulase and urease. Commercial identification systems often recommend the use of additional biochemical tests to further confirm an identification of S. schleiferi.

==== Differentiation from Staphylococcus aureus ====
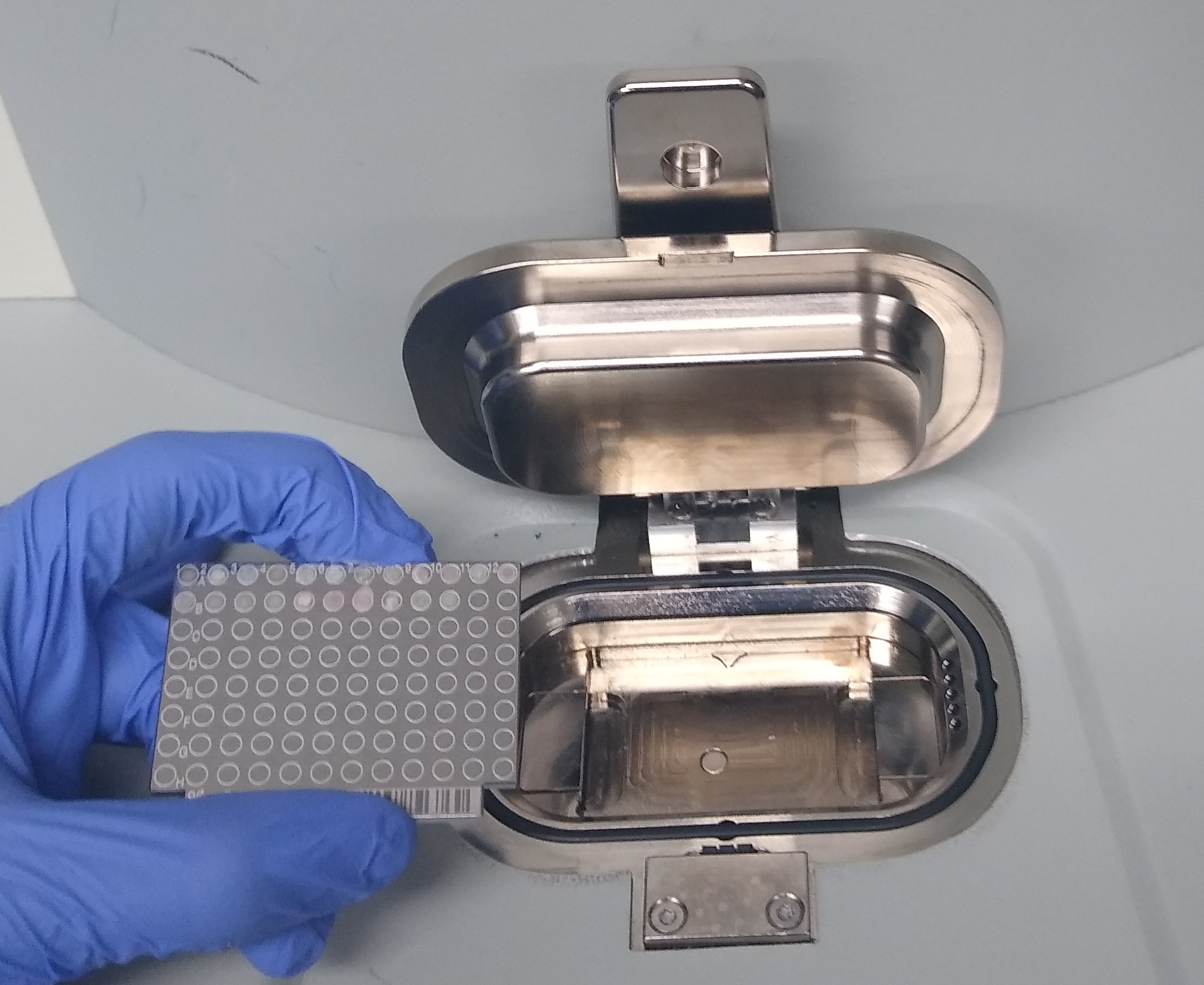
MALDI-TOF can effectively identify S. schleiferi, although biochemical tests are needed to differentiate the species to the subspecies level.

Staphylococcus schleiferi can often be mistaken for Staphylococcus aureus as both staphylococcal species produce heat-stable DNase and clumping factor. Moreover, colonies of S. aureus appear morphologically similar when grown on blood agar. Many have even suggested that there is an underestimation of reported S. schleiferi infections due to false identifications of S. schleiferi as S. aureus. Multiple biochemical tests can be performed to differentiate these related Staphylococcus species, although some analyses, such as the tube coagulase test, are not performed in routine laboratory procedures. Sugar fermentation tests, for instance, can be performed as S. schleiferi does not acidify maltose, mannitol, or sucrose, as opposed to S. aureus. S. schleiferi also demonstrates pyrrolidonyl arlamidase (PYR) activity, whereas S. aureus tests negative for PYR enzymatic activity. S. schleiferi can also be discerned from S. aureus by production of a different thermonuclease that lacks pigmentation. In contrast to S. schleiferi which produces β-hemolysin and consequently exhibits a complete (β) hemolysis, strains of S. aureus can produce double-zone (α + β) hemolysis.

==== Differentiation from Staphylococcus lugdunensis ====
Although Staphylococcus schleiferi and Staphylococcus lugdunensis both demonstrate PYR activity and production of clumping factor, these staphylococcal species can be differentiated in their different hemolytic activities on blood agar. While S. schleiferi presents a complete (β) hemolysis, S. lugdunensis produces a double-zone (α + β) hemolysis. S. schleiferi is also capable of adherence to glass, while S. lugdunensis fails to adhere to glass.

== Epidemiology ==
=== Prevalence ===
Staphylococcus schleiferi is recognized as commensal microflora on the skin of humans and animals like many other Staphylococci species. It is more commonly recognized as a veterinary pathogen affecting household pets; in particular, S. schleiferi has been isolated from healthy dogs as well as dogs with skin and ear infections.

Staphylococcus schleiferi is less commonly associated with human infection, but can be nosocomial acquired. A study performed at a tertiary care centre in Northern Spain found that out of 28 patients documented with S. schleiferi infection, 89.3% were men. Over half of the patients that were infected also had some degree of immunosuppression, namely malignant neoplasm. Most infections were also related to wound-infection (mainly surgical-site infections) - however, infection-related mortality was low.

==== Geographical distribution ====
Staphylococcus schleiferi has a worldwide distribution. This opportunistic pathogen has been isolated from dogs with pyoderma and otitis externa in Korea, Japan, France, Italy, and the West Indies. . S. schleiferi was the second most prevalent species present in samples collected from dogs with pyoderma and otitis externa in Korea. It has also been isolated from 36 patients in northern Spain from 1993-1999.

Staphylococcus schleiferi was isolated from a multitude of pinniped species and penguins in the Antarctic and Scotland.

=== Antimicrobial resistance ===
==== Methicillin-resistance ====
Methicillin-resistant staphylococci is a growing public health concern, with systemic use of antibiotics becoming more common. Systemic antibiotic use has been associated with the development of infections with MR staphylococci. Increased prevalence of methicillin-resistant staphylococci has been reported in specialty dermatology practices in the United States and in Canada. A study performed at University of Pennsylvania School of Veterinary Medicine found that 40% of S. schleiferi were resistant to methicillin. At the University of Tennessee, 46.6% of the S. schleiferi isolated were resistant to oxacillin. Seven strains of methicillin-resistant S. schleiferi (MRSS) were also isolated from dogs presenting with pyoderma and otitis externa in Korea.

Compared to other MR staphylococci, MRSS maintained the most favourable susceptibility profile. However, to avoid selecting for resistant strains, culture and susceptibility testing is crucial prior to starting a course of treatment.

==== Fluoroquinolone resistance ====
Eight isolates of S. schleiferi from canine patients were tested against 23 antimicrobial agents. 62.5% showed resistance to multiple fluoroquinolones. A similar study found only 40% of S. schleiferi isolates to be susceptible to all 16 fluoroquinolones tested against it.

Although the current antimicrobials commonly used for treatment of S. schleiferi caused infections experimentally show susceptibility, the changes in temporal trends and different resistance patterns for S. schleiferi emphasize the importance of antimicrobial susceptibility testing to choose the most appropriate treatment of infections.

== Zoonotic potential ==
Staphylococcus species were initially thought to be host-specific pathogens, however, human strains of S. intermedius, S. schleiferi, and S. aureus have been isolated from animal reservoirs, indicating their multi-host potential. S. schleiferi is a known canine skin pathogen, causing pyoderma, otitis externa, and otitis media in healthy dogs with no pre-existing risk factors; and has also been reported to infect humans, causing a multitude of nosocomial infections such as endocarditis, osteomyelitis, septic arthritis, UTIs, and wound infections. It is unknown what role zoonotic transmission has in human disease acquisition associated with S. schleiferi, however, there is growing evidence of zoonoses occurring with other related Staphylococcus species.

=== Evidence of zoonosis in Staphylococcus species ===
==== Staphylococcus aureus ====
Methicillin-Resistant S. aureus (MRSA) has been a growing public health concern, with increases in infection prevalence in individuals with no apparent risk factors. Both zoonotic and reverse zoonotic transmission have been reported for MRSA, indicating the ability for the bacteria to accumulate on animal reservoirs, and to reinfect humans.

==== Staphylococcus intermedius ====
S. intermedius is a common commensal of dogs and cats, though rarely causes infections in humans. However, infections have been found in people with relation to household pets, resulting in a report of postoperative sinus infection, otitis externa, bite wounds, catheter related injuries, and surgery. Owners of dogs affected by deep pyoderma carried multiple anti-microbial resistant strains of S. intermedius which is thought to be transferred between the canine and human pathogenic staphylococci.

==== Staphylococcus pseudintermedius ====
S. pseudintermedius is considered a novel species of Staphylococcus, and is a commensal organism found on the skin and mucous membranes of dogs. Transmission from canines is suspected to cause skin and soft tissue infections in people. S. pseudintermedius was also isolated from skin breaks of child with eczema following licking from the family dog.

==== Staphylococcus schleiferi ====
Although there is little evidence outlining the incidence of zoonotic transmission, the increasing recognition of Methicillin-Resistant isolates of S. schleiferi may have importance to public health, as there is already concern regarding possible transfer of resistance genes from canine to human staphylococci species.

== Virulence ==
The mechanisms that Staphylococcus schleiferi employ to carry out its virulence are not well elucidated however, similarities between infections of S. schleiferi and other Staphylococcus spp. such as Staphylococcus aureus suggest that these species also share similar determinants of virulence.

=== Fatty acid modifying enzyme (FAME) and lipase ===
The production of fatty acid modifying enzyme (FAME) and lipase has been identified as potential virulence factors in various Staphylococcus species including S. schleiferi. The production of both FAME and lipase assists the organism in circumventing host defenses such as bactericidal lipids, thus allowing its persistence and survival within host tissues. FAME produced by Staphylococcus inhibits bactericidal fatty acids which are a first line of defense against invading organisms during abscess formation. The production of lipase also prevents glycerides from inhibiting the activity of FAME, thus expression of both enzymes is thought to be required for the survival of Staphylococcus within abscesses.

=== Biofilm ===
Many Staphylococcus spp. possess the capacity to produce biofilm: a polysaccharide matrix which contributes to the organism's ability to resist antimicrobial therapeutics, evade the host's immune system, and survive on inanimate surfaces. Methicillin-resistant strains of S. schleiferi have been found to possess this ability to produce biofilm which limits access to the organism by antimicrobial therapeutic agents and is thought to also provide protection against host defense cationic antimicrobial peptides. Additionally, S. schleiferi has been shown to express cell wall-anchored fibronectin-binding proteins which may play a role in its pathogenesis by facilitating adherence to host cells and proteins, as well as to medical devices which can become important sources of nosocomial infection.

=== Antibiotic resistance ===
Antibiotic resistance plays a critical role in the development and persistence of infection and although is not considered to be a virulence factor alone, may act as a virulence-like factor in unique circumstances by facilitating the colonization of opportunistic pathogens such as Staphylococcus schleiferi, allowing them greater opportunity to cause disease such as in nosocomial infections.

Methicillin resistance within the Staphylococcus species is facilitated by the spread of the mecA gene which codes for penicillin-binding protein 2a (PBP2a). The mecA gene is carried by a mobile genetic element called the staphylococcal cassette chromosome mec (SCCmec) which is thought to promote spread between different species. The presence of the mecA gene, expression of PBP2a, and methicillin resistance has been reported in S. schleiferi isolates. Penicillin-binding proteins are critical in the crosslinking reaction required for the synthesis of peptidoglycan and are the targets of beta-lactam antibiotics. However, PBP2a encoded by the mecA gene have reduced affinity for, and thus is not inhibited by, most beta-lactam antibiotics thus conferring resistance against most beta-lactam antibiotics.

Staphylococcus schleiferi has also shown resistance to fluoroquinolones, including second and third generation fluoroquinolones, but may retain susceptibility to fourth generation fluoroquinolones. This resistance was associated with changes in the gyrA gene which encodes for DNA gyrase subunit A, resulting in less susceptibility of the enzyme to fluoroquinolones.

=== Enterotoxins and exoenzymes ===
Many Staphylococcal species produce enterotoxins which have known pyrogenic and emetic effects. PCR analysis has detected the presence of enterotoxin producing genes sed and ELISA methods have shown the production of the corresponding staphylococcal enterotoxin SED by S. schleiferi. SED is thought to be one of the most common enterotoxins produced by Staphylococcus spp. associated with food poisoning. S. schleiferi also produce staphylococcal enterotoxins SEA, SEB, SEC and toxic-shock syndrome toxin (TSST-1). Enterotoxins SEA and SEB are known emetics in primates and, with TSST-1, cause Toxic Shock Syndrome with acute intoxication.

Staphylococcus schleiferi also possess the ability to produce numerous exoenzymes such as alpha and delta toxins, DNase, lipase, esterase, and protease which may also contribute to its virulence or serve as aggressins. A beta-like toxin similar in structure and functionality to the beta-toxin of S. aureus has also been described in S. schleiferi.

== Disease ==
=== Diseases of dogs and cats ===
Staphylococcus schleiferi is most commonly identified as a pathogenic bacteria of companion animals (primarily dogs and cats). Staphylococcus schleiferi rarely causes disease in cats, and it is more commonly associated with inflammatory conditions of dogs. Staphylococcus schleiferi can be involved in conditions of Pyoderma, Otitis Externa, and Otitis media in both dogs and cats.

==== Pyoderma ====
Staphylococcus schleiferi is one of the causative agents in pyoderma of dogs and cats. Pyoderma is a skin infection characterized by the presence of purulent discharge (pus). Dogs are most commonly affected by this skin infection which may be caused by a bacterial infection or sometimes, but less commonly, a fungal infection. Staphylococcus schleiferi along with Staphylococcus aureus and Staphylococcus pseudintermedius are the most common bacteria that cause pyoderma in dogs. Staphylococcus schleiferi is more commonly found in cases of pyoderma with dogs suffering from reoccurring pyoderma who have already undergone antimicrobial treatment. Staphylococcus pseudintermedius and Staphylococcus aureus are more commonly found to be the cause of pyoderma in dogs who are experiencing the infection for the first time. The symptoms of pyoderma include: pruritus (severe itchiness); dermatitis (general skin irritation); alopecia (hair loss); scaling/scabbing; and bloody and/or purulent discharge. When treating a dog with pyoderma related to Staphylococcus schleiferi, it is important to avoid administering methicillin and other penicillins, as there is increasing resistance to these antimicrobial therapies.

==== Otitis externa ====
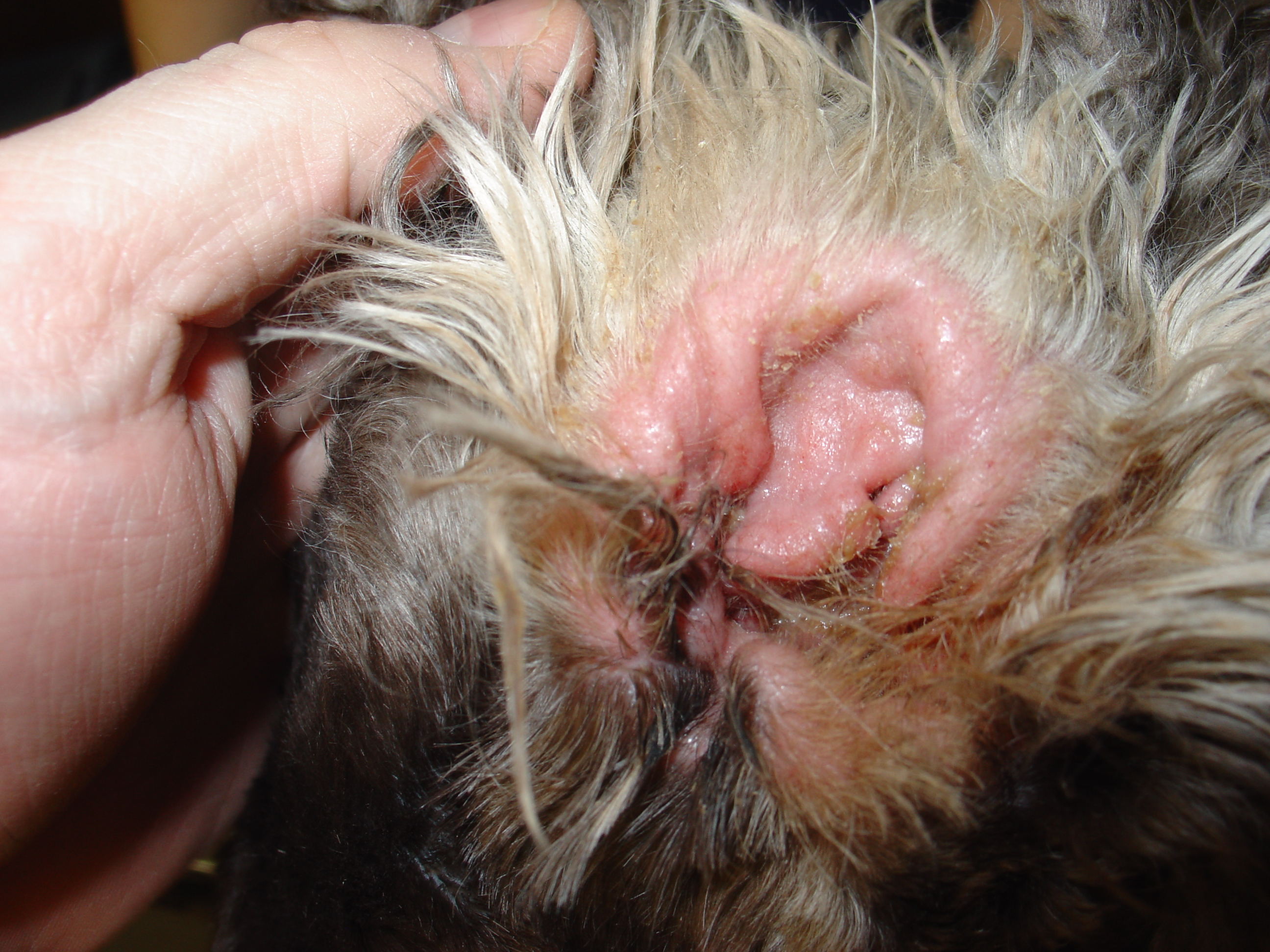
A Cocker Spaniel diagnosed with Otitis Externa.

Otitis Externa is an inflammatory condition of the outer ear canal that affects many species, including canids. Staphylococcus schleiferi has been identified as one of the organisms which contributes to Otitis Externa in dogs and less commonly in cats. Otitis Externa is the most common disorder of the ear canal of dogs. Clinical signs of Otitis Externa include: head shaking, alopecia (hair loss), erythema (reddening of the skin), and pruritus (itchiness). There appears to be a higher incidence of Otitis Externa in young dogs (1–5 years of age) as compared to older dogs (>5 years of age). There is also disposition to Otitis Externa in certain breeds, including: Cocker Spaniels, Golden Retrievers, and West Highland White Terriers. Treatment of Otitis Externa depends on the cause. There are multiple organisms that may cause this inflammation and infection of the ear canal. Treatment plans should be decided based on bacterial identification and susceptibility profiles.

==== Otitis media ====
Staphylococcus schleiferi has been identified as a contributor to Otitis media in dogs and less commonly cats. Otitis media is a condition of inflammation of the middle ear canal. Otitis Media is concurrently present in many of the cases of dogs diagnosed with Otitis Externa. If Otitis Media is not diagnosed and treated, it can lead to Otitis Externa. Signs of Otitis Media include: head shaking, vestibular signs (head tilt), and scratching of the effected ear. Diagnosis of Otitis Media is more challenging than with Otitis Externa because access to the middle ear canal can be challenging. Following diagnosis, bacterial identification is required and susceptibility testing on the bacteria is warranted to guide the microbial treatment plan. Surgery is a treatment option when antimicrobial treatment fails to resolve the clinical signs associated with Otitis Media.

=== Diseases of humans ===
Staphylococcus schleiferi has rarely been described as a human pathogen, but there are some case reports and case series reports that describe the correlation between isolation of Staphylococcus schleiferi and surgical site and wound infections.

Staphylococcus schleiferi has been described as the causative agent of surgical site and wound infections; pediatric meningitis; endocarditis; and intravascular device-related bacteremia in case reports and case series reports:

==== Surgical site and wound infections ====
Staphylococcus schleiferi has been described in a clinical case series report as causing infections at surgical sites post-operatively.

==== Pediatric meningitis ====
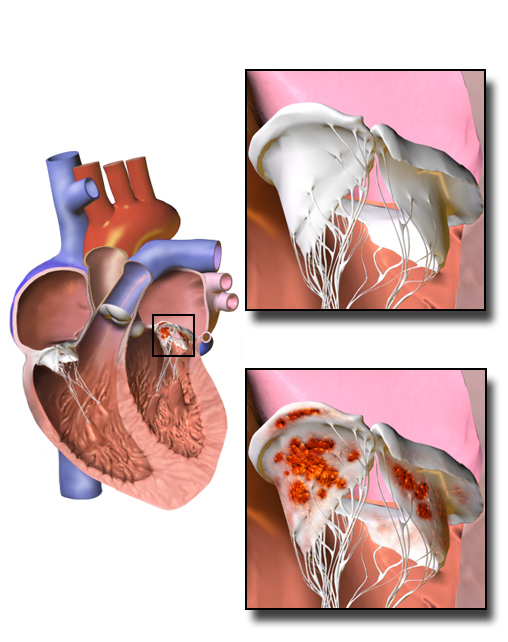
Illustration of endocarditis on a heart valve.

Meningitis refers to inflammation of the meninges. Staphylococcus schleiferi has been identified as the causative agent of meningitis in a child (6 years old) and an infant (2 months old) in case reports.

==== Endocarditis ====
Endocarditis refers to inflammation of the endocardium of the heart. Staphylococcus schleiferi was isolated as the cause of endocarditis of a prosthetic valve in a case report involving a 78-year-old man.

==== Intravascular device-related bacteremia ====
In a case report describing a 55-year-old female who had recently had a left ventricular assist device placed, Staphylococcus schleiferi was identified as the causative agent of Bacteremia. A second case was described involving a 58-year-old male who had undergone a liver transplant and subsequently developed Staphylococcus schleiferi aortic valve endocarditis.

== Diagnosis ==
A swab collected from the area of interest is regularly taken because Staphylococcus schleiferi is often associated with superficial infections of the skin for people and skin or ears for animals. Sample collection does depend on the site of interest and so an appropriate specimen is obtained based on the area of infection, such as a cystocentesis for urinary tract infections. The initial step of gram staining assists in distinguishing the characteristic gram-positive cocci in clusters for Staphylococcus species. It is then cultured on blood agar as non-pigmented round colonies that are beta-hemolytic meaning there is complete clearing of the red blood cells.

Staphylococcal species are typically differentiated based on their coagulation reaction but because Staphylococcus schleiferi is a coagulase variable species, meaning it can appear positive or negative on coagulase testing depending on the subtype, additional biochemical tests are needed to be performed. Further testing may include polymerase chain reaction (PCR) and matrix-assisted laser desorption ionization time of flight mass spectrometry (MALDI-TOF MS). PCR amplifies DNA for identification whereas MALDI-TOF uses both the mass and charge of molecules to acquire a unique peptide mass fingerprint (PMF). The PMF is matched to a database of known microbial isolates, but this database is a limitation as the database must contain the PMF for the tested organism. MALDI-TOF MS has been reliable for distinguishing S. schleiferi from other Staphylooccus species but not for identifying subspecies like schleiferi and coagulans. Clinically, subspecies identification is commonly not done as treatment is based on susceptibility testing and location of the infection.
