= Staphylococcus gallinarum =

Scientific classification
- Domain: Bacteria
- Kingdom: Bacillati
- Phylum: Bacillota
- Class: Bacilli
- Order: Bacillales
- Family: Staphylococcaceae
- Genus: Staphylococcus
- Species: S. gallinarum

Binomial name
- Staphylococcus gallinarum Devriese et al. 1983

Species of bacterium

Staphylococcus gallinarum is a Gram-positive, coagulase-negative member of the bacterial genus Staphylococcus consisting of single, paired, and clustered cocci. Strains of this species were first isolated from chickens and a pheasant. The cells contain cell walls with chemical similarity to those of Staphylococcus epidermidis. Since its initial discovery, S. gallinarum has also been found in the saliva of healthy human adults.

Staphylococcus gallinarum is not generally pathogenic, though it has been isolated from infected wounds of hospital patients, from blood of a patient with a chronic hepatitis B infection, and from an eye infection (endophthalmitis). The infection rate and morbidity of S. gallinarum is comparatively low and its effects on humans are limited.
