= Staphylococcus kloosii =

Scientific classification
- Domain: Bacteria
- Kingdom: Bacillati
- Phylum: Bacillota
- Class: Bacilli
- Order: Caryophanales
- Family: Staphylococcaceae
- Genus: Staphylococcus
- Species: S. kloosii

Binomial name
- Staphylococcus kloosii Schliefer et al. 1985

Species of bacterium

Staphylococcus kloosii in a gram-positive, coagulase-negative member of the bacterial genus Staphylococcus consisting of single, paired, and clustered cocci. Strains of this species were originally isolated from and among the most frequent constituents of normal skin flora and various wild animals.
