= Staphylococcus devriesei =

Scientific classification
- Domain: Bacteria
- Kingdom: Bacillati
- Phylum: Bacillota
- Class: Bacilli
- Order: Bacillales
- Family: Staphylococcaceae
- Genus: Staphylococcus
- Species: S. devriesei

Binomial name
- Staphylococcus devriesei Supré et al. 2010

Species of bacterium

Staphylococcus devriesei is a Gram-positive, coagulase-negative member of the bacterial genus Staphylococcus consisting of clustered cocci. It was originally isolated from cow's milk and teats, and on the basis of 16S ribosomal RNA sequence, is most genetically similar to S. haemolyticus, S. hominis, and S. lugdunensis. More recent studies have found the species on cow teat skin, but not commonly in milk, suggesting this commensal bacterium does not generally flow into milk.
