= Staphylococcus stepanovicii =

Scientific classification
- Domain: Bacteria
- Kingdom: Bacillati
- Phylum: Bacillota
- Class: Bacilli
- Order: Bacillales
- Family: Staphylococcaceae
- Genus: Staphylococcus
- Species: S. stepanovicii

Binomial name
- Staphylococcus stepanovicii Hauschild et al. 2010

Species of bacterium

Staphylococcus stepanovicii is a Gram-positive, coagulase-negative member of the bacterial genus Staphylococcus consisting of single, paired, and clustered cocci. The species is novobiocin-resistant and oxidase-positive. It was named in honor of Serbian microbiologist Srdjan Stepanović.

Staphylococcus stepanovicii has been isolated from the skin of small mammals in the wild.
