= Staphylococcus singaporensis =

Scientific classification
- Domain: Bacteria
- Kingdom: Bacillati
- Phylum: Bacillota
- Class: Bacilli
- Order: Bacillales
- Family: Staphylococcaceae
- Genus: Staphylococcus
- Species: S. singaporensis

Binomial name
- Staphylococcus singaporensis Chew et al., 2021

Species of bacterium

Staphylococcus singaporensis is a member of the Staphylococcus aureus complex that shares the complex with Staphylococcus argenteus and Staphylococcus schweitzeri. The species was discovered in 2021 and published in the International Journal of Systematic and Evolutionary Microbiology on 26 October. Staphylococcus singaporensis was named after Singapore.
