= Staphylococcus lutrae =

Scientific classification
- Domain: Bacteria
- Kingdom: Bacillati
- Phylum: Bacillota
- Class: Bacilli
- Order: Bacillales
- Family: Staphylococcaceae
- Genus: Staphylococcus
- Species: S. lutrae

Binomial name
- Staphylococcus lutrae Foster et al. 1997

Species of bacterium

Staphylococcus lutrae is a species of Gram-positive bacteria and a member of the genus Staphylococcus. Strains of this species were originally isolated from otters and are coagulase-positive.
