= Fermented sausage =

Type of preserved meat

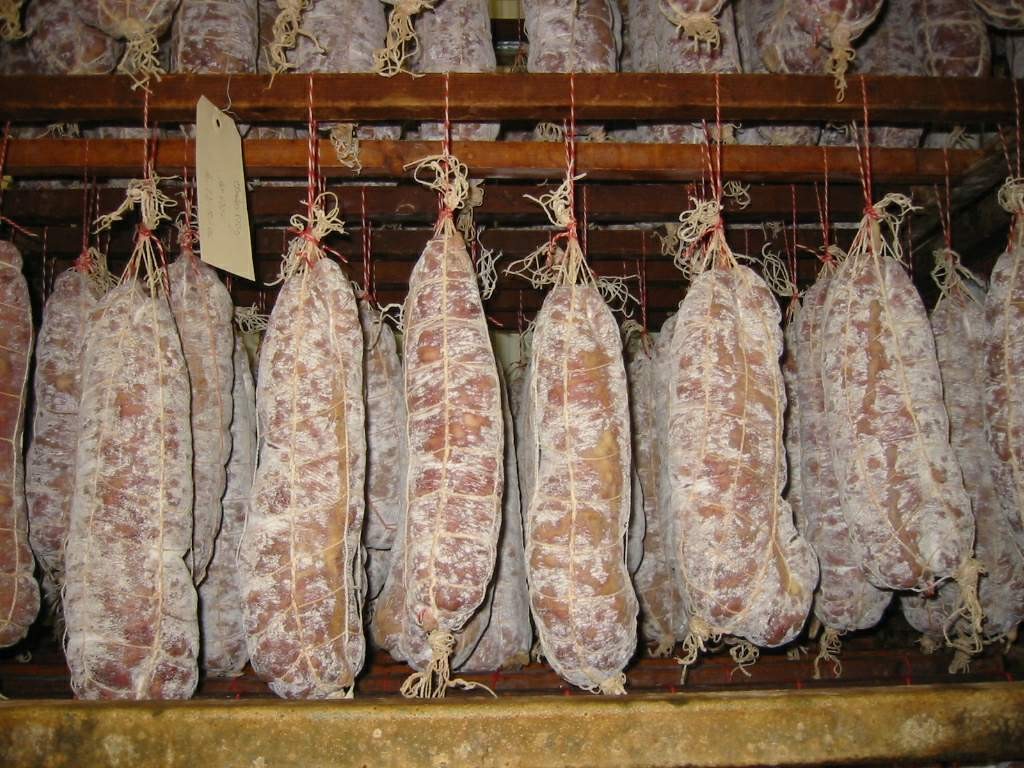
Saucisson, a fermented family of sausages of French origin

Fermented sausage, or dry sausage, is a type of sausage made by salting chopped or ground meat to remove moisture, while allowing beneficial bacteria to break down sugars into flavorful molecules. Bacteria, including Lactobacillus species and Leuconostoc species, break down these sugars to produce lactic acid, which not only affects the flavor of the sausage, but also lowers the pH from 6.0 to 4.5–5.0, preventing the growth of bacteria that could spoil the sausage. These effects are magnified during the drying process, as the salt and acidity are concentrated as moisture is extracted.

The ingredients found in a fermented sausage include meat, fat, bacterial culture, salt, spices, sugar and nitrite. Nitrite is commonly added to fermented sausages to speed up the curing of meat and also impart an attractive colour while preventing the growth of the Clostridium botulinum bacteria which causes botulism. Some traditional and artisanal producers avoid nitrites. Sugar is added to aid the bacterial production of lactic acid during the 18-hour to three-day fermentation process; the fermentation time depends on the temperature at which the sausage is stored: the lower the temperature, the longer the required fermentation period. A white mold and yeast sometimes adheres to the outside of the sausage during the drying process. This mold adds to the flavor of the sausage and aids in preventing harmful bacteria from attaching to the sausage.

The two main types of fermented sausage are the dry, salted, spiced sausages found in warmer climates and fermented semidry sausages found in cooler, more humid climates. Since the dry sausages of the Mediterranean, in countries such as Italy, Spain, and Portugal contain 25–35% water and more than 4% salt, they may be stored at room temperature. The sausages of northern Europe usually contain less salt (around 3%) and 40–50% water, and as such do not dry well in the humid climate of countries such as Germany.

== Microbiology ==
Fermented sausage harbor a variety of lactic acid-producing bacteria and, depending on the style, occasionally fungi. Fermentation not only decreases the pH by lactic acid production, but also produces a variety of flavor compounds through lipolysis. The texture is changed by proteolysis and a reduction in water content.

As with other fermented foods, well-defined starter cultures are used commercially to ensure the introduction of the desired types of microbes. Latilactobacillus sakei, Staphylococcus carnosus, various other Staphylococcus species, and Penicillium aurantiogriseum mold have been used as components of a starter culture.

== See also ==
- Charcuterie
- Sausage
- List of sausages
