= Staphylococcus auricularis =

Scientific classification
- Domain: Bacteria
- Kingdom: Bacillati
- Phylum: Bacillota
- Class: Bacilli
- Order: Bacillales
- Family: Staphylococcaceae
- Genus: Staphylococcus
- Species: S. auricularis

Binomial name
- Staphylococcus auricularis Kloos and Schliefer 1983

Species of bacterium

Staphylococcus auricularis is a Gram-positive member of the bacterial genus Staphylococcus consisting of pairs or tetrads of cocci. This species was originally isolated from the exterior of a human ear and is weakly hemolytic. Because it commonly exists on human skin, it may be able to cause opportunistic infections or sepsis, although this is very rare.
