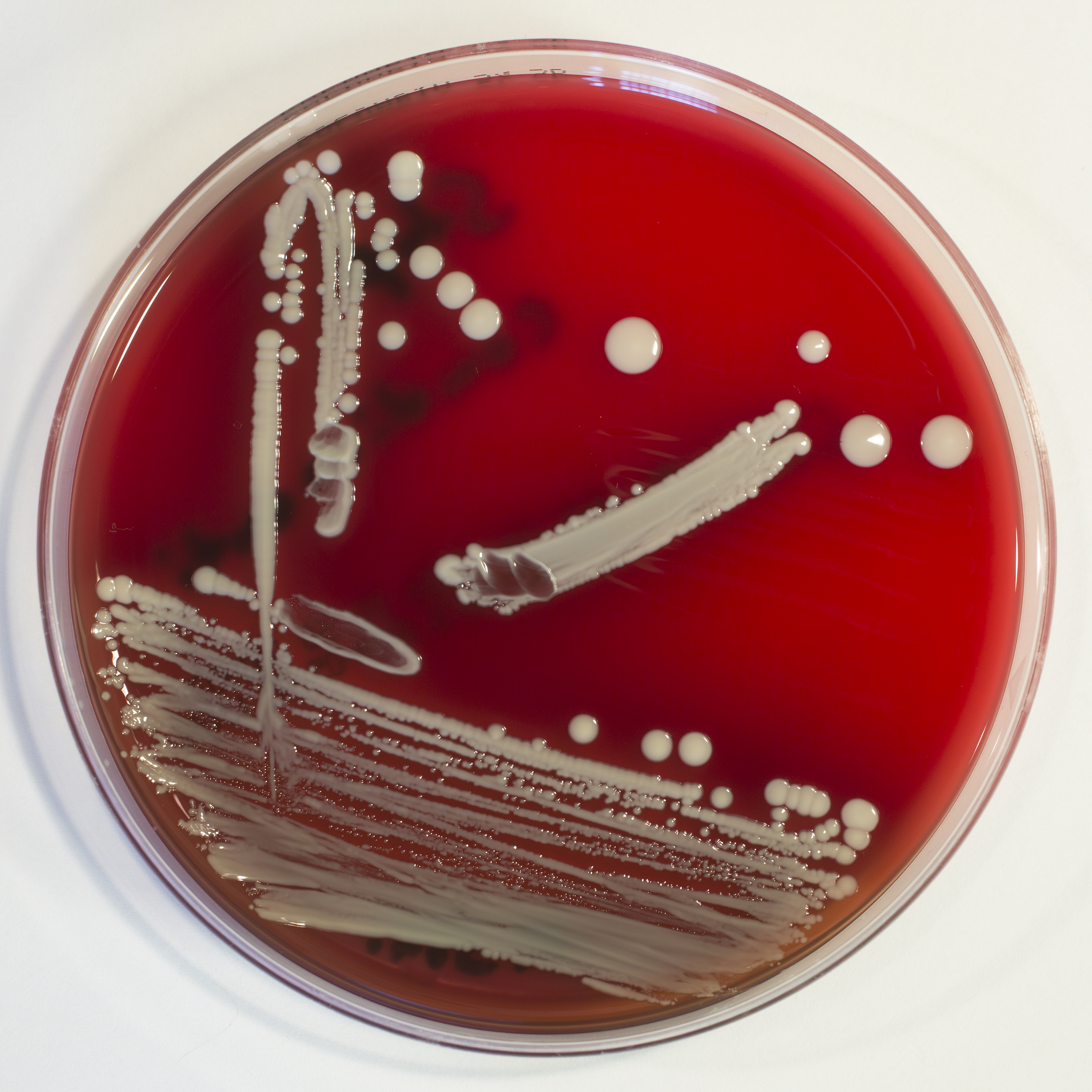
- Staphylococcus condimenti colonies on Columbia sheep blood agar, colonies shown with reflected light (for detecting hemolysis transmitted light is recommended).

Scientific classification
- Domain: Bacteria
- Kingdom: Bacillati
- Phylum: Bacillota
- Class: Bacilli
- Order: Bacillales
- Family: Staphylococcaceae
- Genus: Staphylococcus
- Species: S. condimenti

Binomial name
- Staphylococcus condimenti Probst et al. 1998

= Staphylococcus condimenti =

Species of bacterium

Staphylococcus condimenti is a Gram-positive, coagulase-negative member of the bacterial genus Staphylococcus consisting of single, paired, and clustered cocci. Strains of this species were originally isolated from fermenting soy sauce mash and are positive for catalase, urease, arginine dihydrolase, nitrate reductase, beta-galactosidase, and phosphatase activity.

Unlike some clinical Staphylococcus isolates and some food-derived strains, S. condimenti has shown no noticeable resistance to antibiotics including lincomycin and penicillin.
