= Staphylococcus chromogenes =

Scientific classification
- Domain: Bacteria
- Kingdom: Bacillati
- Phylum: Bacillota
- Class: Bacilli
- Order: Caryophanales
- Family: Staphylococcaceae
- Genus: Staphylococcus
- Species: S. chromogenes

Binomial name
- Staphylococcus chromogenes (Devriese et al. 1978) Hájek et al. 1987

Species of bacterium

Staphylococcus chromogenes is a Gram-positive, coagulase-negative member of the bacterial genus Staphylococcus consisting of clustered cocci. The species is associated with mastitis in dairy animals.

S. chromogenes can be a coagulase-variable Staphylococcus sp., with rare but individual populations displaying clotting activity.
