= Staphylococcus taiwanensis =

Scientific classification
- Domain: Bacteria
- Kingdom: Bacillati
- Phylum: Bacillota
- Class: Bacilli
- Order: Caryophanales
- Family: Staphylococcaceae
- Genus: Staphylococcus
- Species: S. taiwanensis

Binomial name
- Staphylococcus taiwanensis Lin et al. 2022

Species of bacterium

Staphylococcus taiwanensis is a species of coagulase-negative, gram-positive bacteria from the family Staphylococcaceae. It was first isolated from human blood in 2022.

== Description ==
Staphylococcus taiwanensis is a species of coagulase-negative Staphylococci. Colonies of S. taiwanensis are beta-hemolytic. S. taiwanensis can be differentiated from the phylogentically and morphologically similar Staphylococcus haemolyticus by its production of urease.
