= Staphylococcus felis =

Scientific classification
- Domain: Bacteria
- Kingdom: Bacillati
- Phylum: Bacillota
- Class: Bacilli
- Order: Bacillales
- Family: Staphylococcaceae
- Genus: Staphylococcus
- Species: S. felis

Binomial name
- Staphylococcus felis Igimi et al. 1989

Species of bacterium

Staphylococcus felis is a Gram-positive, coagulase-negative member of the bacterial genus Staphylococcus consisting of clustered cocci. It demonstrates limited hemolytic activity, but it does show evidence of urease activity and the ability to use sucrose, mannose, and trehalose. S. felis has been isolated from and is associated with skin infections in cats.
