= Staphylococcus cornubiensis =

Scientific classification
- Domain: Bacteria
- Kingdom: Bacillati
- Phylum: Bacillota
- Class: Bacilli
- Order: Bacillales
- Family: Staphylococcaceae
- Genus: Staphylococcus
- Species: S. cornubiensis

Binomial name
- Staphylococcus cornubiensis Murray et al. 2018

Species of bacterium

Staphylococcus cornubiensis is a species of Gram-positive cocci in the Staphylococcus intermedius Group (SIG): a group of genetically and phenotypically similar bacterial species that were previously identified as S. intermedius. The bacterium was first isolated from a human skin infection in Cornwall, United Kingdom. However, its presence in other species and/or pathologies has yet to be discussed in the literature. Another SIG bacterium, S. pseudintermedius, has also been implicated in cutaneous infections in humans–as a result of zoonotic transmission from domestic animals. The other SIG species have been isolated from various wild and domestic animals; such as dogs, cats, horses, camels, and dolphins, among others.

== Discovery ==
S. cornubiensis was first described in a 2018 paper that discussed improved methods of detecting SIG species. The sample of the bacterium was collected in Cornwall, United Kingdom from a 64-year-old man with cellulitis. Designated strain NW1, S. cornubiensis was distinguished from other samples (all identified as S. pseudointermedius) due to differences in the sodA and hsp60 sequences. A following study–involving the same researchers and others–later identified NW1 as a novel species within SIG.
