= Staphylococcus rostri =

Scientific classification
- Domain: Bacteria
- Kingdom: Bacillati
- Phylum: Bacillota
- Class: Bacilli
- Order: Bacillales
- Family: Staphylococcaceae
- Genus: Staphylococcus
- Species: S. rostri

Binomial name
- Staphylococcus rostri Riesen and Perreten 2009

Species of bacterium

Staphylococcus rostri is a Gram-positive, coagulase-negative member of the bacterial genus Staphylococcus consisting of clustered cocci. This species was originally isolated from the noses of healthy pigs; the name is derived from the Latin rostrum or "the snout of a swine".

Staphylococcus rostri may serve as a source or reservoir of antibiotic resistance genes seen in Staphylococcus aureus.
