= Mammaliicoccus sciuri =

Scientific classification
- Domain: Bacteria
- Kingdom: Bacillati
- Phylum: Bacillota
- Class: Bacilli
- Order: Caryophanales
- Family: Staphylococcaceae
- Genus: Mammaliicoccus
- Species: M. sciuri

Binomial name
- Mammaliicoccus sciuri Madhaiyan et al. 2020

Species of bacterium

Mammaliicoccus sciuri, previously Staphylococcus sciuri, is a Gram-positive, oxidase-positive, coagulase-negative member of the bacterial genus Mammaliicoccus consisting of clustered cocci. The type subspecies M. sciuri subsp. sciuri was originally known as Staphylococcus sciuri subsp. sciuri and used to categorize 35 strains shown to use cellobiose, galactose, sucrose, and glycerol. M. sciuri species have been found to carry genes that can be transmitted to other bacteria, increasing their pathogenicity. M. sciuri has been found in a wide range of environments, including domestic and wild animals, humans, and plants.

The mecA gene was originally found in M. sciuri. An undefined function in this gene can be recruited for antibiotic resistance under certain conditions of drug selection.

In 2020, Madhaiyan et al. renamed the genus for M. sciuri from Staphylococcus to Mammaliicoccus.
