= Staphylococcus argenteus =

Scientific classification
- Domain: Bacteria
- Kingdom: Bacillati
- Phylum: Bacillota
- Class: Bacilli
- Order: Caryophanales
- Family: Staphylococcaceae
- Genus: Staphylococcus
- Species: S. argenteus

Binomial name
- Staphylococcus argenteus Tong et al. 2015

Species of bacterium

Staphylococcus argenteus are gram-positive cocci from the genus Staphylococcus which have been isolated from blood culture of a 55-year-old Indigenous Australian female in 2006 in Darwin, Northern Territory, Australia. The species is closely related to S. aureus and the differentiation is challenging. While it is hard to differentiate between S. aureus and S. argenteus, it can be done via multilocus sequence typing (MSLT). S. argenteus can cause infections in the blood stream, skin/soft tissue, bones and joints. The species has also been identified in cases of food poisoning. Staphylococcus argenteus is cytotoxic to human cells due to high expression of alpha-hemolysin.

Whole-genome comparisons prove that S. argenteus shares half of its core genome with Staphylococcus aureus, supporting its independent classification and separate monophyletic groups. The species has been linked to skin, respiratory, and bloodstream infections. The virulence and antibiotic-resistance genes differ between strains, but all contain genomic islands like those in S. aureus. Several isolates in Thailand contained unique livestock-associated genes, including tetracycline resistance genes and exotoxins previously observed in S. aureus, indicating the potential for gene transfer between the two Staphylococcus species. ST2250 sequence type is the most dominant strain, especially in Thailand, but the entire species has been isolated in 14 countries. There have been reports of methicillin-resistant strains of the species in Dutch hospitals dating back to 2008, displaying its ability to transmit and spread antibiotic resistance genes.
