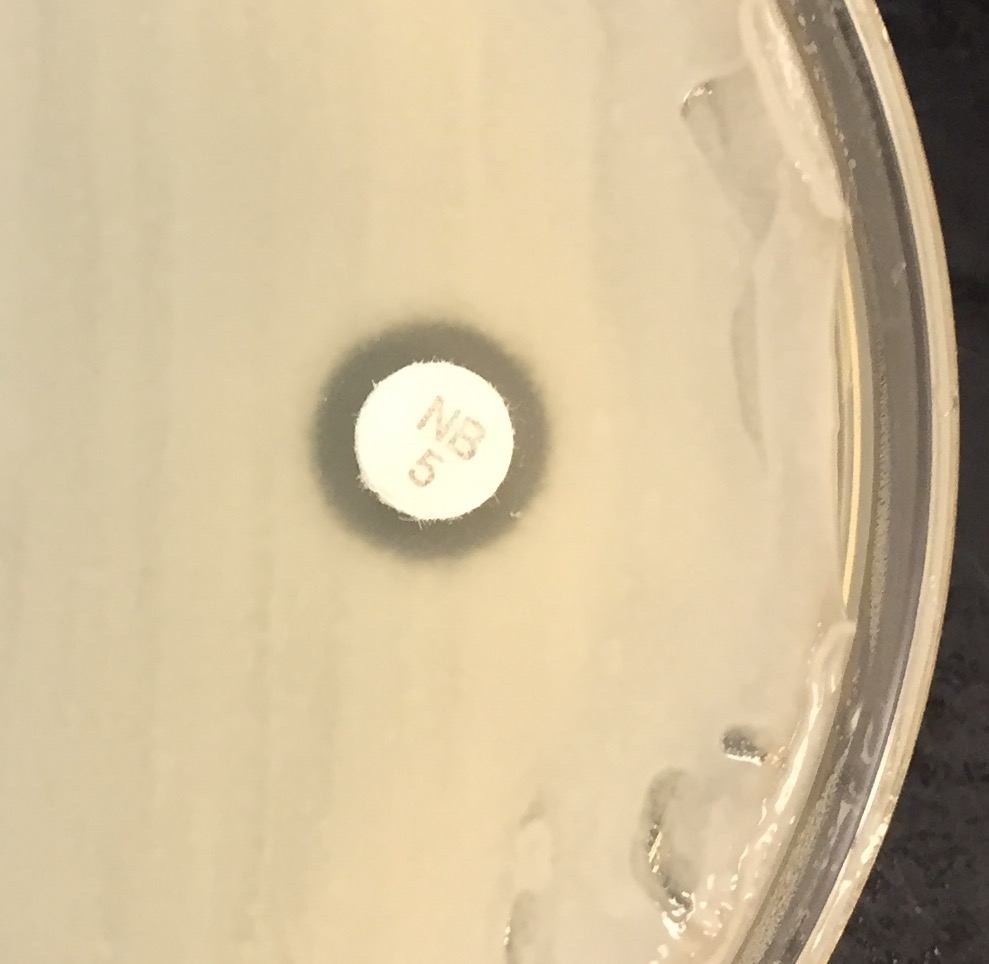
- S. saprophyticus on Mueller–Hinton agar exhibiting resistance to novobiocin characteristic for species identification
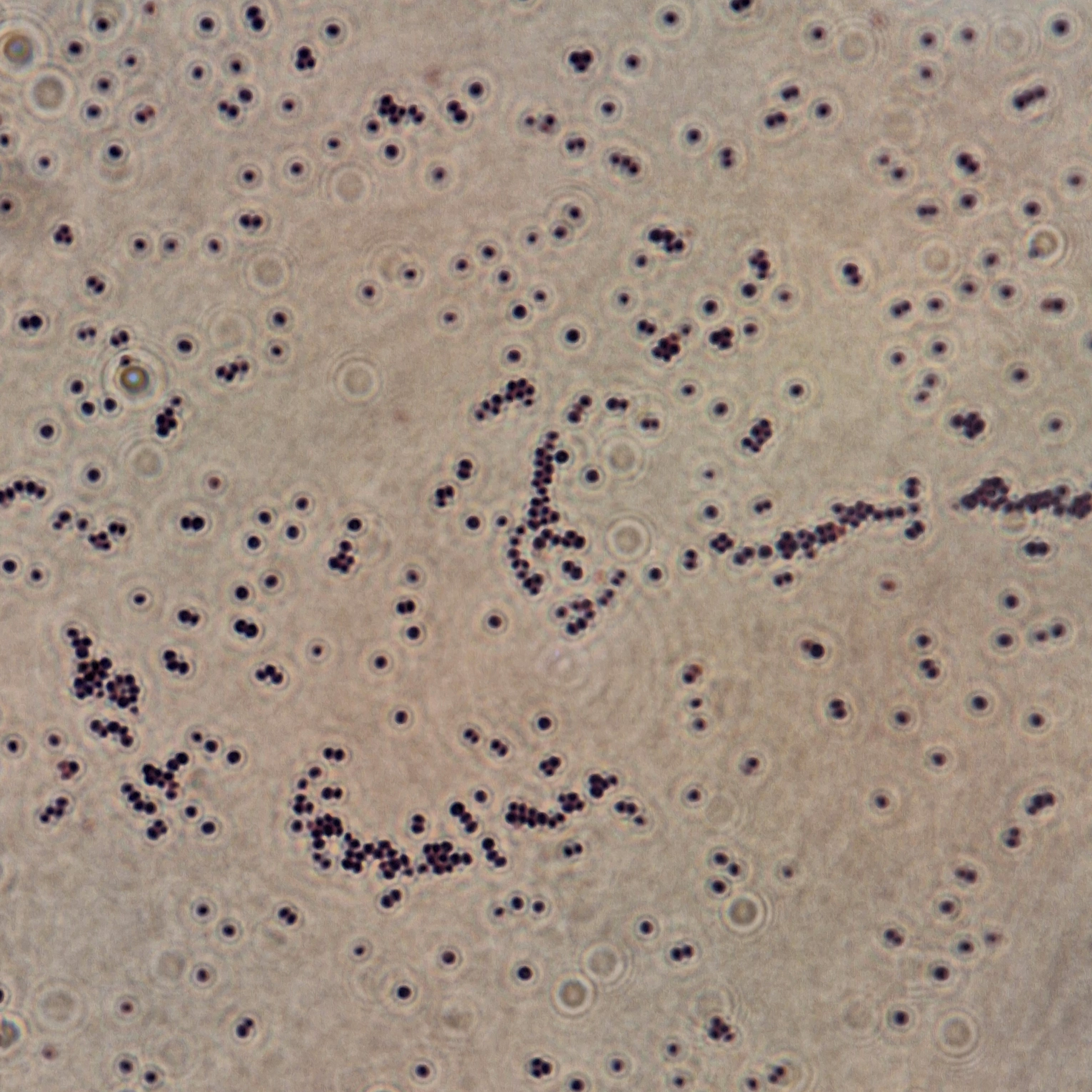
- Gram stain of a Gram positive S. saprophyticus sample suspension, lab cultured on tryptic soy agar (TSA)

Scientific classification
- Domain: Bacteria
- Kingdom: Bacillati
- Phylum: Bacillota
- Class: Bacilli
- Order: Caryophanales
- Family: Staphylococcaceae
- Genus: Staphylococcus
- Species: S. saprophyticus

Binomial name
- Staphylococcus saprophyticus (Fairbrother 1940) Shaw et al. 1951

= Staphylococcus saprophyticus =

Species of bacterium

Staphylococcus saprophyticus is a Gram-positive coccus belonging to the genus Staphylococcus. S. saprophyticus is a common cause of community-acquired urinary tract infections.

== History ==
Staphylococcus saprophyticus was not recognized as a cause of urinary tract infections until the early 1970s, more than 10 years after its original demonstration in urine specimens. Prior to this, the presence of coagulase-negative staphylococci (CoNS) in urine specimens was dismissed as contamination.

== Epidemiology and pathogenesis ==
In humans, S. saprophyticus is found in the normal flora of the female genital tract and perineum. It has been isolated from other sources, too, including meat and cheese products, vegetables, the environment, and human and animal gastrointestinal tracts. S. saprophyticus causes 10–20% of urinary tract infections (UTIs). In females 17–27 years old, it is the second-most common cause of community-acquired UTIs, after Escherichia coli. Sexual activity increases the risk of S. saprophyticus UTIs because bacteria are displaced from the normal flora of the vagina and perineum into the urethra. Most cases occur within 24 hours of sex, earning this infection the nickname "honeymoon cystitis". S. saprophyticus has the capacity to selectively adhere to human urothelium. The adhesin for S. saprophyticus is a lactosamine structure. S. saprophyticus produces no exotoxins.

== Clinical features ==
Patients with urinary tract infections caused by S. saprophyticus usually present with symptomatic cystitis. Symptoms include a burning sensation when passing urine, the urge to urinate more often than usual, a 'dripping effect' after urination, weak bladder, a bloated feeling with sharp razor pains in the lower abdomen around the bladder and ovary areas, and razor-like pains during sexual intercourse. Flank pain may occur due to infection of the upper urinary tract, such as pyelonephritis. Signs and symptoms of renal involvement are also often registered.

== Laboratory diagnosis ==
The urine sediment of a patient with a S. saprophyticus urinary tract infection has a characteristic appearance under the microscope manifesting leukocytes, erythrocytes, and clumping due to cocci adhering to cellular elements. Chemical screening methods for bacteriuria, such as, urine nitrate and glucose do not always detect S. saprophyticus infection. This is because unlike Gram-negative Enterobacteriaceae urinary tract infections, S. saprophyticus does not reduce nitrate and has a longer generation time, thus does not consume glucose as rapidly. Even when such an infection occurs above the neck of the bladder, low numbers of colony-forming units (less than 10^{5} cfu/ml) are often present.

Staphylococcus saprophyticus is identified as belonging to the genus Staphylococcus using the Gram stain and catalase test. It is identitified as a species of coagulase-negative staphylococci (CoNS) using the coagulase test. Lastly, S. saprophyticus is differentiated from S. epidermidis, another species of pathogenic CoNS, by testing for susceptibility to the antibiotic novobiocin. S. saprophyticus is novobiocin-resistant, whereas S. epidermidis is novobiocin-sensitive.

== Treatment ==
Staphylococcus saprophyticus urinary tract infections are usually treated with trimethoprim-sulfamethoxazole or with a quinolone such as to be alone norfloxacin. It has also been shown to be susceptible to ampicillin & ceftriaxone.

The many home remedies or natural treatments for urinary tract infections are not clinically proven, such as cranberry juice, alkalinization, and many types of common herbs and spices. Some show promise, such as to affect the formation of biofilms on surfaces or medical equipment, and in other in vitro situations.

== Different subspecies ==
Two subspecies of S. saprophyticus exist: S. s. bovis and S. s. saprophyticus, the latter has colony diameter of > 5mm, and more commonly found in human UTIs. S. s. saprophyticus is nitrate-reductase negative and pyrrolidonyl-arylamidase negative, while S. saprophyticus bovis has colony diameter of < 5mm, nitrate-reductase positive and pyrolidonyl-arylamidase positive.
