= Staphylococcus piscifermentans =

Scientific classification
- Domain: Bacteria
- Kingdom: Bacillati
- Phylum: Bacillota
- Class: Bacilli
- Order: Bacillales
- Family: Staphylococcaceae
- Genus: Staphylococcus
- Species: S. piscifermentans

Binomial name
- Staphylococcus piscifermentans Tanasupawat et al. 1992

Species of bacterium

Staphylococcus piscifermentans is a Gram-positive, coagulase-negative member of the bacterial genus Staphylococcus consisting of clustered cocci. This species was originally isolated from fermented fish in Thailand. A later study found a strain of S. piscifermentans in dog feces. The species is used in the preparation of fermented foods along with Staphylococcus carnosus; both species reduce nitrate and produce ammonia.
