= Staphylococcus pseudintermedius =

Scientific classification
- Domain: Bacteria
- Kingdom: Bacillati
- Phylum: Bacillota
- Class: Bacilli
- Order: Caryophanales
- Family: Staphylococcaceae
- Genus: Staphylococcus
- Species: S. pseudintermedius

Binomial name
- Staphylococcus pseudintermedius Devriese et al. 2005

Species of bacterium

Staphylococcus pseudintermedius is a gram-positive spherically shaped bacterium of the genus Staphylococcus found worldwide. It is primarily a pathogen for domestic animals, but has been known to affect humans as well. S. pseudintermedius is an opportunistic pathogen that secretes immune-modulating virulence factors, has many adhesion factors, and the potential to create biofilms, all of which help to determine the pathogenicity of the bacterium. Diagnoses of S. pseudintermedius have traditionally been made using cytology, plating, and biochemical tests. More recently, molecular technologies like MALDI-TOF, DNA hybridization and PCR have become preferred over biochemical tests for their more rapid and accurate identifications. This includes the identification and diagnosis of antibiotic resistant strains.

== Morphology and classification ==
Staphylococci spp. are a genus of gram positive cocci of 0.5 - 1 μm diameter. Staphylococcus pseudintermedius is a non-motile and non-spore forming, facultatively anaerobic bacterium. It appears primarily as grape-like clusters morphologically, but can also be seen as individual or paired cocci. This clustered configuration, as well as the positive catalase test, differentiates Staphylococcus spp. from Streptococcus spp., which manifests in chains. Due to its ability to clot blood, S. pseudintermedius is subcategorized into a group of coagulase positive (CoPS) staphylococci. CoPS strains typically express more virulence factors. This CoPS characteristic is a contributing factor to its biochemical similarities to S.aureus.

Staphylococcal organisms belong to the Staphylococcaceae family. S. aureus and Staphylococcus epidermidis are other notable species which fall into the same genus as S. pseudintermedius, under this taxonomic categorization. S. pseudintermedius, Staphylococcus intermedius, and Staphylococcus delphini are largely phenotypically indiscriminate and therefore comprise the 'Staphylococcus intermedius group' of organisms. Biochemical properties of these three organisms place them as an intermediate between S. aureus and S. epidermidis.

Staphylococcus pseudintermedius was first identified as a novel species in 2005 using 16S rRNA gene sequencing of the tRNA intergenic length polymorphisms of the AJ780976 gene loci. Differing strains of S. pseudintermedius, LMG 22219 - LMG 22222, have been identified in various species: cat, horse, dog, and parrot, respectively. These strains comprise a Staphylococcal species that is distinct from other species within the genus, as distinguished by DNA hybridizations of genome sequences. Previously, many S. pseudintermedius infections or isolates were identified as Staphylococcus intermedius, before its identification as a distinct species.

Isolation of S. pseudintermedius from the skin and mucosa of healthy canine can be between 20 and 90%, with these frequencies being reduced in healthy felines to 5-45%. It is the most commonly identified Staphylococcus spp. in these animal species. S. pseudintermedius is classified as a biocontainment risk level 2 organism due to its moderately pathogenic characteristics.

== Diagnosis ==
=== Cytology ===
Using the Gram stain technique, staphylococci are easily identified by their clumped, gram-positive, coccus morphology. Slides can be prepared directly using a patient swab, which lends to convenience in the clinic or classroom. However, given that S. pseudintermedius is prevalent within the normal microbiota of numerous species, it is better identified as the agent of disease when a corresponding immune reaction is also observed. Where available, the need to identify immune reactors can be avoided by first inoculating the sample onto differential agar like Staphylococcus Medium 110, which inhibit the growth of non-staphylococcal bacteria. Cytology alone does not allow for the differentiation between different species in the Staphylococcus genus.

=== Plating ===
When plated on sheep or bovine blood agar, S. pseudintermedius displays incomplete ß-hemolysis. Colonies of S. pseudintermedius on sheep agar are described as medium in size and non-pigmented or grey-white. This can be useful for differentiating S. pseudintermedius from coagulase-negative staphylococci, and from S. aureus which tends to be yellow and displays more variable hemolytic patterns on agar. S. pseudintermedius colonies are not hemolytic on equine blood agar. While plating may help differentiate species, biochemical or DNA testing may be necessary.

=== Biochemical tests ===
Historically, biochemical tests have been an important tool used to discriminate between Staphylococcus species. Tests used to identify S. pseudintermedius specifically include DNase, hyaluronidase, coagulase, catalase, and acetoin production tests, amongst others. It can still be difficult to differentiate between members of the S. intermedius group using these methods alone; in veterinary medicine, such diagnoses have relied on the assumption that S. pseudintermedius is the only known member of this group to infect canine skin. More recently, studies using molecular identification methods have found that different S. pseudintermedius strains harbor more phenotypic diversity than previously thought. It has been speculated that these differences have led to underestimation of the importance of S. pseudintermedius in human skin infections. Further, for this reason, S. pseudintermedius is no longer considered to be reliably identifiable using commercially available biochemical tests alone. More sensitive methods like MALDI-TOF have therefore since become preferred.

=== Identification of methicillin resistance ===
Molecular methods, like MALDI-TOF and qPCR primers, are the gold standard for accurately identifying the presence of the mecA gene, which confers resistance to beta-lactam drugs. However, methicillin resistance can still be identified reliably using biochemical or phenotypic methods, such as disc diffusion. Although cefoxitin disks have been used, oxacillin disks are considered to be much more sensitive, and thus a more accurate method for predicting methicillin resistance in S. pseudintermedius strains.

== Epidemiology ==
In dogs, S. pseudintermedius is normally found on the microbiota of the skin. The presence of S. pseudintermediushas been observed in higher amounts on dogs that suffer from atopic dermatitis. It is also one of the leading causes of bacterial skin and soft tissue infections, such as pyoderma, urinary tract infections, and surgical site infections. It is also known to infect cats, although not as common. It is transferred by animal-animal contact, and some dog-human zoonoses have also been reported. Transmission is done either vertically or horizontally. The overall prevalence of S. pseudintermedius in small animals is increasing every year, specifically in small animals worldwide.

Staphylococcus pseudintermedius is becoming a threat due to its heterogeneous qualities and multi-drug resistance phenotype. Methicillin-resistant S. pseudintermedius (MRSP) has five major clonal complex (CC) lineages, each with their own unique traits regarding genetic diversity, geographical distribution and antimicrobial resistance. The majority of all MRSP isolates were found in Europe and Asia, with North America, South America, and Oceania contributing only a small portion. The CC71 and CC258 lineages were mostly seen in Europe, CC68 was mostly seen in North America, and CC45 and CC112 seen in Asia. The top three antimicrobials worldwide that MRSP is found to be resistant to are erythromycin, clindamycin, and tetracycline.

When looking at the epidemiology of the S. intermedius group (SIG), which includes S. pseudintermedius, S. intermedius, and S. delphini, it is noted that in humans most of the recorded cases were above the age of 50, diabetic, and/or immunocompromised in some way. Most of the cultures came from wound sites and respiratory specimens. S. pseudintermedius is not normally found within the microbiota of humans. Humans that work in close proximity to animals are at higher risk of S. pseudintermedius infections, such as veterinarians, animal trainers, and zookeepers. Although the risk of pet owners becoming infected by their pets is low, there have been reported cases.

== Pathogenicity and virulence ==
As previously described, S. pseudintermedius, an opportunistic pathogen, is a part of the normal microbiome of the skin and mucous membranes in animals. Animals acquire this bacterium through vertical transmission with transfer of S. pseudintermedius from the mother's vaginal mucous membrane to their offspring during birth. A compromised immune system or tissue injury allows this bacterium to push past host defences leading to infection. This results in clinical manifestations such as purulent dermatitis, otitis externa, conjunctivitis, urinary tract infections, and post-operative infections. Disease is most commonly seen in dogs and cats with canine pyoderma being the most notable manifestation of S. pseudintermedius.

The virulence of S. pseudintermedius is an area of on going research and has many unknowns. The virulence factors carried by S. pseudintermedius vary between strains and do not determine if it will cause an infection. Rather, infection is a result of an animal's immune status, environment, and genetics.

Numerous virulence factors such as enzymes, toxins, and binding proteins have been associated with different S. pseudintermedius strains. These include proteases, thermonucleases, coagulases, DNAase, lipase, hemolysin, clumping factor, leukotoxin, enterotoxin, protein A, and exfoliative toxin.

=== Immune-modulating virulence factors ===
Haemolysins, leukotoxins, exfoliative toxins, and enterotoxins are secreted from the bacteria to modulate the host's immune response.

The pore-forming cytotoxins, α-hemolysin and β-hemolysin, lyse erythrocytes of sheep and rabbits. Leukotoxin destroys host leukocytes and causes tissue necrosis. Exfoliative toxin is responsible for the majority of symptoms seen in canine pyoderma and otitis i.e. skin exfoliation and crusting. Exfoliative toxin causes vesicle formation and erosion in epithelial cells resulting in splitting of the skin. Super-antigens such as enterotoxins activate host immune cells causing T cell proliferation and cytokine release. This virulence factor induces vomiting and has been associated with food poisoning in humans. Protein A, an immunoglobulin binding protein, has been found on the surface of S. pseudintermedius. Protein A attaches to the Fc region of host antibodies, rendering them useless. Without the Fc region, the host immune system cannot recognize that antibody; the complement system cannot be activated and phagocytes cannot destroy the bacteria.

=== Virulence factors for dissemination and adhesion ===
The previously mentioned protein A, as well as clumping factor, are surface proteins that allow the bacteria to bind to host cells. S. pseudintermedius has been found to produce biofilms, an extracellular matrix of protein, DNA, and polysaccharide, which aids the bacteria in avoiding the host immune system and resisting drugs. Biofilms allow the bacteria to persist on medical equipment even after disinfection and adhere to host cells, a component of chronic infections. Fragments of a biofilm can break off and disseminate to other sites in the body, spreading infection. Quorum sensing, a mechanism that coordinates the bacteria's colonization efforts, has been reported in some strains. Coagulase, lipase, and DNAase produced by the bacteria also aid in its dissemination throughout the host body.

== Zoonosis ==
Staphyloccus pseudintermedius has zoonotic potential as it has been found in humans that live with companion animals in the same household. S. pseudintermedius is not a normal commensal bacterium found in humans, however it is capable of adapting to the human microbiota and has become increasingly more common. People at the highest risk for contracting this pathogen are pet owners and veterinarians due to their higher contact with dogs and to a lesser extent cats. The most common colonization site in the human body is within the nasal cavity and from here, the bacteria can cause infections. S. pseudintermedius infections in a human host have been known to cause endocarditis, post-surgical infections, inflammation of the nasal cavity (rhinosinusitis) and catheter-related bacteremia. Staphyloccus pseudintermedius becomes established in a human wound, it has the ability to form antibiotic resistance biofilms. Mechanisms of biofilm resistance of S. pseudintermedius are likely multifactorial and may help to establish infections in humans.

=== Resistance in humans ===
There is an increasing prevalence of antibiotic resistance in S. pseudintermedius, specifically to methicillin, which makes it challenging to treat in humans. Veterinary dermatologists are exposed to animals with skin and soft infections that commonly possess MRSP (methicillin‐resistant Staphylococcus pseudintermedius). Veterinarians have been found to be colonized with MRSP but not MSSP (methicillin‐susceptible S. pseudintermedius). Treatment of human MRSP infections is done with antibiotics and these should not be used for treatment in animals. Oral antimicrobial treatment for active infection is commonly done with the use of mupirocin, linezolid, quinupristin, rifampicin or vancomyocin are possible treatments. Hand washing, sterilizing equipment and hygiene practices should be implemented to decrease the spread of Staphylococcus infections.
