= Storax balsam =

Resin from the genus Liquidambar

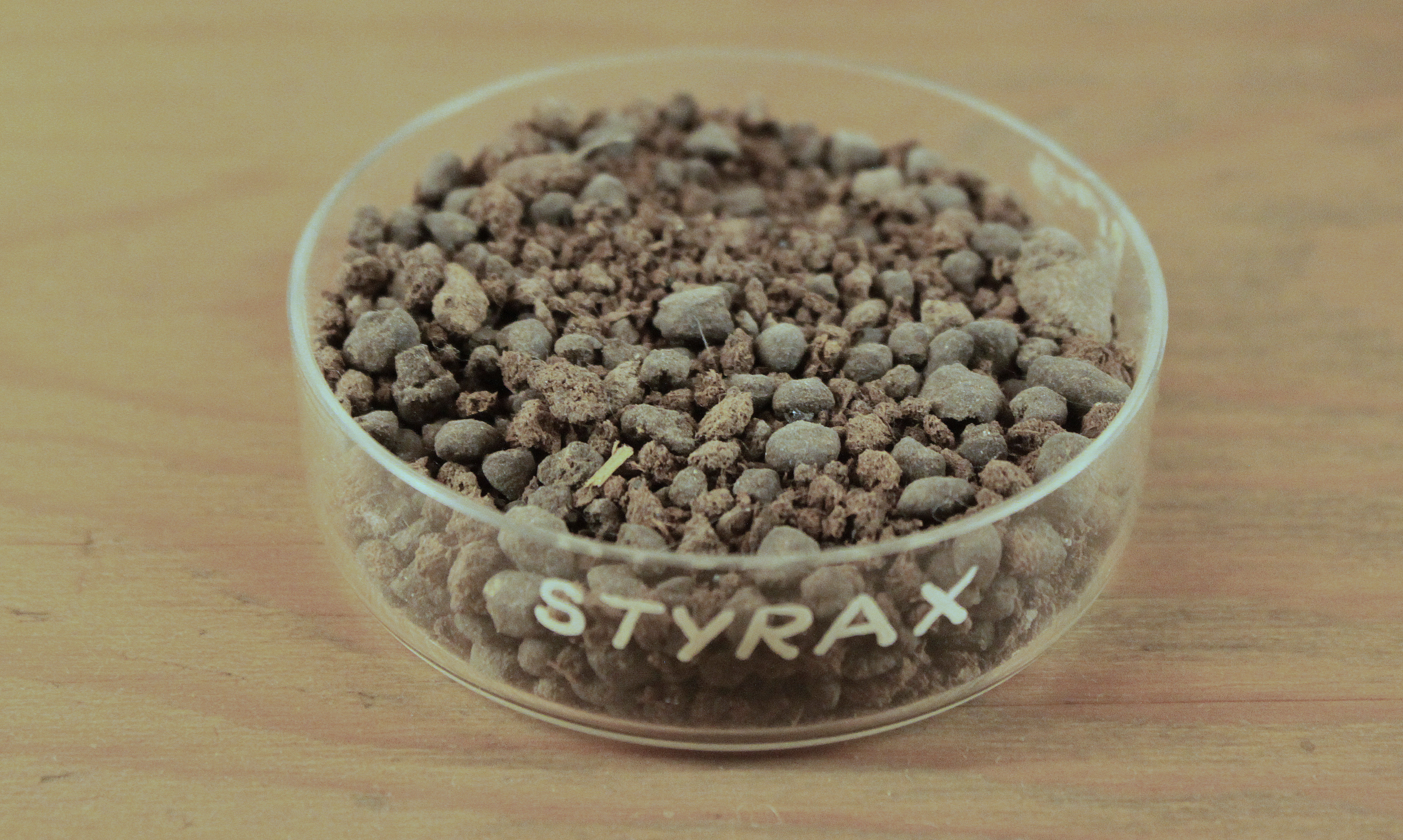
Dry storax

Storax (Latin: storax; Greek: στύραξ, stúrax), often commercially sold as styrax, is a natural fragrant resin isolated from the wounded bark of Liquidambar orientalis Mill. (Asia Minor) and Liquidambar styraciflua L. (Eastern US, Mexico, Central America) (Altingiaceae). It is distinct from benzoin (also called "storax"), a similar resin obtained from the Styracaceae plant family.

== Composition ==
Purified storax contains about 33–50% storesin, an alcoholic resin, 5–15% cinnamic acid, 5–15% cinnamyl cinnamate, about 10% phenylpropyl cinnamate, as well small amounts of ethyl cinnamate, benzyl cinnamate, and styrene. Some may contain traces of vanillin or triterpenic acids (oleanolic and 3-epioleanolic acids).

== Uses ==
Storax has a balsamic, floral/lilac, and leathery smell. It and its derivatives (resinoid, essential oil, absolute) are used as flavors and fragrances, as well as in pharmaceuticals (Friar's Balsam). American storax resin (Liquidambar styraciflua), when used as a gum, is meant to work as a breath freshener and clean teeth.

== History ==
Mnesimachus, Aristotle, Theophrastus (Historia Plantarum), Herodotus, and Strabo mention the storax tree and its balsam. In ancient Greece, storax also denoted the spike at the lower end of a spearshaft.

Multiple rites call for storax in the Graeco-Egyptian Greek Magical Papyri.

Pliny (Historia Naturalis 12.98, 15.26; 24.24) notes the use of storax as a perfume, while Scribonius Largus drank wine flavored with storax. Ciris mentions storax as a fragrant hair dye. Dioscorides (De materia medica 1.79) reports its use as incense, similar to frankincense, having expectorant and soothing properties. Al-Masudi listed storax gum (mayʿa) as a spice in his book Murūdj al-dhahab (Meadows of Gold), published in the 10th century and Chao Ju-Kuan, a trade commissioner in Fukien province, said in the 13th century that liquid storax gum had come from the Arabs.

This species originated in the Southern regions of Mesopotamia, present day Iraq and in particular Babylon. Babylonians used it for respiratory related diseases. 8

In the nineteenth century, styrene by distilling storax balm.

In North Africa, for mystical purposes, women burn benzoin and storax in potsherds.

== Safety ==
Storax resin is "generally regarded as safe" (GRAS) at low levels.
