= Methicillin-resistant Staphylococcus aureus =

Bacterium responsible for difficult-to-treat infections in humans

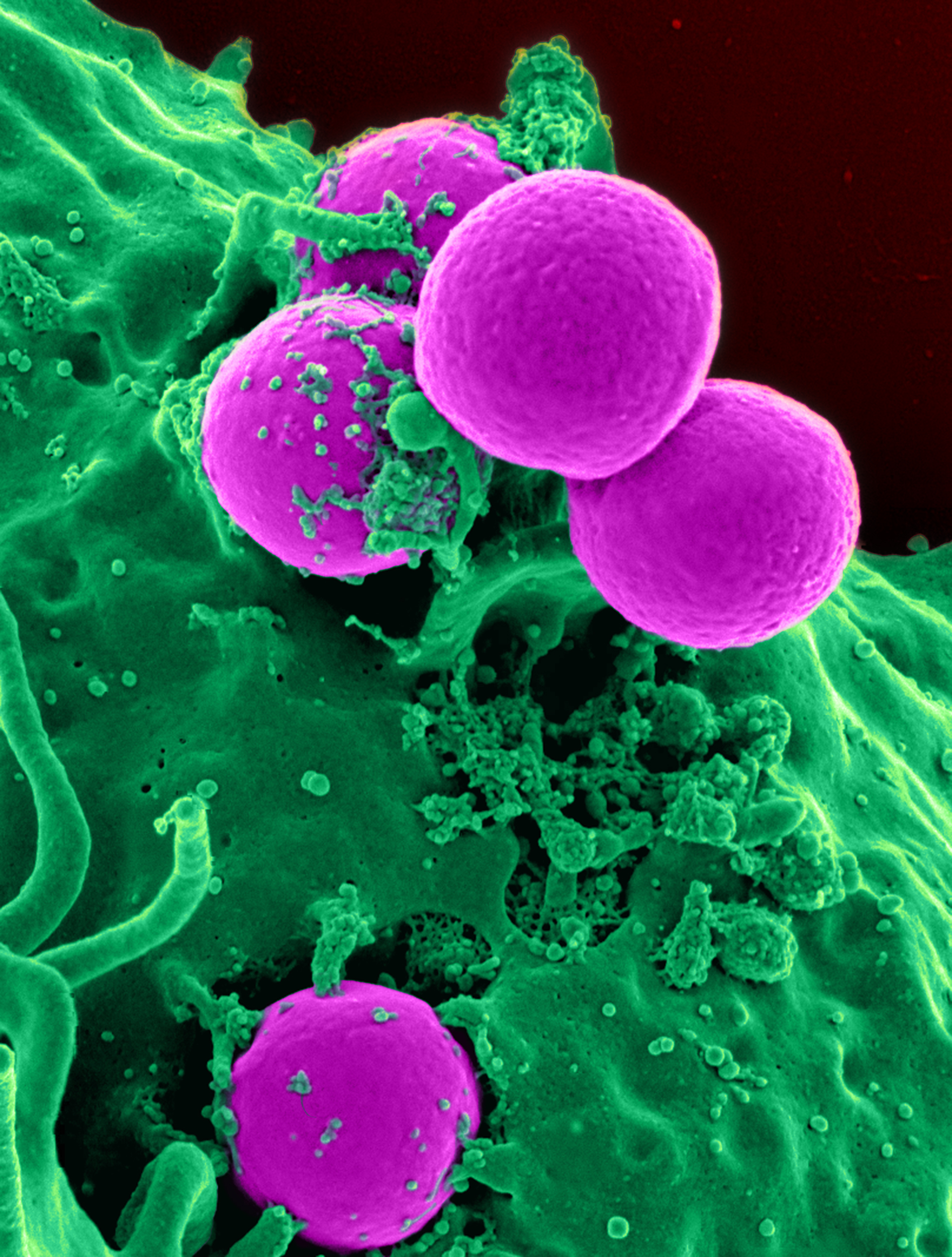
Colorized scanning electron micrograph of a human neutrophil ingesting MRSA

Methicillin-resistant Staphylococcus aureus (MRSA) is a group of Staphylococcus aureus strains that are resistant to β-lactam antibiotics. The β-lactam group is a broad-spectrum group of antibiotics that includes several widely used drugs, including methicillin, oxacillin, and cephalosporins. Therefore, MRSA is responsible for several difficult-to-treat infections in humans. It caused more than 100,000 deaths worldwide attributable to antimicrobial resistance in 2019. Strains unable to resist these antibiotics are classified as methicillin-susceptible S. aureus, or MSSA.

MRSA infection is common in hospitals, prisons, and nursing homes, where people with open wounds, invasive devices such as catheters, and weakened immune systems are at greater risk of healthcare-associated infection. MRSA began as a hospital-acquired infection but has become community-acquired, as well as livestock-acquired. The terms HA-MRSA (healthcare-associated or hospital-acquired MRSA), CA-MRSA (community-associated MRSA), and LA-MRSA (livestock-associated MRSA) reflect this.

== Signs and symptoms ==
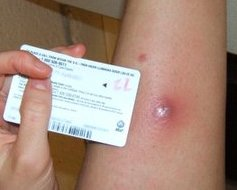
Although usually carried without symptoms, MRSA often presents as small red pustular skin infections

In humans, Staphylococcus aureus is part of the normal microbiota present in the upper respiratory tract, and on skin and in the gut mucosa. However, along with similar bacterial species that can colonize and act symbiotically, they can cause disease if they begin to take over the tissues they have colonized or invade other tissues; the resultant infection has been called a "pathobiont".

After 72 hours, MRSA can take hold in human tissues and eventually become resistant to treatment. The initial presentation of MRSA is small red bumps that resemble pimples, spider bites, or boils; they may be accompanied by fever and, occasionally, rashes. Within a few days, the bumps become larger and more painful; they eventually open into deep, pus-filled boils. About 75 percent of CA-MRSA infections are localized to skin and soft tissue and can be treated effectively.

== Risk factors ==
A select few of the populations at risk include:

- People with indwelling implants, prostheses, drains, and catheters
- People who are frequently in crowded places, especially with shared equipment and skin-to-skin contact
- People with weak immune systems (HIV/AIDS, lupus, or cancer patients; transplant recipients; severe asthmatics; primary immune deficiencies, etc.)
- People with diabetes mellitus
- People who inject intravenous drugs
- Regular contact with someone who has injected drugs in the past year
- People who use fluoroquinolone antibiotics
- Elderly people
- School children sharing sports and other equipment
- College students living in dormitories
- People staying or working in a health-care facility for an extended period
- People who spend time in coastal waters where MRSA is present, such as some beaches in Florida and the West Coast of the United States
- People who spend time in confined spaces with other people, including occupants of homeless shelters, prison inmates, and military recruits in basic training
- Veterinarians, livestock handlers, and pet owners
- People who ingest unpasteurized milk
- People who are immunocompromised and also colonized
- People with chronic obstructive pulmonary disease
- People who have had thoracic surgery

As many as 22% of people colonised with MRSA do not have any discernible risk factors.

=== Hospitalized people ===
People who are hospitalized, including the elderly, are often immunocompromised and susceptible to infection of all kinds, including MRSA; an infection by MRSA is called healthcare-associated or hospital-acquired methicillin-resistant S. aureus (HA-MRSA). Generally, those infected by MRSA stay infected for just under 10 days if treated by a doctor, although effects may vary from person to person.

Both surgical and nonsurgical wounds can be infected with HA-MRSA. Surgical site infections occur on the skin surface, but can spread to internal organs and blood to cause sepsis. Transmission can occur between healthcare providers and patients because some providers may neglect to perform preventative hand-washing between examinations.

People in nursing homes are at risk for all the reasons above, further complicated by their generally weaker immune systems.

=== Prison inmates and military personnel ===
Prisons and military barracks can be crowded and confined, and poor hygiene conditions may proliferate, thus putting inhabitants at increased risk of contracting MRSA. Cases of MRSA in such populations were first reported in the United States and later in Canada. The earliest reports were made by the Centers for Disease Control and Prevention in US state prisons. In the news media, hundreds of reports of MRSA outbreaks in prisons appeared between 2000 and 2008. For example, in February 2008, the Tulsa County jail in Oklahoma started treating an average of 12 S. aureus cases per month.

=== Animals ===
Antibiotic use in livestock increases the risk that MRSA will develop among the livestock and other animals that may reside near them; strains MRSA ST398 and CC398 are transmissible to humans. Generally, animals are asymptomatic.

Domestic pets are susceptible to MRSA infection by transmission from their owners; conversely, MRSA-infected pets can also transmit MRSA to humans.

=== Athletes ===
Locker rooms, gyms, and related athletic facilities offer potential sites for MRSA contamination and infection. Athletes have been identified as a high-risk group. A study linked MRSA to the abrasions caused by artificial turf. Three studies by the Texas State Department of Health found the infection rate among football players was 16 times the national average. In October 2006, a high-school football player was temporarily paralyzed from MRSA-infected turf burns. His infection returned in January 2007 and required three surgeries to remove infected tissue and three weeks of hospital stay.

In 2013, Lawrence Tynes, Carl Nicks, and Johnthan Banks of the Tampa Bay Buccaneers were diagnosed with MRSA. Tynes and Nicks apparently did not contract the infection from each other, but whether Banks contracted it from either individual is unknown. In 2015, Los Angeles Dodgers infielder Justin Turner was infected while the team visited the New York Mets. In October 2015, New York Giants tight end Daniel Fells was hospitalized with a serious MRSA infection.

=== Children ===
MRSA is becoming a critical problem in children; studies found 4.6% of patients in U.S. health-care facilities, (presumably) including hospital nurseries, were infected or colonized with MRSA. Children and adults who come in contact with day-care centers, playgrounds, locker rooms, camps, dormitories, classrooms and other school settings, and gyms and workout facilities are at higher risk of contracting MRSA.

Parents should be especially cautious of children who participate in activities where sports equipment is shared, such as football helmets and uniforms. An outbreak in Ireland in late 2025 resulted from bouncy castles.

=== People who use injection drugs ===
Needle-required drugs have caused an increase of MRSA, with injection drug use (IDU) making up 24.1% (1,839 individuals) of Tennessee Hospital's Discharge System. The unsanitary methods of injection cause an access point for the MRSA to enter the bloodstream and begin infecting the host. Furthermore, with MRSA's high contagion rate, a common risk factor is individuals who are in constant contact with someone who has injected drugs in the past year.

== Mechanism ==
Antimicrobial resistance is genetically based; resistance is mediated by the acquisition of extrachromosomal genetic elements containing genes that confer resistance to certain antibiotics. Examples of such elements include plasmids, transposable genetic elements, and genomic islands, which can be transferred between bacteria through horizontal gene transfer. A defining characteristic of MRSA is its ability to thrive in the presence of penicillin-like antibiotics, which normally prevent bacterial growth by inhibiting the synthesis of cell wall material. This is due to a resistance gene, mecA, which stops β-lactam antibiotics from inactivating the enzymes (transpeptidases) critical for cell wall synthesis.

=== SCCmec ===
Staphylococcal cassette chromosome mec (SCCmec) is a genomic island of unknown origin containing the antibiotic resistance gene mecA. SCCmec contains additional genes beyond mecA, including the cytolysin gene psm-mec, which may suppress virulence in HA-acquired MRSA strains. In addition, this locus encodes strain-dependent gene regulatory RNAs known as psm-mecRNA. SCCmec also contains ccrA and ccrB; both genes encode recombinases that mediate the site-specific integration and excision of the SCCmec element from the S. aureus chromosome. Currently, six unique SCCmec types ranging in size from 21 to 67 kb have been identified; they are designated types I–VI and are distinguished by variation in mec and ccr gene complexes. Owing to the size of the SCCmec element and the constraints of horizontal gene transfer, a minimum of five clones are thought to be responsible for the spread of MRSA infections, with clonal complex (CC) 8 most prevalent. SCCmec is thought to have originated in the closely related Mammaliicoccus sciuri species and transferred horizontally to S. aureus.

Different SCCmec genotypes confer different microbiological characteristics, such as different antimicrobial resistance rates. Different genotypes are also associated with different types of infections. Types I–III SCCmec are large elements that typically contain additional resistance genes and are characteristically isolated from HA-MRSA strains. Conversely, CA-MRSA is associated with types IV and V, which are smaller and lack resistance genes other than mecA.

These distinctions were thoroughly investigated by Collins et al. in 2001 and can be explained by the fitness differences associated with the carriage of a large or small SCCmec plasmid. Carriage of large plasmids, such as SCCmecI–III, is costly to the bacteria, resulting in a compensatory decrease in virulence expression. MRSA can thrive in hospital settings with increased antibiotic resistance but decreased virulence – HA-MRSA targets immunocompromised, hospitalized hosts, thus a decrease in virulence is not maladaptive. In contrast, CA-MRSA tends to carry lower-fitness cost SCCmec elements to offset the increased virulence and toxicity expression required to infect healthy hosts.

=== mecA ===
mecA is a biomarker gene responsible for resistance to methicillin and other β-lactam antibiotics. After the acquisition of mecA, the gene must be integrated and localized in the S. aureus chromosome. mecA encodes penicillin-binding protein 2a (PBP2a), which differs from other penicillin-binding proteins as its active site does not bind methicillin or other β-lactam antibiotics. As such, PBP2a can continue to catalyze the transpeptidation reaction required for peptidoglycan cross-linking, enabling cell wall synthesis even in the presence of antibiotics. As a consequence of the inability of PBP2a to interact with β-lactam moieties, acquisition of mecA confers resistance to almost all β-lactam antibiotics in addition to methicillin.

mecA is under the control of two regulatory genes, mecI and mecR1. MecI is usually bound to the mecA promoter and functions as a repressor. In the presence of a β-lactam antibiotic, MecR1 initiates a signal transduction cascade that leads to transcriptional activation of mecA. This is achieved by MecR1-mediated cleavage of MecI, which alleviates MecI repression. mecA is further controlled by two co-repressors, blaI and blaR1. blaI and blaR1 are homologous to mecI and mecR1, respectively, and normally function as regulators of blaZ, which is responsible for penicillin resistance. The DNA sequences bound by mecI and blaI are identical; therefore, blaI can also bind the mecA operator to repress transcription of mecA.

=== Arginine catabolic mobile element ===
The arginine catabolic mobile element (ACME) is a virulence factor present in many MRSA strains but not prevalent in MSSA. SpeG-positive ACME compensates for the polyamine hypersensitivity of S. aureus and facilitates stable skin colonization, wound infection, and person-to-person transmission.

=== Strains ===
Diagram depicting antibiotic resistance through alteration of the antibiotic's target site, modeled after MRSA's resistance to penicillin. Beta-lactam antibiotics permanently inactivate PBP enzymes, which are essential for cell wall synthesis and thus for bacterial life, by permanently binding to their active sites. Some forms of MRSA, however, express a different PBP that will not allow the antibiotic into its active site.

Acquisition of SCCmec in methicillin-sensitive S. aureus (MSSA) gives rise to several genetically different MRSA lineages. These genetic variations within different MRSA strains possibly explain the variability in virulence and associated MRSA infections. The first MRSA strain, ST250 MRSA-1, originated from SCCmec and ST250-MSSA integration. Historically, major MRSA clones ST2470-MRSA-I, ST239-MRSA-III, ST5-MRSA-II, and ST5-MRSA-IV were responsible for causing hospital-acquired MRSA (HA-MRSA) infections. ST239-MRSA-III, known as the Brazilian clone, was highly transmissible compared to others and distributed in Argentina, the Czech Republic, and Portugal.

In the UK, the most common strains of MRSA are EMRSA15 and EMRSA16. EMRSA16 is identical to the ST36:USA200 strain, which circulates in the United States, and to carry the SCCmec type II, enterotoxin A and toxic shock syndrome toxin 1 genes. Under the new international typing system, this strain is now called MRSA252. EMRSA 15 is also found to be one of the common MRSA strains in Asia. Other common strains include ST5:USA100 and EMRSA 1. These strains are genetic characteristics of HA-MRSA.

Community-acquired MRSA (CA-MRSA) strains emerged in the late 1990s to 2000, infecting healthy people who had not been in contact with healthcare facilities. Researchers suggest that CA-MRSA did not evolve from HA-MRSA. This is further proven by molecular typing of CA-MRSA strains and genome comparison between CA-MRSA and HA-MRSA, which indicate that novel MRSA strains integrated SCCmec into MSSA separately on its own. By mid-2000, CA-MRSA was introduced into healthcare systems and distinguishing CA-MRSA from HA-MRSA became a difficult process. Community-acquired MRSA is more easily treated and more virulent than hospital-acquired MRSA (HA-MRSA). The genetic mechanism for the enhanced virulence in CA-MRSA remains an active area of research. The Panton–Valentine leukocidin (PVL) genes are associated with many CA-MRSA lineages, but are not universal and are also found in some methicillin-susceptible S. aureus strains.

In the United States, most cases of CA-MRSA are caused by a CC8 strain designated ST8:USA300, which carries SCCmec type IV, Panton–Valentine leukocidin, PSM-alpha and enterotoxins Q and K, and ST1:USA400. The ST8:USA300 strain results in skin infections, necrotizing fasciitis, and toxic shock syndrome, whereas the ST1:USA400 strain results in necrotizing pneumonia and pulmonary sepsis. Other community-acquired strains of MRSA are ST8:USA500 and ST59:USA1000. In many nations worldwide, MRSA strains with different genetic background types have come to predominate among CA-MRSA strains; USA300 easily tops the list in the U.S. and is becoming more common in Canada after its first appearance there in 2004. For example, in Australia, ST93 strains are common, while in continental Europe ST80 strains, which carry SCCmec type IV, predominate. In Taiwan, ST59 strains, some of which are resistant to many non-beta-lactam antibiotics, have arisen as common causes of skin and soft tissue infections in the community. In a remote region of Alaska, unlike most of the continental U.S., USA300 was found only rarely in a study of MRSA strains from outbreaks in 1996 and 2000, as well as in surveillance from 2004 to 2006.

In New Zealand, national surveillance documented the rapid emergence of a PVL-negative ST5-SCCmec-IV clone with spa type t002. Its proportion among clinical MRSA isolates in the annual surveys increased from 0.3% in 2005 to 34.7% in 2011, displacing the PVL-positive ST30-IV Southwest Pacific clone as the predominant community-associated MRSA lineage. This lineage, informally known as AK3, was subsequently shown by comparative genomics to form a genetically distinct ST5 clade that likely emerged from locally circulating ST5 methicillin-susceptible S. aureus and acquired a chimeric SCCmecIV-SCC476 element carrying fusC, which confers fusidic acid resistance. A 2025 phylogenomic study of 397 related genomes estimated an MSSA ancestor in New Zealand in the late 1970s, followed by sequential acquisition of mobile genetic elements and diversification of AK3 into three major clades. Most sampled AK3 genomes were from New Zealand and Australia, with sporadic detections in Europe and Samoa.

A MRSA strain, CC398, is found in intensively reared production animals (primarily pigs, but also cattle and poultry), where it can be transmitted to humans as LA-MRSA (livestock-associated MRSA).

== Diagnosis ==
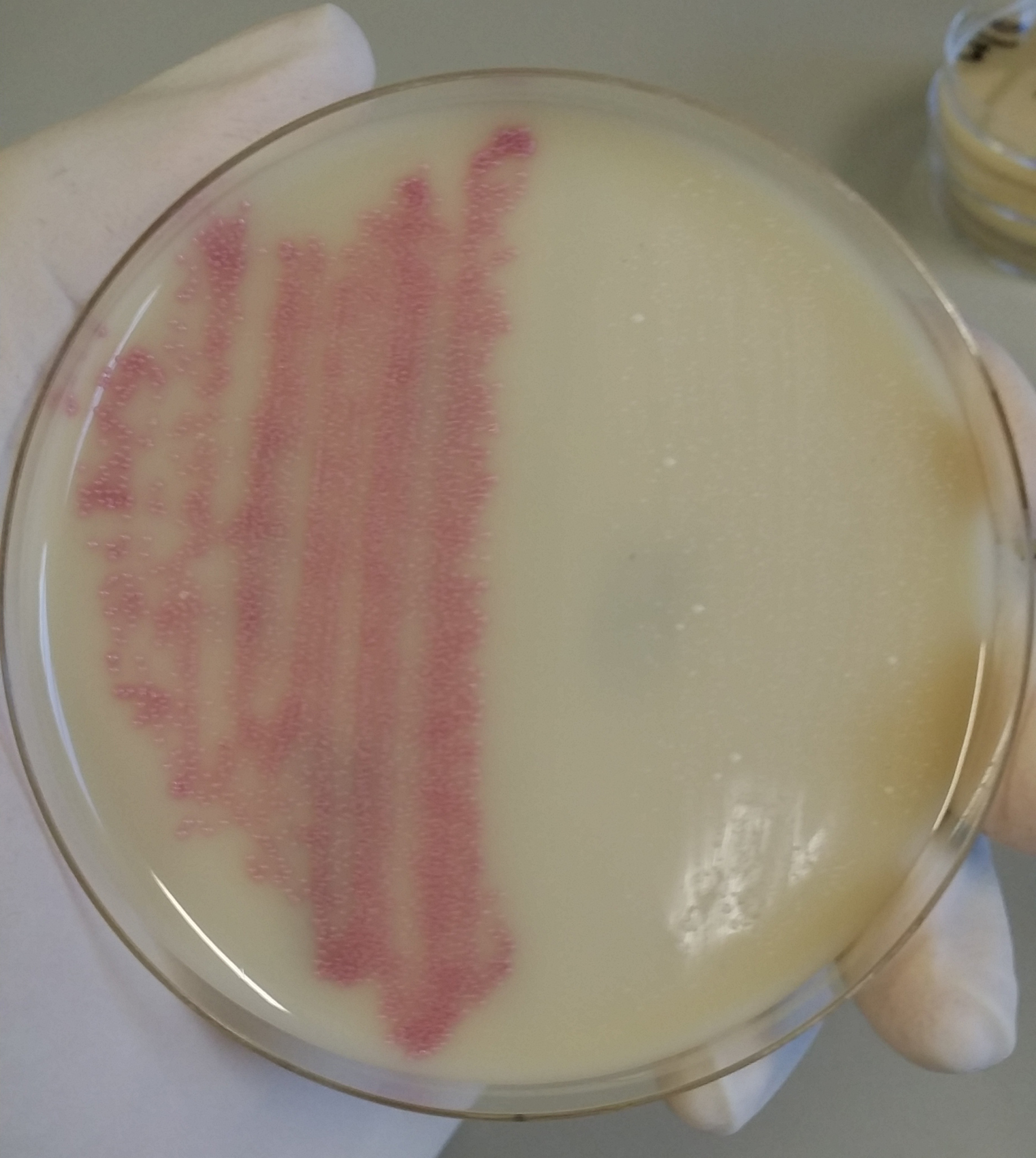
A selective and differential chromogenic medium for the qualitative direct detection of MRSA

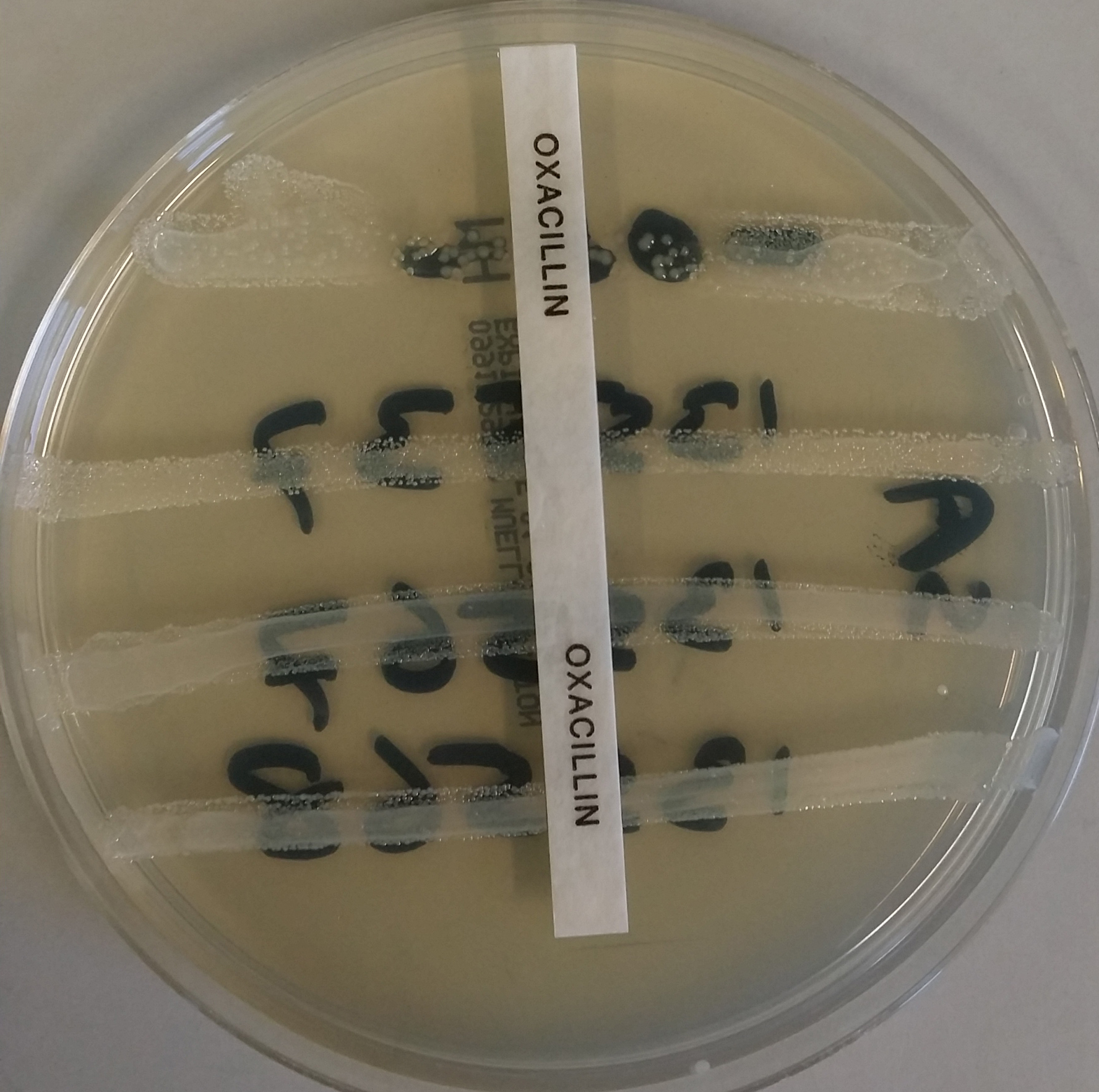
MRSA resistance to oxacillin being tested. The top S. aureus isolate is a control that is not resistant to oxacillin; the other three isolates are MRSA-positive.

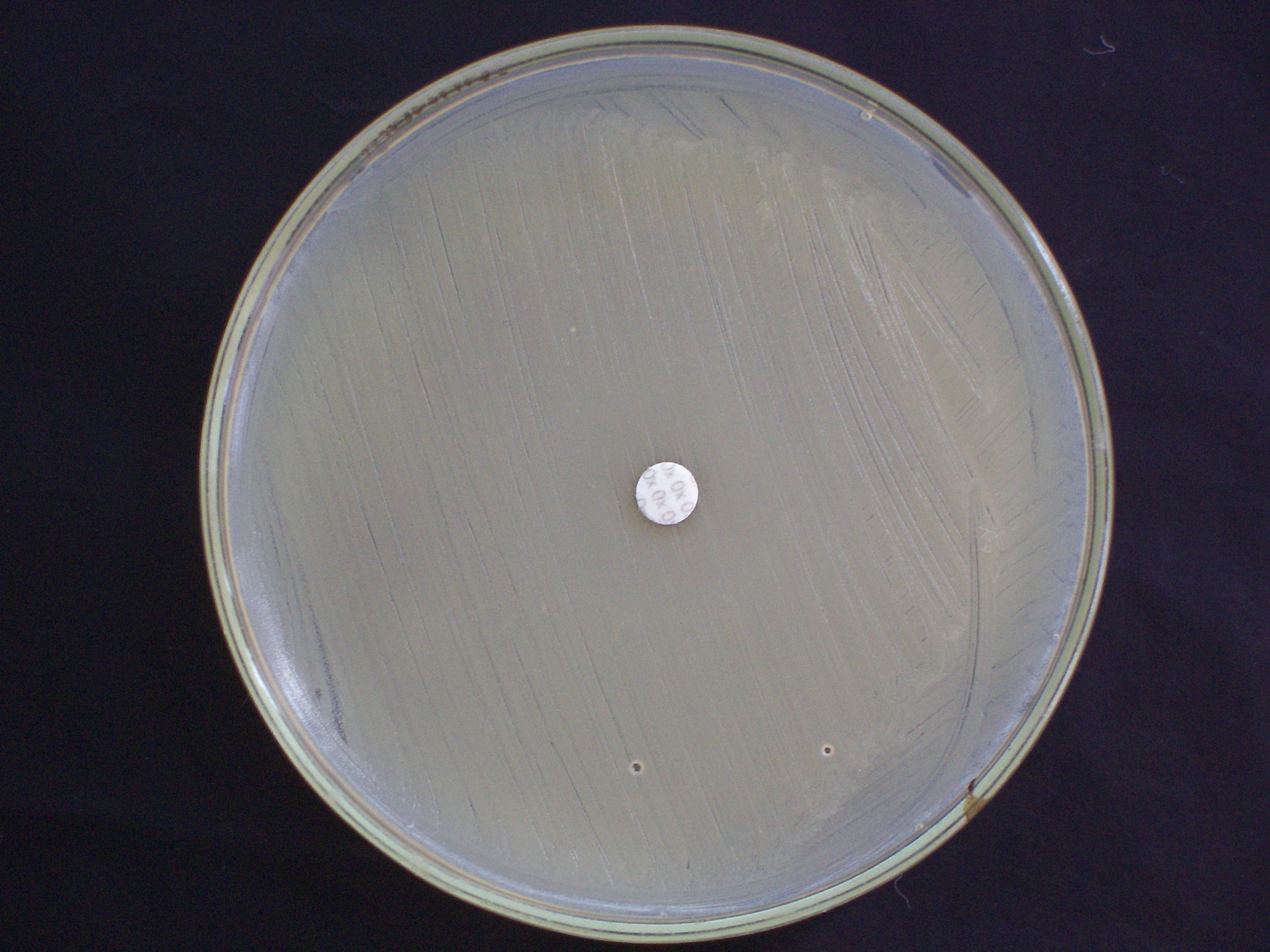
Mueller–Hinton agar showing MRSA resistant to an oxacillin disk

Diagnostic microbiology laboratories and reference laboratories are key to identifying MRSA outbreaks. Normally, a bacterium must be cultured from blood, urine, sputum, or other body-fluid samples, and in sufficient quantities to perform confirmatory tests early on. Still, because no quick and easy method exists to diagnose MRSA, initial treatment of the infection is often based on "strong suspicion" and techniques by the treating physician; these include quantitative PCR procedures, which are employed in clinical laboratories to detect and identify MRSA strains quickly.

Another common laboratory test is a rapid latex agglutination test that detects the PBP2a protein. PBP2a is a variant penicillin-binding protein that imparts the ability of S. aureus to be resistant to oxacillin.

=== Microbiology ===
Like all S. aureus (also abbreviated SA at times), methicillin-resistant S. aureus is a gram-positive, spherical (coccus) bacterium about 1 micron in diameter. It does not form spores, and it is not motile. It is frequently found in grape-like clusters or chains. Unlike methicillin-susceptible S. aureus (MSSA), MRSA is slow-growing on a variety of media and has been found to exist in mixed colonies of MSSA. The mecA gene, which confers resistance to several antibiotics, is always present in MRSA and usually absent in MSSA; however, in some instances, the mecA gene is present in MSSA but is not expressed. Polymerase chain reaction (PCR) testing is the most precise method for identifying MRSA strains. Specialized culture media have been developed to better differentiate between MSSA and MRSA, and, in some cases, such media can be used to identify specific strains resistant to different antibiotics.

Other strains of S. aureus have emerged that are resistant to oxacillin, clindamycin, teicoplanin, and erythromycin. These resistant strains may or may not possess the mecA gene. S. aureus has also developed resistance to vancomycin (VRSA). One strain is only partially susceptible to vancomycin and is called vancomycin-intermediate S. aureus (VISA). GISA, a strain of resistant S. aureus, is a glycopeptide-intermediate S. aureus and is less susceptible to vancomycin and teicoplanin. Resistance to antibiotics in S. aureus can be quantified by determining the amount of the antibiotic that must be used to inhibit growth. If S. aureus is inhibited at a concentration of vancomycin less than or equal to 4 μg/ml, it is said to be susceptible. If a concentration greater than 32 μg/ml is necessary to inhibit growth, it is said to be resistant.

== Prevention ==
=== Screening ===
In health-care settings, isolating those with MRSA from those without the infection is one method to prevent transmission. Rapid culture and sensitivity testing and molecular testing identify carriers and reduce infection rates. It is especially important to test patients in these settings since 2% of people are carriers of MRSA, even though in many of these cases the bacteria reside in the nostril and the patient will not present any symptoms.

MRSA can be identified by swabbing the nostrils and isolating the bacteria. Combined with extra sanitary measures for those in contact with infected people, swab screening people admitted to hospitals is effective in minimizing the spread of MRSA in hospitals in the United States, Denmark, Finland, and the Netherlands.

=== Handwashing ===
The Centers for Disease Control and Prevention offers suggestions for preventing the contraction and spread of MRSA infection, which apply to those in community settings, including incarcerated populations, childcare center employees, and athletes. To prevent the spread of MRSA, the recommendations are to wash hands thoroughly and regularly using soap and water or an alcohol-based sanitizer. Additional recommendations are to keep wounds clean and covered, avoid contact with other people's wounds, avoid sharing personal items such as razors or towels, shower after exercising at athletic facilities, and shower before using swimming pools or whirlpools.

=== Isolation ===
Excluding medical facilities, current US guidance does not require workers with MRSA infections to be routinely excluded from the general workplace. The National Institutes of Health recommend that those with wound drainage that cannot be covered and contained with a clean, dry bandage and those who cannot maintain good hygiene practices be reassigned, and patients with wound drainage should also automatically be put on "Contact Precaution," regardless of whether or not they have a known infection. Workers with active infections are excluded from activities where skin-to-skin contact is likely to occur. To prevent the spread of staphylococci or MRSA in the workplace, employers are encouraged to make available adequate facilities that support good hygiene. In addition, surface and equipment sanitizing should conform to Environmental Protection Agency-registered disinfectants. In hospital settings, contact isolation can be discontinued after one to three negative cultures. Before the patient is cleared from isolation, it is advised that there is dedicated patient-care or single-use equipment for that particular patient. If this is not possible, the equipment must be properly disinfected before it is used on another patient.

To prevent the spread of MRSA in the home, health departments recommend laundering materials that have come into contact with infected persons separately and with a dilute bleach solution; to reduce the bacterial load in one's nose and skin; and to clean and disinfect those things in the house that people regularly touch, such as sinks, tubs, kitchen counters, cell phones, light switches, doorknobs, phones, toilets, and computer keyboards.

=== Restricting antibiotic use ===
Glycopeptides, cephalosporins, and in particular, fluoroquinolones are associated with an increased risk of colonisation of MRSA. Reducing the use of antibiotic classes that promote MRSA colonisation, especially fluoroquinolones, is recommended in current guidelines.

=== Public health considerations ===
Mathematical models describe one way in which a loss of infection control can occur after measures for screening and isolation seem to be effective for years, as happened in the UK. In the "search and destroy" strategy that all UK hospitals employed until the mid-1990s, all hospitalized people with MRSA were immediately isolated, and all staff were screened for MRSA and were prevented from working until they had completed a course of eradication therapy that was proven to work. Loss of control occurs because colonised people are discharged back into the community and then readmitted; when the number of colonised people in the community reaches a certain threshold, the "search and destroy" strategy is overwhelmed. One of the few countries not to have been overwhelmed by MRSA is the Netherlands: an important part of the success of the Dutch strategy may have been to attempt eradication of carriage upon discharge from hospital.

=== Decolonization ===
As of 2013, no randomized clinical trials had been conducted to understand how to treat nonsurgical wounds that had been colonized, but not infected, with MRSA, and insufficient studies had been conducted to understand how to treat surgical wounds that had been colonized with MRSA. As of 2013, whether strategies to eradicate MRSA colonization of people in nursing homes reduced infection rates was not known.

Care should be taken when trying to drain boils, as disruption of surrounding tissue can lead to larger infections, including sepsis and bacterial infections of the bloodstream. Mupirocin 2% ointment can be effective at reducing the size of lesions. A secondary covering of clothing is preferred. As shown in an animal study with diabetic mice, the topical application of a mixture of sugar (70%) and 3% povidone-iodine paste is an effective agent for the treatment of diabetic ulcers with MRSA infection.

=== Agriculture ===
The World Health Organization advocates regulations on the use of antibiotics in animal feed to prevent the emergence of drug-resistant strains of MRSA. MRSA is established in animals and birds.

== Treatment ==
=== Antibiotics ===
Treatment of MRSA infection is urgent, and delays can be fatal. The location and history related to the infection determine the treatment. The route of administration of an antibiotic varies. Antibiotics effective against MRSA can be given by IV, oral, or a combination of both, and depend on the specific circumstances and patient characteristics. Concurrent treatment with vancomycin or other beta-lactam agents may have a synergistic effect.

Both CA-MRSA and HA-MRSA are resistant to traditional anti-staphylococcal beta-lactam antibiotics, such as cephalexin. CA-MRSA has a greater spectrum of antimicrobial susceptibility to sulfa drugs (like co-trimoxazole (trimethoprim/sulfamethoxazole), tetracyclines (like doxycycline and minocycline) and clindamycin (for osteomyelitis). MRSA can be eradicated with a regimen of linezolid, though treatment protocols vary and serum levels of antibiotics vary widely from person to person and may affect outcomes. The effective treatment of MRSA with linezolid has been successful in 87% of people. Linezolid is more effective in soft tissue infections than vancomycin. This is compared to the eradication of infection in those with MRSA treated with vancomycin. Treatment with vancomycin is successful in approximately 49% of people. Linezolid belongs to the newer oxazolidinone class of antibiotics, which is effective against both CA-MRSA and HA-MRSA. The Infectious Disease Society of America recommends vancomycin, linezolid, or clindamycin (if susceptible) for treating those with MRSA pneumonia. Ceftaroline, a fifth-generation cephalosporin, is the first beta-lactam antibiotic approved in the US to treat MRSA infections in skin and soft tissue or community-acquired pneumonia.

Vancomycin and teicoplanin are glycopeptide antibiotics used to treat MRSA infections. Teicoplanin is a structural congener of vancomycin that has a similar activity spectrum but a longer half-life. Because the oral absorption of vancomycin and teicoplanin is very low, these agents can be administered intravenously to control systemic infections. Treatment of MRSA infection with vancomycin can be complicated, due to its inconvenient route of administration. Moreover, the efficacy of vancomycin against MRSA is inferior to that of anti-staphylococcal beta-lactam antibiotics against methicillin-susceptible S. aureus (MSSA).

Several newly discovered MRSA strains show antibiotic resistance even to vancomycin and teicoplanin. Strains with intermediate (4–8 μg/ml) levels of resistance, termed glycopeptide-intermediate S. aureus (GISA) or vancomycin-intermediate S. aureus (VISA), began appearing in the late 1990s. The first identified case was in Japan in 1996, and strains have since been found in hospitals in England, France, and the US. The first documented strain with complete (>16 μg/ml) resistance to vancomycin, termed vancomycin-resistant S. aureus (VRSA), appeared in the United States in 2002. In 2011, a variant of vancomycin was tested that binds to the lactate variation and also binds well to the original target, thus reinstating potent antimicrobial activity. Linezolid, quinupristin/dalfopristin, daptomycin, ceftaroline, and tigecycline are used to treat more severe infections that do not respond to glycopeptides such as vancomycin. Current guidelines recommend daptomycin for VISA bloodstream infections and endocarditis.

Oxazolidinones such as linezolid became available in the 1990s and are comparable to vancomycin in effectiveness against MRSA. Linezolid resistance in S. aureus was reported in 2001, but infection rates have been at consistently low levels. In the United Kingdom and Ireland, no linezolid resistance was found in staphylococci collected from bacteremia cases between 2001 and 2006.

=== Skin and soft-tissue infections ===
In skin abscesses, the primary treatment recommended is removal of dead tissue, incision, and drainage. More information is needed to determine the effectiveness of specific antibiotics therapy in surgical site infections (SSIs). Examples of soft-tissue infections from MRSA include ulcers, impetigo, abscesses, and SSIs. In surgical wounds, evidence is weak (high risk of bias) that linezolid may be better than vancomycin to eradicate MRSA SSIs.

MRSA colonization is also found in nonsurgical wounds such as traumatic wounds, burns, and chronic ulcers (i.e.: diabetic ulcer, pressure ulcer, arterial insufficiency ulcer, venous ulcer). No conclusive evidence has been found about the best antibiotic regimen to treat MRSA colonization.

=== Children ===
In skin infections and secondary infection sites, topical mupirocin is used successfully. For bacteremia and endocarditis, vancomycin or daptomycin is considered. For children with MRSA-infected bone or joints, treatment is individualized and long-term. Neonates can develop neonatal pustulosis as a result of topical infection with MRSA. Clindamycin is not approved for the treatment of MRSA infection. It is still used in children for soft-tissue infections.

=== Endocarditis and bacteremia ===
Evaluation for the replacement of a prosthetic valve is considered. Appropriate antibiotic therapy may be administered for up to six weeks. Four to six weeks of antibiotic treatment is often recommended, and is dependent upon the extent of MRSA infection.

=== Respiratory infections ===
CA-MRSA in hospitalized patients pneumonia treatment begins before culture results. After antibiotic susceptibility is performed, the infection may be treated with vancomycin or linezolid for up to 21 days. If the pneumonia is complicated by the accumulation of pus in the pleural cavity surrounding the lungs, drainage may be done along with antibiotic therapy. People with cystic fibrosis may develop respiratory complications related to MRSA infection. The incidence of MRSA in those with cystic fibrosis increased from 2000 to 2015 by five times. Most of these infections were HA-MRSA. MRSA accounts for 26% of lung infections in those with cystic fibrosis.

There is insufficient evidence to support the use of topical or systemic antibiotics for nasal or extra-nasal MRSA infection.

=== Bone and joint infections ===
Cleaning the wound of dead tissue and draining abscesses is the first action to treat the MRSA infection. Administration of antibiotics is not standardized and is adapted on a case-by-case basis. Antibiotic therapy can last up to 3 months and sometimes even longer.

=== Infected implants ===
MRSA infection can occur in association with implants and joint replacements. Recommendations on treatment are based upon the length of time the implant has been in place. In cases of a recent placement of a surgical implant or artificial joint, the device may be retained while antibiotic therapy continues. If the placement of the device occurred over 3 weeks ago, the device may be removed. Antibiotic therapy is used in each instance, sometimes long-term.

=== Central nervous system ===
MRSA can infect the central nervous system and form a brain abscess, subdural empyema, and spinal epidural abscess. Excision and drainage can be done along with antibiotic treatment. Septic thrombosis of cavernous or dural venous sinus can sometimes be a complication.

=== Other infections ===
Treatment is not standardized for other instances of MRSA infection in a wide range of tissues. Treatment varies for MRSA infections related to: subperiosteal abscesses, necrotizing pneumonia, cellulitis, pyomyositis, necrotizing fasciitis, mediastinitis, myocardial, perinephric, hepatic, and splenic abscesses, septic thrombophlebitis, and severe ocular infections, including endophthalmitis. Pets can be reservoirs and pass on MRSA to people. In some cases, the infection can be symptomatic, and the pet can develop an MRSA infection. Health departments recommend that the pet be taken to the veterinarian if MRSA infections keep occurring in the people who have contact with the pet.

== Epidemiology ==
Share of s aureus bloodstream infections that are resistant to antibiotics

Worldwide, an estimated 2 billion people carry some form of S. aureus; of these, up to 53 million (2.7% of carriers) are thought to carry MRSA. S. aureus was identified as one of the six leading pathogens for deaths associated with resistance in 2019 and 100,000 deaths caused by MRSA were attributable to antimicrobial resistance.

=== HA-MRSA (healthcare-associated) ===
In a US cohort study of 1,300 healthy children, 2.4% carried MRSA in their nose. Bacterial sepsis occurs with most (75%) of cases of invasive MRSA infection. In 2009, there were an estimated 463,017 hospitalizations due to MRSA, or a rate of 11.74 per 1,000 hospitalizations. Many of these infections are less serious, but the Centers for Disease Control and Prevention (CDC) estimate that there are 80,461 invasive MRSA infections and 11,285 deaths due to MRSA annually. In 2003, the cost for a hospitalization due to MRSA infection was US$92,363; a hospital stay for MSSA was $52,791.

Infection after surgery is relatively uncommon, but occurs in as much as 33% in specific types of surgeries. Infections of surgical sites range from 1% to 33%. MRSA sepsis that occurs within 30 days following a surgical infection has a 15–38% mortality rate; MRSA sepsis that occurs within one year has a mortality rate of around 55%. There may be increased mortality associated with cardiac surgery. There is a rate of 12.9% in those infected with MRSA, while only 3% infected with other organisms. SSIs infected with MRSA had longer hospital stays than those who did not.

Globally, MRSA infection rates vary year to year. According to the 2006 SENTRY Antimicrobial Surveillance Program report, the incidence of MRSA bloodstream infections was 35.9% in North America. MRSA blood infections in Latin America were 29%. European incidence was 22.8%. The rate of all MRSA infections in Europe ranged from 50% in Portugal down to 0.8% in Sweden. Overall, MRSA infection rates varied in Latin America: Colombia and Venezuela combined had 3%, Mexico had 50%, Chile 38%, Brazil 29%, and Argentina 28%.

The Centers for Disease Control and Prevention (CDC) estimated that about 1.7 million nosocomial infections occurred in the United States in 2002, with 99,000 associated deaths. The estimated incidence is 4.5 nosocomial infections per 100 admissions, with direct costs (at 2004 prices) ranging from $10,500 (£5300, €8000 at 2006 rates) per case (for bloodstream, urinary tract, or respiratory infections in immunocompetent people) to $111,000 (£57,000, €85,000) per case for antibiotic-resistant infections in the bloodstream in people with transplants. With these numbers, conservative estimates of the total direct costs of nosocomial infections are above $17 billion. The reduction of such infections forms an important component of efforts to improve healthcare safety. (BMJ 2007) MRSA alone was associated with 8% of nosocomial infections reported to the CDC National Healthcare Safety Network from January 2006 to October 2007.

The British National Audit Office estimated that the incidence of nosocomial infections in Europe ranges from 4% to 10% of all hospital admissions. As of early 2005, the number of deaths in the United Kingdom attributed to MRSA has been estimated by various sources to lie in the range of 3,000 per year.

In the United States, an estimated 95 million people carry S. aureus in their noses; of these, 2.5 million (2.6% of carriers) carry MRSA. A population review conducted in three U.S. communities showed the annual incidence of CA-MRSA during 2001–2002 to be 18–25.7/100,000; most CA-MRSA isolates were associated with clinically relevant infections, and 23% of people required hospitalization.

=== CA-MRSA (community-associated) ===
In a US cohort study of 1,300 healthy children, 2.4% carried MRSA in their noses. There are concerns that the presence of MRSA in the environment may allow resistance to be transferred to other bacteria through phages (viruses that infect bacteria). The source of MRSA could come from hospital waste, farm sewage, or other wastewater. MRSA is also common in infections of dogs and cats, and transmission to humans can occur, since pet owners hug and kiss their pets or let them sleep in their beds. While sharing of isolates can occur, infections in humans seem to originate from HA-MRSA rather than from pet-acquired CA-MRSA.

=== LA-MRSA (livestock-associated) ===
In 2004, MRSA was first isolated on a Dutch pig farm leading to further investigations of livestock associated MRSA (LA-MRSA). Livestock associated MRSA (LA-MRSA) has been observed in Korea, Brazil, Switzerland, Malaysia, India, Great Britain, Denmark, and China.

== History ==
Incidence of MRSA in human blood samples in countries which took part in the study in 2017

In 1961, the first known MRSA isolates were reported in a British study, and from 1961 to 1967, infrequent hospital outbreaks occurred in Western Europe and Australia, with methicillin then being licensed in England to treat resistant infections. Other reports of MRSA began to be described in the 1970s. Resistance to other antibiotics was documented in some strains of S. aureus. In 1996, vancomycin resistance was reported in Japan. In many countries, outbreaks of MRSA infection were reported to be transmitted between hospitals. The rate had increased to 22% by 1995, and by 1997 the level of hospital S. aureus infections attributable to MRSA had reached 50%.

The first reports of community-associated MRSA (CA-MRSA) occurred in 1981 and 1982, a large outbreak of CA-MRSA occurred among intravenous drug users in Detroit, Michigan. Additional outbreaks of CA-MRSA were reported through the 1980s and 1990s, including outbreaks among Australian Aboriginal populations that had never been exposed to hospitals. In the mid-1990s, scattered reports of CA-MRSA outbreaks among US children were made. While HA-MRSA rates stabilized between 1998 and 2008, CA-MRSA rates continued to rise. A report released by the University of Chicago Children's Hospital comparing two periods (1993–1995 and 1995–1997) found a 25-fold increase in the rate of hospitalizations due to MRSA among children in the United States. In 1999, the University of Chicago reported the first deaths from invasive MRSA among otherwise healthy children in the United States. By 2004, the genome for various strains of MRSA were described.

The observed increased mortality among MRSA-infected people arguably may be the result of the increased underlying morbidity of these people. Several studies, however, including one by Blot and colleagues, that have adjusted for underlying disease still found MRSA bacteremia to have a higher attributable mortality than methicillin-susceptible S. aureus (MSSA) bacteremia.

A population-based study of MRSA infection incidence in San Francisco during 2004–05 demonstrated that nearly one in 300 residents had such an infection in a year and that more than 85% of these infections occurred outside the healthcare setting. A 2004 study showed that people in the United States with S. aureus infection had, on average, three times the length of hospital stay (14.3 vs. 4.5 days), incurred three times the total cost ($48,824 vs. $14,141), and experienced five times the risk of in-hospital death (11.2% vs 2.3%) than people without this infection. In a meta-analysis of 31 studies, Cosgrove et al., concluded that MRSA bacteremia is associated with increased mortality as compared with MSSA bacteremia (odds ratio= 1.93; 95% CI = 1.93 ± 0.39). In addition, Wyllie et al. report a death rate of 34% within 30 days among people infected with MRSA, a rate similar to the death rate of 27% seen among MSSA-infected people.

In the US, the CDC issued guidelines on October 19, 2006, citing the need for additional research, but declined to recommend such screening. According to the CDC, the most recent estimates of the incidence of healthcare-associated infections that are attributable to MRSA in the United States indicate a decline in such infection rates. Incidence of MRSA central line-associated bloodstream infections as reported by hundreds of intensive care units decreased 50–70% from 2001 to 2007. A separate system tracking all hospital MRSA bloodstream infections found an overall 34% decrease between 2005 and 2008. In 2010, vancomycin was the drug of choice.

Across Europe, based mostly on data from 2013, seven countries (Iceland, Norway, Sweden, the Netherlands, Denmark, Finland, and Estonia, from lowest to highest) had low levels of hospital-acquired MRSA infections compared to the others, and among countries with higher levels, significant improvements had been made only in Bulgaria, Poland, and the British Isles.

A 1,000-year-old eye salve recipe found in the medieval Bald's Leechbook at the British Library, one of the earliest known medical textbooks, was found to have activity against MRSA in vitro and in skin wounds in mice.

== In the media ==
MRSA is frequently a media topic, especially if well-known personalities have announced that they have or have had the infection. Word of outbreaks of infection appears regularly in newspapers and television news programs. A report on skin and soft-tissue infections in the Cook County jail in Chicago in 2004–05 demonstrated MRSA was the most common cause of these infections among those incarcerated there. Lawsuits filed against those who are accused of infecting others with MRSA are also popular stories in the media.

MRSA is the topic of radio programs, television shows, books, and movies.

== Research ==
Various antibacterial chemical extracts from various species of the sweetgum tree (genus Liquidambar) have been investigated for their activity in inhibiting MRSA. Specifically, these are: cinnamic acid, cinnamyl cinnamate, ethyl cinnamate, benzyl cinnamate, styrene, vanillin, cinnamyl alcohol, 2-phenylpropyl alcohol, and 3-phenylpropyl cinnamate.

The delivery of inhaled antibiotics along with systemic administration to treat MRSA is being developed. This may improve the outcomes of those with cystic fibrosis and other respiratory infections. Bacteriophage preparations active against S. aureus, including MRSA, have long been used clinically in Georgia, Poland and Ukraine, although mostly on the basis of uncontrolled case series. In Western countries, early-phase clinical trials and compassionate-use programmes have reported acceptable safety, and the first small randomized trials have reported encouraging results, but as of 2026 phage therapy is not an approved treatment. Host-directed therapeutics, including host kinase inhibitors, as well as antimicrobial peptides are under study as adjunctive or alternative treatment for MRSA.

A 2015 Cochrane systematic review aimed to assess the effectiveness of wearing gloves, gowns, and masks to help stop the spread of MRSA in hospitals; however, no eligible studies were identified for inclusion. The review authors concluded that there is a need for randomized controlled trials to be conducted to help determine if the use of gloves, gowns, and masks reduces the transmission of MRSA in hospitals.

== See also ==
- MRSA ST398
