= C12H14O2 =

The molecular formula C_{12}H_{14}O_{2} (molar mass: 190.24 g/mol) may refer to:

- Butylphthalide (3-n-butylphthalide or NBP)
- Ligustilide
- Propyl cinnamate
