= CC398 =

MRSA bacterial variant

CC398 or MRSA CC398 is a new variant of MRSA that has emerged in animals and is found in intensively reared production animals (primarily pigs, but also cattle and poultry), where it can be transmitted to humans as LA-MRSA (livestock-associated MRSA). A 2009 study shows, however, that dissemination of CC398 from exposed humans to other, non-exposed humans is infrequent. Though dangerous to humans, CC398 is often asymptomatic in food-producing animals. In a single study conducted in Denmark, MRSA was shown to originate in livestock and spread to humans, though the MRSA strain may have originated in humans and was transmitted to livestock.

A 2011 study reported 47% of the meat and poultry sold in surveyed U.S. grocery stores was contaminated with S. aureus, and of those 5–24.4% of the total were resistant to at least three classes of antibiotics. "Now we need to determine what this means in terms of risk to the consumer," said Dr. Keim, a co-author of the paper. Some samples of commercially sold meat products in Japan were also found to harbor MRSA strains.

An investigation of 100 pig-meat samples purchased from major UK retailers conducted by the Guardian in 2015 showed that some 10% of the samples were contaminated.

In 2017 17 out of 401 examined horses in Denmark were found to carry MRSA, typically strains of CC398. The same year it was reported that from 2014–2016 44 persons in Denmark were infected with LA-MRSA from fur farming mink and that LA-MRSA was found in 88% of Danish pig herds.

== See also ==
- Carbapenem resistant enterobacteriaceae
- Necrotizing fasciitis
- Staphylococcus aureus
- Toxic shock syndrome
- XF-73
- Teixobactin
