= SCCmec =

Staphylococcus mobile genetic element

SCCmec, or staphylococcal cassette chromosome mec, is a mobile genetic element of Staphylococcus bacterial species. This genetic sequence includes the mecA gene coding for resistance to the antibiotic methicillin and is the only known way for Staphylococcus strains to spread the gene in the wild by horizontal gene transfer. SCCmec is a 21 to 60 kb long genetic element that confers broad-spectrum β-lactam resistance to MRSA. Moreover, additional genetic elements like Tn554, pT181, and pUB110 can be found in SCCmec, which have the capability to render resistance to various non-β-lactam drugs.

== Classification ==
Not all SCCmec elements are identical (in fact, SCC elements without the mecA gene do exist.) As of December 2021, SCCmec elements have been classified into fourteen types (I through XIV). One region is the mec complex including the mecA gene. The other is the ccr gene complex including genes coding for recombinases.

The mec complex is divided further into five types (I through V) based on the arrangement of regulatory genetic features such as mecR1, an inducer. The mec gene complex in SCCmec, comprising mec gene, its regulators (mecR1, mecI), and insertion sequences (IS), is categorized into five classes (A to E). Class A includes mecA, full mecR1, mecI, and IS431. Class B has IS1272, mecA, partial mecR1, and IS431. Class C, with two versions (C1, C2), contains mecA, partial mecR1, IS431, differing in IS431 orientation. Class D includes IS431, mecA, partial mecR1; Class E consists of blaZ, mecC, mecR1, mecI.

The ccr and mec gene complexes in SCCmec are connected by joining (J) regions, considered non-essential but capable of carrying extra antimicrobial resistance determinants. These are categorized as J1, J2, and J3, based on their SCCmec positions. J1, also known as the L-C region, lies between the right chromosomal junction and upstream of the ccr gene. J2, previously the C-M region, is situated between the ccr and mec gene complexes. J3 (formerly the I-R region) is found downstream of the mec gene complex, extending to the left chromosomal junction.

== Distribution ==
The SCCmec found in methicillin-resistant Staphylococcus aureus likely originated in coagulase-negative staphylococcal species and was acquired by S. aureus.

Staphylococcal strains isolated from pig farms were found to carry several different types of SCCmec, suggesting that they may serve as a reservoir of these elements.

== See also ==
- Mobile genetic elements
