= Phenol-soluble modulin =

Family of protein toxins

Phenol-soluble modulins (PSMs) are a family of small proteins, that carry out a variety of functions, including acting as toxins, assisting in biofilm formation, and colony spreading. PSMs are produced by Staphylococcus bacteria including Methicillin-resistant Staphylococcus aureus (MRSA), and Staphylococcus epidermidis. Many PSMs are encoded within the core genome and can play an important virulence factor. PSMs were first discovered in S. epidermidis by Seymour Klebanoff via hot-phenol extraction and were described as a pro-inflammatory complex of three peptides. Since their initial discovery, numerous roles of PSMs have been identified. However, due in part to the small size of many PSMs, they have largely gone unnoticed until recent years.

Although PSMs are present in every Staphylococcal species, there is still diversity. Staphylococcus aureus encodes eight different PSMs, PSMα 1-4, PSMβ 1-2, PSMγ (Also known as δ-toxin in S. aureus), and PSM-mec. While Staphylococcus epidermidis encodes one PSMα, PSMβ 1-2, PSMγ, and PSM-mec. In addition S. epidermidis encodes two unique PSMs, PSMδ and PSMε.

PSM-mec is one of the most widely encoded PSMs among Staphylococcal species, which may be in part due to PSM-mec being encoded on the mecI mobile genetic element.

== Structure and location ==
As the PSM classes are closely related there are many conserved aspects. However each PSM class plays a different role, as such there are some distinctive features for each. Generally, PSMs are encoded on the core genome of staphylococcal species. However, some such as PSM-mec are encoded on mobile genetic elements. PSMs are generally separated into one of two classes α-type PSMs and β-type PSMs, which are based upon characteristics of the two most well studied PSMs PSMα and PSMβ.

=== PSMα ===
PSMα forms an amphipathic α-helix structure that composes the entire length of the peptide. These peptides are relatively short, being composed of only 20-25 amino acids. With regard to charge, α-type PSMs generally have a neutral charge, but may also be slightly positive.

=== PSMβ ===
PSMβ are similar to PSMα in that they contain an amphipathic α-helix. However, the helix does not compose the entirety of the peptide, instead covering only the C-terminus of the peptide. PSMβ are generally larger than PSMα, being composed of 43-45 amino acids. Unlike α-type PSMs, β-type PSMs usually possess a negative charge.

=== PSMγ ===
PSMγ (also known as δ-Toxin) shares some homology with PSMα-3 encoded by S. aureus.

=== PSMδ ===
PSMδ is encoded downstream of the PSMα gene in S. epidermidis. In addition PSMδ shares some homology with PSMγ.

=== PSMε ===
Little work has been done to determine the structure of PSMε. However it is believed to play a role in both biofilm formation as well as inflammation.

=== PSM-mec ===
PSM-mec is encoded on the Staphylococcal Chromosomal Cassette methicillin resistance island (SCCmec) which encodes genes associated with methicillin resistance in different Staphylococcal species. Little work has been done to determine the exact structure of PSM-mec.

== Regulation ==
PSM regulation in S. aureus is primarily controlled by the agr system. The exact mechanism of regulation differs from other agr controlled toxins, which are controlled by the agr effector molecule RNAIII. PSMs, however, are controlled by direct binding of AgrA to the promoter region. PSM-mec RNA has been implicated in the regulation of the agr system and as a result can influence the expression of other PSMs. In addition to the agr system, SarA as well as LuxS have both been implicated in PSM control, with mutations in either system showing decreased levels of PSM production. In addition the MgrA system has been shown to alter biofilm formation, via suppression of PSMs. The environment S. aureus is exposed to has been demonstrated to play a role in PSM expression. In intracellular environments it has been shown that PSM production is increased.

In addition to being the subject of regulation, PSMs have been shown to regulate other toxins such as S. aureus alpha-toxin.

== Functions ==
=== Inflammation ===
PSMs were first described as a pro-inflammatory molecule. This role has been repeatedly demonstrated to be true. PSMs are able to induce the production of a variety of cytokines as well as induce neutrophils to migrate to sites of infection. PSMε in S. epidermidis is known to influence the production of IL-8. PSMα in S. aureus has been shown to influence IL-17 levels during infection.

In addition to their pro-inflammatory properties, PSMs have been shown to be directly sensed by circulating leucocytes through the formyl peptide receptor FPR2, thus driving a rapid, pathogen-specific attraction of neutrophiles to the site of infection, via an EGR1-dependent signalling pathway.

=== Infection ===
In addition to their role in attracting neutrophils to sites of infection, PSMs can also influence the function of neutrophils. It has been demonstrated that secreted PSMs are able to induce Neutrophil Extracellular Trap release. The PSMs also have been shown to decrease the number of persister cells within a population of S. aureus.

MRSA production of PSMs is thought to be a possible cause of severe infections. PSM production is higher in community-acquired MRSA (CA-MRSA) than in healthcare-associated MRSA (HA-MRSA), and consequently CA-MRSA associated osteomyelitis is more severe than HA-MRSA associated osteomyelitis.

=== Cell lysis ===
Many PSMs have cytolytic activity and play a major role in the nonspecific lysing of host cells, including Polymorphonuclear Leukocytes (PMNs). Lysis is carried out by integration of PSMs into membranes, in a nonspecific fashion, which results in disruption of the membrane. Different PSMs are able to lyse cells with different affinities. PSMα, in S. aureus, and PSMδ, in S. epidermidis, are the most potent cytolysins. While highly cytolytic PSMs, such as PSMα and PSMδ, are generally α-type PSMs, the β-type PSMs tend to be less cytolytic.

=== Colony spreading ===
S. aureus is a non-motile bacteria, and must rely on alternative forms of spreading. PSMs have been implicated in assisting with colony spreading. PSMα 1-4 have been shown to help S. aureus colonies spread on agar plates. However, δ-Toxin, which is another α-class PSM, does not play a role in colony spreading.

=== Biofilm formation ===
While the α-type PSMs are regarded as major cytolysins, both α-type and β-type PSMs are thought to play a role in biofilm formation. The aggregation of α-type PSMs into fibrils is able to modulate S. aureus biofilm formation. In vitro measurement of PSMβ expression in S. epidermidis has shown to be increased in biofilm as opposed to planktonic growth, suggesting a link between PSMβ and biofilm formation. Altering the structure of PSMβ has been demonstrated to disrupt their ability to influence biofilm formation.
