= Sudocrem =

Brand of topical antibacterial cream

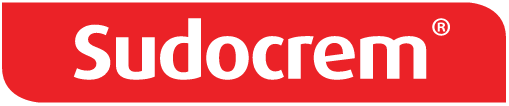
- The current logo, in use since 2013
- Industry: Medical
- Predecessor: Smith's Cream
- Founded: 1931; 95 years ago in Cabra, Dublin, Ireland
- Founder: Thomas Smith
- Services: Medication
- Parent: Actavis/Teva Pharmaceuticals
- Website: sudocrem.com

Sudocrem (/ˈsudəkrɛm/ or /ˈsudəkrim/ in Ireland) is an over-the-counter medicated cream aimed primarily at the treatment of irritant diaper dermatitis. It contains a water-repellent base (consisting of oils/waxes); protective and moisturizer agents; antibiotic and antifungal agents; and a weak anesthetic. As well as nappy rash, it can also be used to treat eczema, inverse psoriasis, pressure ulcers, minor burns, surface wounds, sunburn and chilblains. It was manufactured by pharmaceutical company Forest Laboratories Europe until July 2014 when the company was acquired by, and combined with, Actavis plc. On 17 March 2015, Actavis completed the acquisition of Allergan, creating a $23 billion diversified global pharmaceutical company. In 2016 Actavis was acquired by the Israeli pharmaceutical company Teva.

In Belgium, the product is sold under the brand "Dermocrem". The Netherlands was the first country Sudocrem was sold in outside Ireland and the UK. Sudocrem is also sold in Malaysia.

== History ==
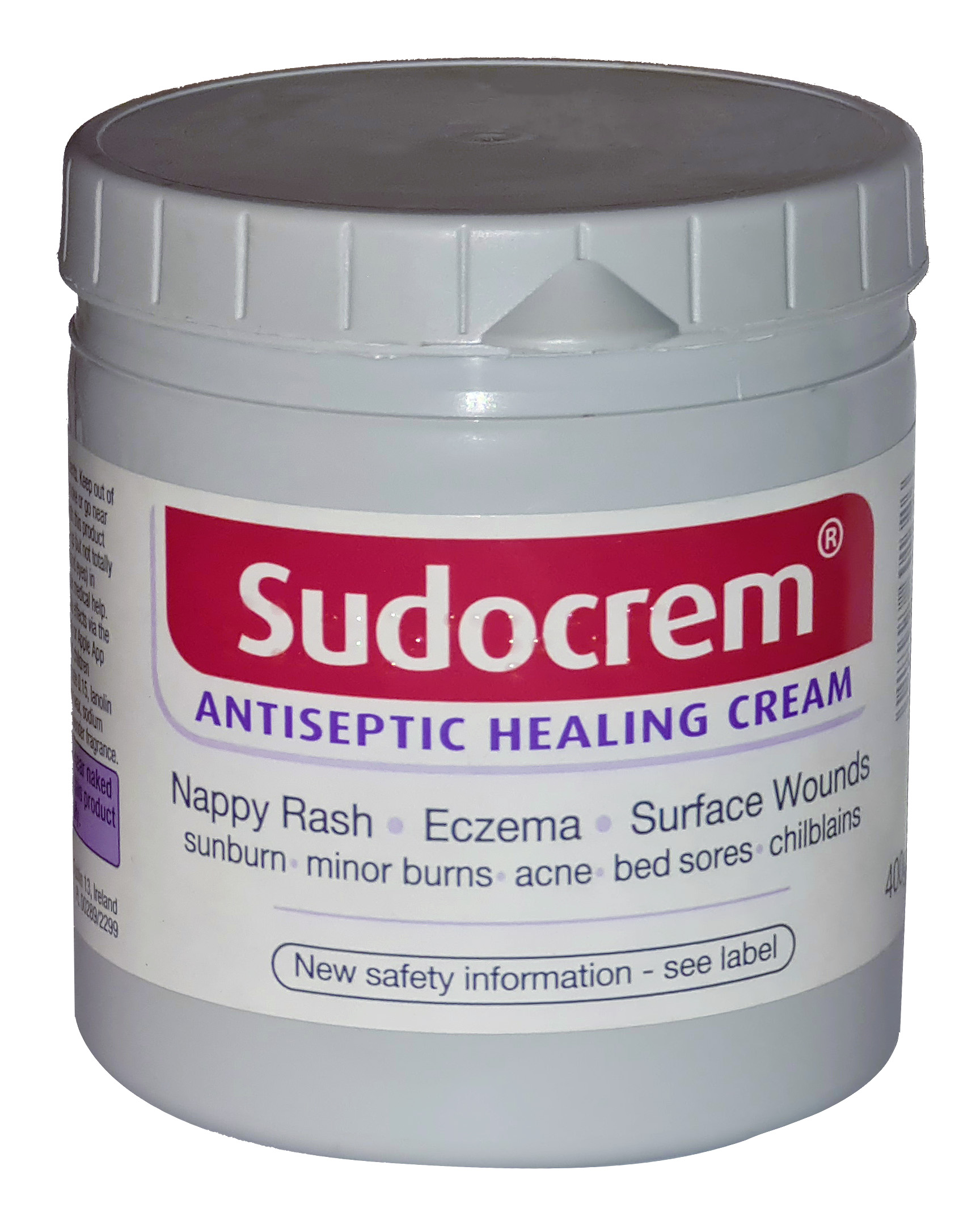
A 400g container of Sudocrem

Sudocrem was developed in 1931 by Dublin-based pharmacist Thomas Smith. It was originally called "Smith's Cream", later "Soothing Cream". The name changed to Sudocrem in 1950 due to the Dublin accent pronunciation of soothing cream. During the 1960s, samples of Sudocrem that were given to new mothers in Ireland increased the popularity of the product and the brand was gradually introduced to the UK in the 1970s. Its makers claim it to be the leading nappy rash cream in both Ireland and the United Kingdom. Sudocrem was manufactured in Dublin, in the suburb of Baldoyle but is now manufactured in Bulgaria. A 2012 Irish Independent article said: "Sudocrem is the spuds and bacon of skincare creams, the Guinness of gentle nappy rash reliefs and the Tayto of topical ointments," following reports in both Irish and UK media celebrities were using the product to treat acne. There are now three Sudocrem branded products available in the UK: the original antiseptic healing cream, Sudocrem Care and Protect which is a nappy rash preventative and Sudocrem Skin Care Cream which is an everyday acne cream aimed at the youth market.

Sudocrem's parent company Teva announced in May 2021 that is planning to close the Baldoyle plant and move production to Actavis' Bulgarian plant in Troyan in 2023. Teva said that reason for the closure was due to the growing international popularity of the cream, and the inability to make the site of the Baldoyle factory bigger to cope with the rising demand.

== Ingredients ==
Ingredient	% (w/w)	properties
Excipients	79.2%	water-repellent base
Zinc oxide, EP	15.25%	astringent, soothing, protective
Lanolin (hypoallergenic)	4.00%	emollient
Benzyl benzoate, BP	1.01%	vasodilation
Benzyl alcohol, BP	0.39%	mild anaesthetic, disinfectant
Benzyl cinnamate	0.15%	antibacterial, antifungal

== See also ==
- Acne
- Topical medication
