= MecA =

Gene for resistance to beta-lactam antibiotics

mecA is a gene found in bacterial cells which allows them to be resistant to antibiotics such as methicillin, penicillin and other penicillin-like antibiotics.

The bacteria strain most commonly known to carry mecA is methicillin-resistant Staphylococcus aureus (MRSA). In Staphylococcus species, mecA is spread through the staphylococcal chromosome cassette SCCmec genetic element. Resistant strains cause many hospital-acquired infections.

mecA encodes the protein PBP2A (penicillin-binding protein 2A), a transpeptidase that helps form the bacterial cell wall. PBP2A has a lower affinity for beta-lactam antibiotics such as methicillin and penicillin than DD-transpeptidase does, so it does not bind to the ringlike structure of penicillin-like antibiotics. This enables transpeptidase activity in the presence of beta-lactams, preventing them from inhibiting cell wall synthesis. The bacteria can then replicate as normal.

== History ==
Methicillin resistance first emerged in hospitals in Staphylococcus aureus that was more aggressive and failed to respond to methicillin treatment. The prevalence of this strain, MRSA, continued to increase, reaching up to 60% of British hospitals, and has spread throughout the world and beyond hospital settings. Researchers traced the source of this resistance to the mecA gene acquired through a mobile genetic element, staphylococcal cassette chromosome mec, present in all known MRSA strains. On February 27, 2017, the World Health Organization (WHO) put MRSA on their list of priority bacterial resistant pathogens and made it a high priority target for further research and treatment development.

== Detection ==
Successful treatment of MRSA begins with the detection of mecA, usually through polymerase chain reaction (PCR). Alternative methods include enzymatic detection PCR, which labels the PCR with enzymes detectable by immunoabsorbant assays. This takes less time and does not need gel electrophoresis, which can be costly, tedious, and unpredictable. cefoxitin disc diffusion uses phenotypic resistance to test not only for methicillin resistant strains but also for low resistant strains. The presence of mecA alone does not determine resistant strains; further phenotypic assays of mecA-positive strains can determine how resistant the strain is to methicillin. These phenotypic assays cannot rely on the accumulation of PBP2a, the protein product of mecA, as a test for methicillin resistance, as no connection between protein amount and resistance exists.

== Structure ==
mecA is on staphylococcal cassette chromosome mec, a mobile gene element from which the gene can undergo horizontal gene transfer and insert itself into the host species, which can be any species in the Staphylococcus genus. This cassette is a 52 kilobase piece of DNA that contains mecA and two recombinase genes, ccrA and ccrB. Proper insertion of the mecA complex into the host genome requires the recombinases. Researchers have isolated multiple genetic variants from resistant strains of S. aureus, but all variants function similarly and have the same insertion site, near the host DNA origin of replication. mecA also forms a complex with two regulatory units, mecI and mecR1. These two genes can repress mecA; deletions or knock-outs in these genes increase resistance of S. aureus to methicillin. The S. aureus strains isolated from humans either lack these regulatory elements or contain mutations in these genes that cause a loss of function of the protein products that inhibit mecA. This in turn, causes constitutive transcription of mecA. This cassette chromosome can move between species. Two other Staphylococci species, S.epidermidis and S.haemolyticus, show conservation in this insertion site, not only for mecA but also for other non-essential genes the cassette chromosome can carry.

== Mechanism of resistance ==
Penicillin, its derivatives and methicillin, and other beta-lactam antibiotics inhibits activity of the cell-wall forming penicillin-binding protein family (PBP 1, 2, 3 and 4). This disrupts the cell wall structure, causing the cytoplasm to leak and cell death. However, mecA codes for PBP2a that has a lower affinity for beta-lactams, which keeps the structural integrity of the cell wall, preventing cell death. Bacterial cell wall synthesis in S. aureus depends on transglycosylation to form linear polymer of sugar monomers and transpeptidation to form an interlinking peptides to strengthen the newly developed cell wall. PBPs have a transpeptidase domain, but scientists thought only monofunctional enzymes catalyze transglycosylation, yet PBP2 has domains to perform both essential processes. When antibiotics enter the medium, they bind to the transpeptidation domain and inhibit PBPs from cross-linking muropeptides, therefore preventing the formation of stable cell wall. With cooperative action, PBP2a lacks the proper receptor for the antibiotics and continues transpeptidation, preventing cell wall breakdown. The functionality of PBP2a depends on two structural factors on the cell wall of S. aureus. First, for PBP2a to properly fit onto the cell wall, to continue transpeptidation, it needs the proper amino acid residues, specifically a pentaglycine residue and an amidated glutamate residue. Second, PBP2a has an effective transpeptidase activity but lacks the transglycosylation domain of PBP2, which builds the backbone of the cell wall with polysaccharide monomers, so PBP2a must rely on PBP2 to continue this process. The latter forms a therapeutic target to improve the ability of beta-lactams to prevent cell wall synthesis in resistant S. aureus. Identifying inhibitors of glycosylases involved in the cell wall synthesis and modulating their expression can resensitize these previously resistant bacteria to beta-lactam treatment. For example, epicatechin gallate, a compound found in green tea, has shown signs of lowering the resistance to beta-lactams, to the point where oxacillin, which acts on PBP2 and PBP2a, effectively inhibits cell wall formation.

Interactions with other genes decrease resistance to beta-lactams in resistant strains of S. aureus. These gene networks are mainly involved in cell division, and cell wall synthesis and function, where there PBP2a localizes. Furthermore, other PBP proteins also affect the resistance of S. aureus to antibiotics. Oxacillin resistance decreased in S. aureus strains when expression of PBP4 was inhibited but PBP2a was not.

== Evolutionary history ==
mecA is acquired and transmitted through a mobile genetic element, that inserts itself into the host genome. That structure is conserved between the mecA gene product and a homologous mecA gene product in Staphylococcus sciuri. As of 2007, function for the mecA homologue in S. sciuri remains unknown, but they may be a precursor for the mecA gene found in S. aureus. The structure of the protein product of this homologue is so similar that the protein can be used in S. aureus. When the mecA homologue of beta-lactam resistant S. sciuri is inserted into antibiotic sensitive S. aureus, antibiotics resistance increases. Even though the muropeptides (peptidoglycan precursors) that both species use are the same, the protein product of mecA gene of the S. sciuri can continue cell wall synthesis when a beta-lactam inhibits the PBP protein family.

To further understand the origin of mecA, specifically the mecA complex found on the Staphylococcal cassette chromosome, researchers used the mecA gene from S. sciuri in comparison to other Staphylococci species. Nucleotide analysis shows the sequence of mecA is almost identical to the mecA homologue found in Staphylococcus fleurettii, the most significant candidate for the origin of the mecA gene on the staphylococcal cassette chromosome. Since the genome of the S. fleurettii contains this gene, the cassette chromosome must originate from another species.
