= Propyl cinnamate =

Names
- Systematic IUPAC name Propyl (2E)-3-phenylprop-2-enoate

Identifiers
CAS Number	7778-83-8
3D model (JSmol)	Interactive image
ChEBI	CHEBI:8501
ChEMBL	ChEMBL1911048
ChemSpider	4435547
EC Number	231-916-0
KEGG	C06360
PubChem CID	5270647
UNII	LBK26E89VE
CompTox Dashboard (EPA)	DTXSID00225514
- InChI: InChI=1S/C12H14O2/c1-2-10-14-12(13)9-8-11-6-4-3-5-7-11/h3-9H,2,10H2,1H3/b9-8+ Key: OLLPXZHNCXACMM-CMDGGOBGSA-N
- SMILES: CCCOC(=O)/C=C/C1=CC=CC=C1

Properties
Chemical formula	C_{12}H_{14}O_{2}
Molar mass	190.242 g·mol^{−1}
Appearance	colorless
Odor	sweet, slightly floral
Density	1.030-1.040
Boiling point	283–284 °C (541–543 °F; 556–557 K)
Solubility in water	insoluble
Solubility	soluble in oils miscible in ethanol
Refractive index (n_{D})	1.547-1.553

Hazards
- GHS labelling
Pictograms	(GHS02: Flammable)
Signal word	Warning
Hazard statements	H226
Precautionary statements	P210, P233, P240, P241, P242, P243, P280, P303+P361+P353, P370+P378, P403+P235, P501

Related compounds
Related cinnamate esters	Methyl cinnamate; Ethyl cinnamate
- Except where otherwise noted, data are given for materials in their standard state (at 25 °C [77 °F], 100 kPa). Infobox references

Propyl cinnamate is an organic chemical compound belonging to the ester group. It is an ester of cinnamic acid and 1-propanol. It is a colorless, viscous liquid with a sweet, floral scent and is insoluble in water. Propyl cinnamate is used as a flavoring agent, it's flavor profile is peach.

It is found in certain plants, such as Artemisia salsoloides.

== Preparation ==
Propyl cinnamate can be prepared by esterification of cinnamic acid with propyl alcohol in the presence of hydrochloric acid as a catalyst; or by direct esterification in the presence of benzene.
