= MRSA ST398 =

Staphylococcus aureus ST398

Scientific classification
- Domain: Bacteria
- Kingdom: Bacillati
- Phylum: Bacillota
- Class: Bacilli
- Order: Caryophanales
- Family: Staphylococcaceae
- Genus: Staphylococcus
- Species: S. aureus
- Strain: S. a. ST398

Trionomial name
- Staphylococcus aureus ST398

Bacterium resistant to many antibiotics

MRSA ST398 (Methicillin-resistant Staphylococcus aureus ST398) is a specific strain of Methicillin-resistant Staphylococcus aureus (MRSA). Staphylococcus aureus is a gram-positive, spherical bacterium that can cause a range of infections in humans and animals; Methicillin-resistant Staphylococcus aureus (MRSA) is a bacterium that is resistant to many antibiotics. The abbreviation "ST" in MRSA ST398 refers to the sequence type of the bacterium. MRSA ST398 is a clonal complex 398 (CC398). This means that the strain had emerged in a human clinic, without any obvious or understandable causes. MRSA ST398, a specific strain of MRSA, is commonly found in livestock, and can cause infections in humans who come into contact with infected animals.

== Taxonomy ==
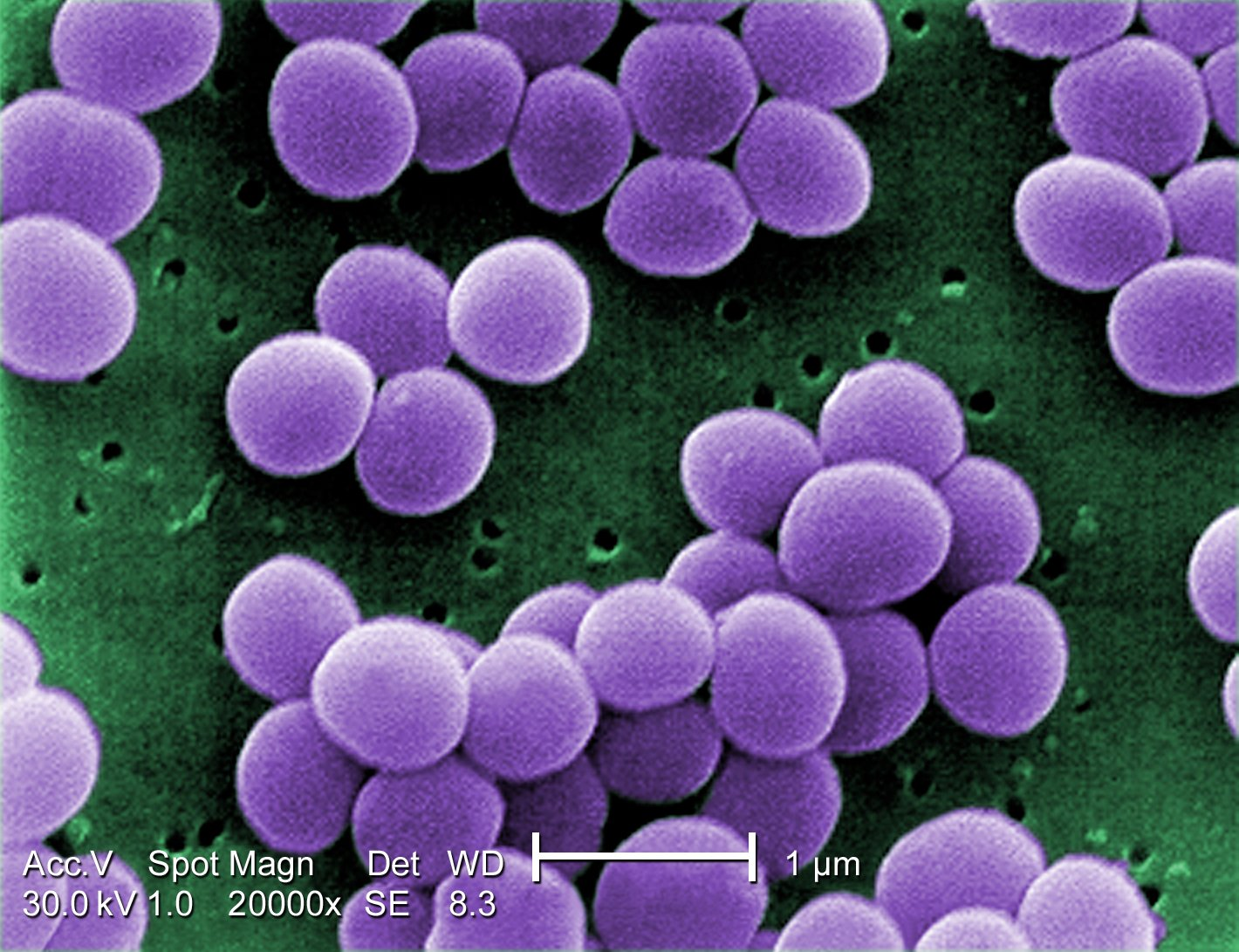
Staphylococcus aureus

MRSA ST398 is a strain of the gram-positive bacterium Staphylococcus aureus, which belongs to the genus Staphylococcus. This genus covers a large group of gram-positive bacteria that are classified taxonomically in the family Staphylococcaceae, order Bacillales, class Bacilli, and phylum Bacillota.

== Discovery ==
MRSA ST398, a new strain of MRSA, was first found in 2003, in Dutch hospitals. The bacteria was found specifically in people who were frequently in contact with livestock, particularly pigs and veal calves. A study from a Dutch farm found that most of the MRSA strains found in livestock and humans were of the CC398 isolate. The study also found that the closer people lived to a livestock farm, the more cases of MRSA ST398 were found. Since then, the strain has also been detected in many other regions of the world.

== Transmission ==
The primary method of transmission of MRSA ST398 is through contact with infected animals, which classifies it as a zoonotic agent. People who work with livestock or live in close proximity to them are the most vulnerable to the infection. In healthcare settings, people with open wounds are most susceptible to the infection. Therefore, to prevent transmission, wounds should stay covered and infected patients should not be near each other. As a zoonotic agent, MRSA ST398 can be transmitted from animal to human, human to animals, and human to human, which is an important factor when considering mitigation protocol. Transmission of MRSA ST398 is similar to that of MRSA. MRSA ST398 has an enhanced biofilm formation ability, which increases the survivability of the bacteria and increases its virulence. This increases the fitness of MRSA ST398 in the community and even in the healthcare settings, which poses a severe threat to public health.

== Infection ==
=== Symptoms and signs ===
MRSA ST398 infection symptoms are similar to those of other MRSA infections. This includes skin infections, abscesses, sores, and pneumonia. In severe cases, MRSA ST98 can lead to sepsis and death.

=== Prevention ===
Patient education is a critical component of treatment and prevention. Clinicians are encouraged to educate patients, caregivers, and household members on methods to limit further spread of MRSA in the community. This includes maintaining adequate hygiene and keeping wounds covered with clean, dry bandages. Infected persons should also be excluded from activities that involve close contact with others. Before treatment, prevention is incredibly important to prevent the spread of the MRSA strain. This involves practicing good hygiene and infection control measures, particularly in healthcare settings and for those who work closely with livestock. An increased study of MRSA ST398, especially in livestock, is important to reduce the burden of the pathogen in hospital settings. This also included closer observation of people who are in close contact with livestock, as early diagnoses can allow for earlier treatment. This is especially important, as antibiotics cannot be successful in antibiotic resistant bacteria. And an increased use of antibiotics further promotes the evolution of antibiotic resistant bacteria. Specifically, for MRSA ST398, the link between antibiotic use in livestock and the emergence of MRSA ST398 is not yet fully understood. Furthermore, a OneHeath approach should be implemented, which brings together multiple disciplines in policy; advocacy; animal, human, and environmental health, and more to tackle a public health issue.

=== Treatment ===
MRSA ST398 is resistant to many antimicrobial agents; therefore, treatment options for this strain are limited. However, hospitalization and aggressive treatment to treat the symptoms of MRSA ST398 can be employed. Until more information about antibiotic susceptibilities are known, the ST398 strain should be treated as MRSA.
