= XF-73 =

Identifiers
CAS Number	718638-68-7
3D model (JSmol)	Interactive image
ChemSpider	8094227
PubChem CID	9918582
UNII	1912L54M2V
CompTox Dashboard (EPA)	DTXSID20992574
- InChI: InChI=1S/C44H50N6O2.2ClH/c1-49(2,3)25-7-27-51-37-17-9-31(10-18-37)43-39-21-13-33(45-39)29-35-15-23-41(47-35)44(42-24-16-36(48-42)30-34-14-22-40(43)46-34)32-11-19-38(20-12-32)52-28-8-26-50(4,5)6;;/h9-24,29-30,45-46H,7-8,25-28H2,1-6H3;2*1H/q+2;;/p-2/b33-29-,34-30-,35-29-,36-30-,43-39-,43-40-,44-41-,44-42-;; Key: BXHQXSXRVAELBC-XRFOENPRSA-L; InChI=1/C44H50N6O2.2ClH/c1-49(2,3)25-7-27-51-37-17-9-31(10-18-37)43-39-21-13-33(45-39)29-35-15-23-41(47-35)44(42-24-16-36(48-42)30-34-14-22-40(43)46-34)32-11-19-38(20-12-32)52-28-8-26-50(4,5)6;;/h9-24,29-30,45-46H,7-8,25-28H2,1-6H3;2*1H/q+2;;/p-2/b33-29-,34-30-,35-29-,36-30-,43-39-,43-40-,44-41-,44-42-;; Key: BXHQXSXRVAELBC-NDLTUMITBE
- SMILES: C[N+](C)(C)CCCOC(C=C1)=CC=C1/C(C2=CC=C(/C=C3C=CC(/C(C4=CC=C(OCCC[N+](C)(C)C)C=C4)=C(N/5)/C=CC5=C\6)=N/3)N2)=C7N=C6C=C/7.[Cl-].[Cl-]

Properties
Chemical formula	C_{44}H_{50}Cl_{2}N_{6}O_{2}
Molar mass	765.82 g·mol^{−1}
- Except where otherwise noted, data are given for materials in their standard state (at 25 °C [77 °F], 100 kPa). Infobox references

XF-73 (Exeporfinium chloride) is an experimental drug candidate. It is an anti-microbial that works via weakening bacteria cell walls. It is a potential treatment for methicillin-resistant Staphylococcus aureus (MRSA) and possibly Clostridioides difficile. It is being developed by Destiny Pharma Ltd.

Structurally, it is a dicationic porphyrin.

It has completed a phase I clinical trial for nasal decolonisation of MRSA—being tested against 5 bacterial strains. It seems unlikely to cause MRSA to develop resistance to it.

In 2014, a phase 1 clinical trial for nasal administration was run.

As of June 2022, another phase 1 clinical trial (for nasal administration) completed recruiting in 2016 but no results have been posted.
