= Allocinnamic acid =

Names
- IUPAC name (Z)-3-phenylprop-2-enoic acid
- Other names cis-β-carboxystyrene, cis-cinnamic acid;

Identifiers
| CAS Number | 102-94-3 |
| 3D model (JSmol) | Interactive image |
| ChEBI | CHEBI:35699 |
| ChemSpider | 10286933 |
| ECHA InfoCard | 100.262.470 |
| EC Number | 827-073-9 |
| Gmelin Reference | 279588 |
| PubChem CID | 5372954 |
| UNII | YB7ZGY8NE2 |
| CompTox Dashboard (EPA) | DTXSID001019000 |
- InChI: InChI=1S/C9H8O2/c10-9(11)7-6-8-4-2-1-3-5-8/h1-7H,(H,10,11)/b7-6- Key: WBYWAXJHAXSJNI-SREVYHEPSA-N
- SMILES: C1=CC=C(C=C1)C=CC(=O)O

Properties
| Chemical formula | C_{9}H_{8}O_{6} |
| Molar mass | 212.157 g·mol^{−1} |
| Appearance | colorless crystals |
| Density | 1.49 g/cm³ |
| Melting point | 68 °C (154 °F; 341 K) |
| Boiling point | 265 °C (509 °F; 538 K) |
| Solubility in water | soluble |
- Except where otherwise noted, data are given for materials in their standard state (at 25 °C [77 °F], 100 kPa). Infobox references

Allocinnamic acid is a cis-isomer of cinnamic acid, into which the cinnamic acid is easily converted.

== Synthesis ==
Allocinnamic acid was first discovered by Carl Liebermann in 1890 in coca leaves, then Liebermann found that this acid is formed during the reduction (by zinc dust in an alcoholic solution during boiling) of β-dibromopropiolic acid.

== Physical properties ==
Allocinnamic acid crystallizes in the form of three crystalline modifications with melting points of 68 °C, 58 °C, and 42 °C. It is hardly soluble in water and cold ligroin, easily soluble in alcohol and ether, and does not change in dim light.

== Chemical properties ==
When heated briefly with concentrated sulfuric acid, the compound turns into cinnamic acid.

It forms liquid anhydride with acetic anhydride, which turns into cinnamic acid anhydride when heated.
