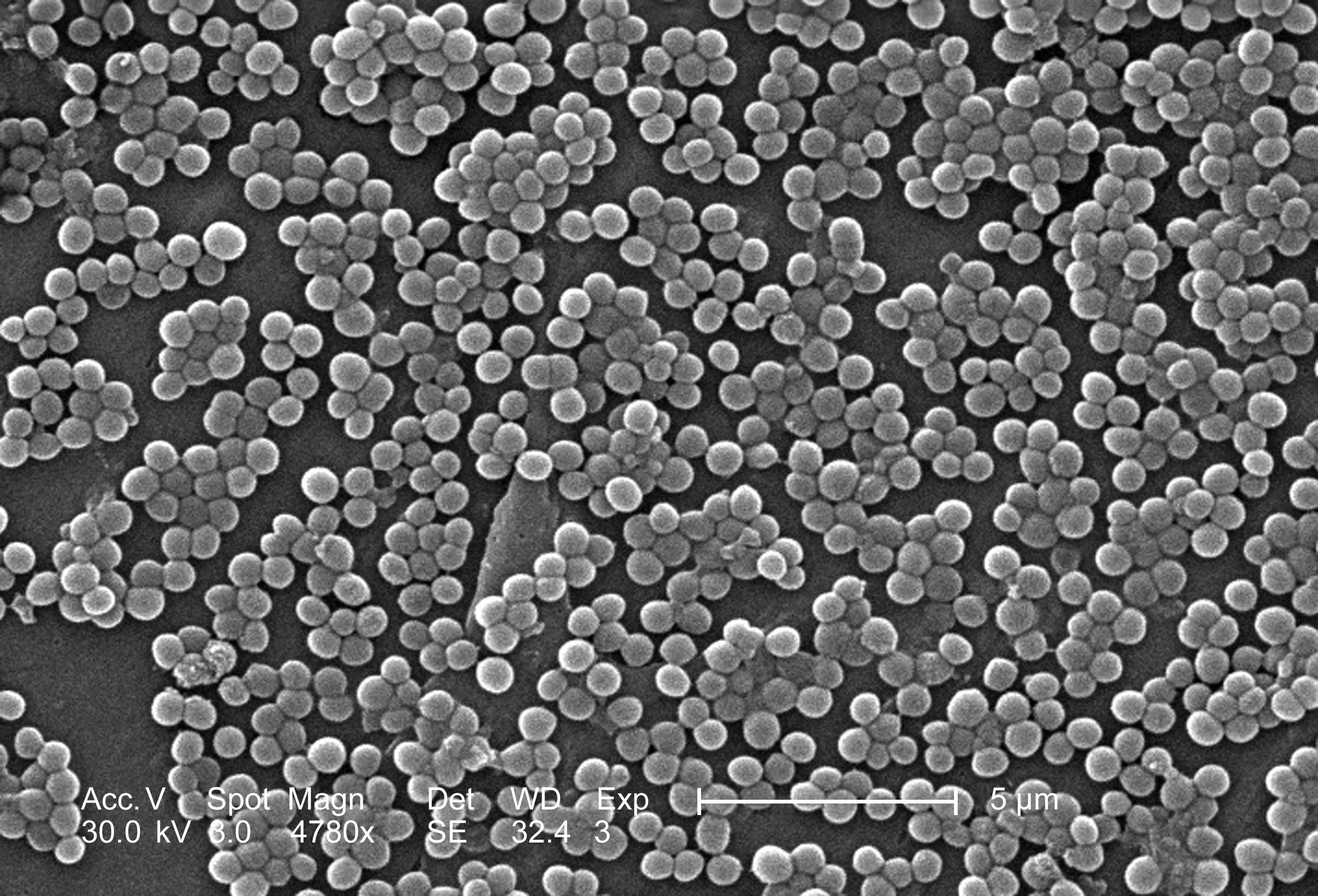
- Electron micrograph of MRSA

Scientific classification
- Domain: Bacteria
- Kingdom: Bacillati
- Phylum: Bacillota
- Class: Bacilli
- Order: Bacillales
- Family: Staphylococcaceae
- Genus: Staphylococcus
- Species: S. aureus
- Strain: S. a. ST8:USA300

Trionomial name
- Staphylococcus aureus ST8:USA300

= ST8:USA300 =

Staphylococcus aureus ST8:USA300

Strain of bacteria

ST8:USA300 is a strain of community-associated methicillin-resistant Staphylococcus aureus (MRSA) that has emerged as a particularly antibiotic resistant epidemic that is responsible for rapidly progressive, fatal diseases including necrotizing pneumonia, severe sepsis and necrotizing fasciitis.

The epidemiology of infections caused by MRSA is rapidly changing: in the past 10 years, infections caused by this organism have emerged in the community (whereas previously MRSA infections were almost exclusively hospital-acquired). The two MRSA clones in the United States most closely associated with community outbreaks, USA400 (MW2 strain, ST1 lineage) and USA300, often contain Panton-Valentine leukocidin (PVL) genes and, more frequently, have been associated with skin and soft tissue infections.

Outbreaks of community-associated (CA)-MRSA infections have been reported in correctional facilities, among athletic teams, among military recruits, in newborn nurseries, and among sexually active men who have sex with men, CA-MRSA infections now appear to be endemic in many urban regions and cause most MRSA infections.
