= Cinnamic acid =

- Skeletal formula of trans-cinnamic acid

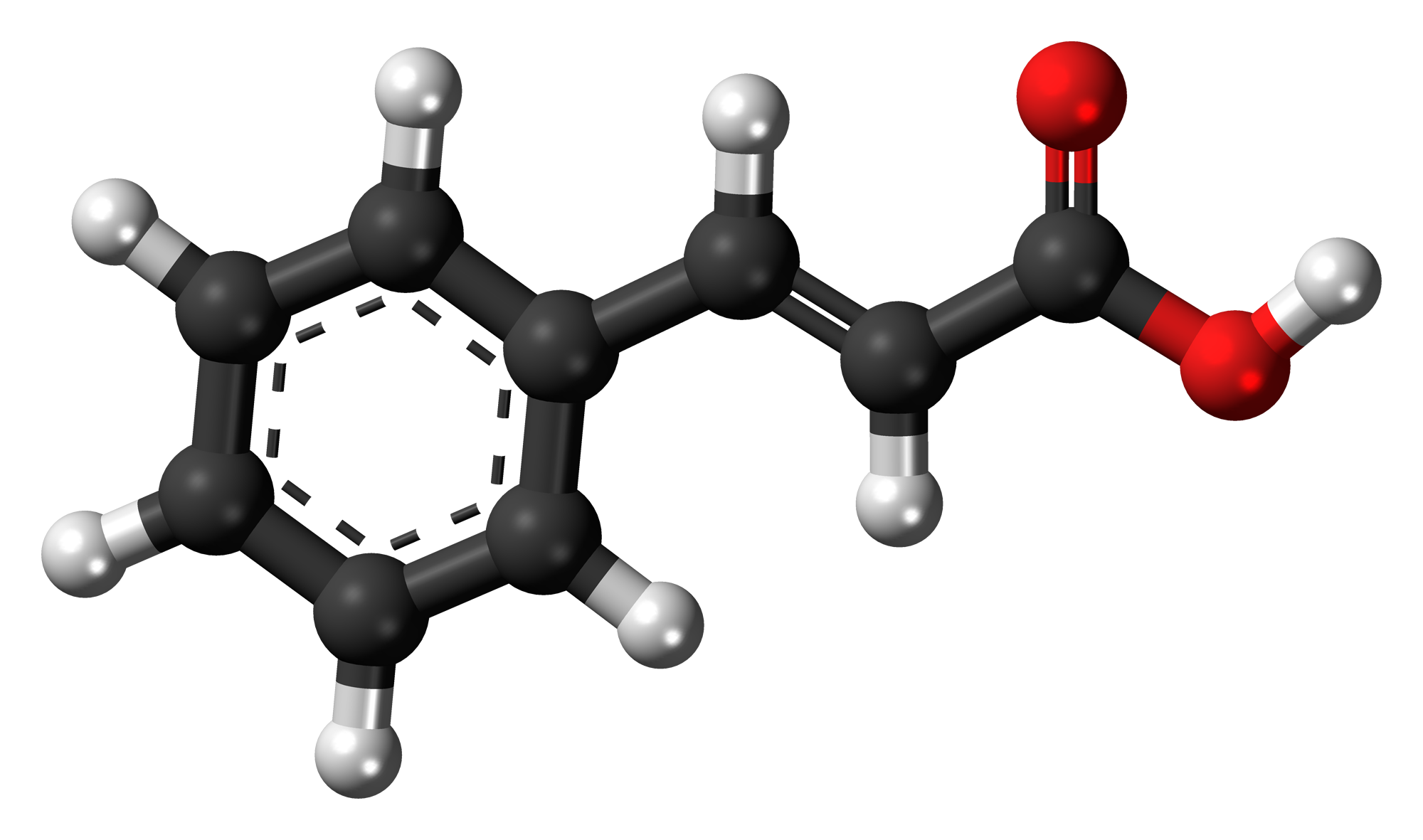
- Ball-and-stick model of the trans-cinnamic acid molecule

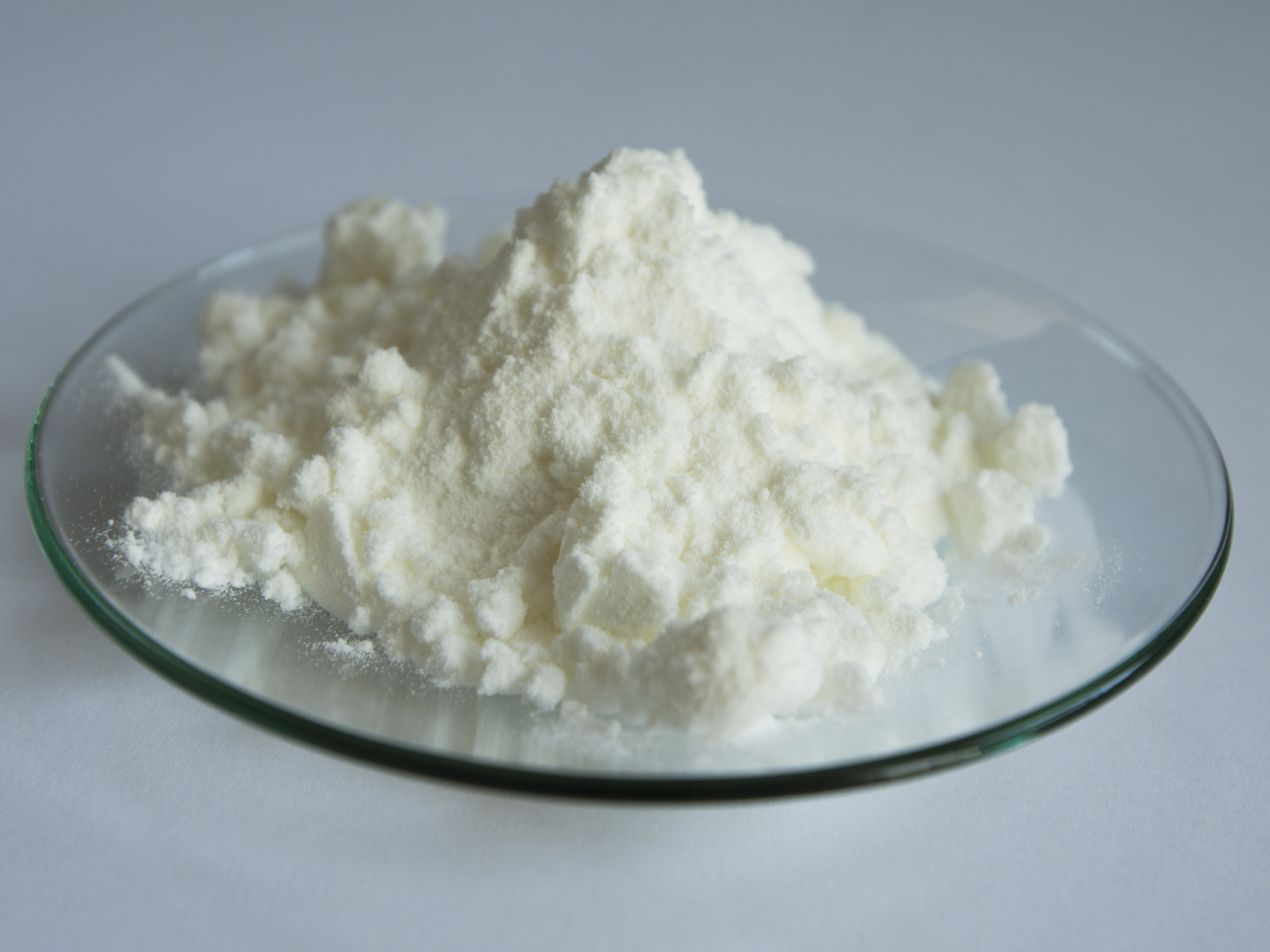
- Sample of the compound cinnamic acid in powder form

Names
- Preferred IUPAC name Cinnamic acid
- Systematic IUPAC name (2E)-3-Phenylprop-2-enoic acid
- Other names trans-Cinnamic acid Phenylacrylic acid Cinnamylic acid 3-Phenylacrylic acid (E)-Cinnamic acid Benzenepropenoic acid Isocinnamic acid

Identifiers
| CAS Number | 140-10-3 |
| 3D model (JSmol) | Interactive image |
| Beilstein Reference | 1905952 |
| ChEBI | CHEBI:35697 |
| ChEMBL | ChEMBL27246 |
| ChemSpider | 392447 |
| ECHA InfoCard | 100.004.908 |
| EC Number | 205-398-1 |
| Gmelin Reference | 3731 |
| IUPHAR/BPS | 3203 |
| KEGG | C00423 |
| PubChem CID | 444539 |
| UNII | U14A832J8D |
| CompTox Dashboard (EPA) | DTXSID5022489 |
- InChI: InChI=1S/C9H8O2/c10-9(11)7-6-8-4-2-1-3-5-8/h1-7H,(H,10,11)/b7-6+ Key: WBYWAXJHAXSJNI-VOTSOKGWSA-N; InChI=1/C9H8O2/c10-9(11)7-6-8-4-2-1-3-5-8/h1-7H,(H,10,11)/b7-6+ Key: WBYWAXJHAXSJNI-VOTSOKGWBT
- SMILES: O=C(O)\C=C\c1ccccc1

Properties
| Chemical formula | C_{9}H_{8}O_{2} |
| Molar mass | 148.161 g·mol^{−1} |
| Appearance | White monoclinic crystals |
| Odor | Honey-like |
| Density | 1.2475 g/cm^{3} |
| Melting point | 133 °C (271 °F; 406 K) |
| Boiling point | 300 °C (572 °F; 573 K) |
| Solubility in water | 500 mg/L |
| Acidity (pK_{a}) | 4.44 |
| Magnetic susceptibility (χ) | −7.836×10^{−5} cm^{3}/mol |

Hazards
- GHS labelling
| Pictograms | (GHS07: Exclamation mark) |
| Signal word | Warning |
| Hazard statements | H315, H319, H335 |
| Precautionary statements | P261, P264, P271, P280, P302+P352, P304+P340, P305+P351+P338, P312, P321, P332+P313, P337+P313, P362, P403+P233, P405, P501 |
| NFPA 704 (fire diamond) | 1 1 0 |
| Flash point | > 100 °C (212 °F; 373 K) |

Related compounds
| Related compounds | Benzoic acid, Phenylacetic acid, Phenylpropanoic acid |
- Except where otherwise noted, data are given for materials in their standard state (at 25 °C [77 °F], 100 kPa). verify (what is ?) Infobox references

Cinnamic acid is an organic compound with the formula C_{6}H_{5}−CH=CH−COOH. It is a white crystalline compound that is slightly soluble in water, and freely soluble in many organic solvents. Classified as an unsaturated carboxylic acid, it occurs naturally in a number of plants. It exists as both a cis and a trans isomer, although the latter is more common. The cis-isomer is called allocinnamic acid.

== Occurrence and production ==
=== Biosynthesis ===
Cinnamic acid is a central intermediate in the biosynthesis of a myriad of natural products including lignols (precursors to lignin and lignocellulose), flavonoids, isoflavonoids, coumarins, aurones, stilbenes, catechin, and phenylpropanoids. Its biosynthesis involves the action of the enzyme phenylalanine ammonia-lyase (PAL) on phenylalanine.

=== Natural occurrence ===
It is obtained from oil of cinnamon, or from balsams such as storax. It is also found in shea butter. Cinnamic acid has a honey-like odor; and its more volatile ethyl ester, ethyl cinnamate, is a flavor component in the essential oil of cinnamon, in which related cinnamaldehyde is the major constituent. It is also found in wood from many diverse tree species.

=== Synthesis ===
Cinnamic acid was first synthesized by the base-catalyzed condensation of acetyl chloride and benzaldehyde, followed by hydrolysis of the acid chloride product. In 1890, Rainer Ludwig Claisen described the synthesis of ethyl cinnamate via the reaction of ethyl acetate with benzaldehyde in the presence of sodium as base. Another way of preparing cinnamic acid is by the Knoevenagel condensation reaction. The reactants for this are benzaldehyde and malonic acid in the presence of a weak base, followed by acid-catalyzed decarboxylation. It can also be prepared by oxidation of cinnamaldehyde, condensation of benzal chloride and sodium acetate (followed by acid hydrolysis), and the Perkin reaction. The oldest commercially used route to cinnamic acid involves the Perkin reaction, which is given in the following scheme:

Synthesis of cinnamic acid via the Perkin reaction.

== Metabolism ==
Cinnamic acid, obtained from autoxidation of cinnamaldehyde, is metabolized into sodium benzoate in the liver.

== Uses ==
Cinnamic acid is used in flavorings, synthetic indigo, and certain pharmaceuticals. A major use is as a precursor to produce esters such as methyl cinnamate, ethyl cinnamate, and benzyl cinnamate for the perfume industry. Another example of cinnamic acid ester is propyl cinnamate which is used as flavoring. Cinnamic acid is a precursor to the sweetener aspartame via enzyme-catalysed amination with phenylalanine. Cinnamic acid can dimerize in non-polar solvents resulting in different linear free energy relationships.

Cinnamic acid can be modified by substituting one or more fluorine atoms for hydrogen in the phenyl ring to form fluorocinnamic acid. Fluorocinnamic acid may be used in medicinal chemistry and functional materials. It can serve as an intermediate in the synthesis of pharmaceuticals and agrochemicals.
