= Benzyl cinnamate =

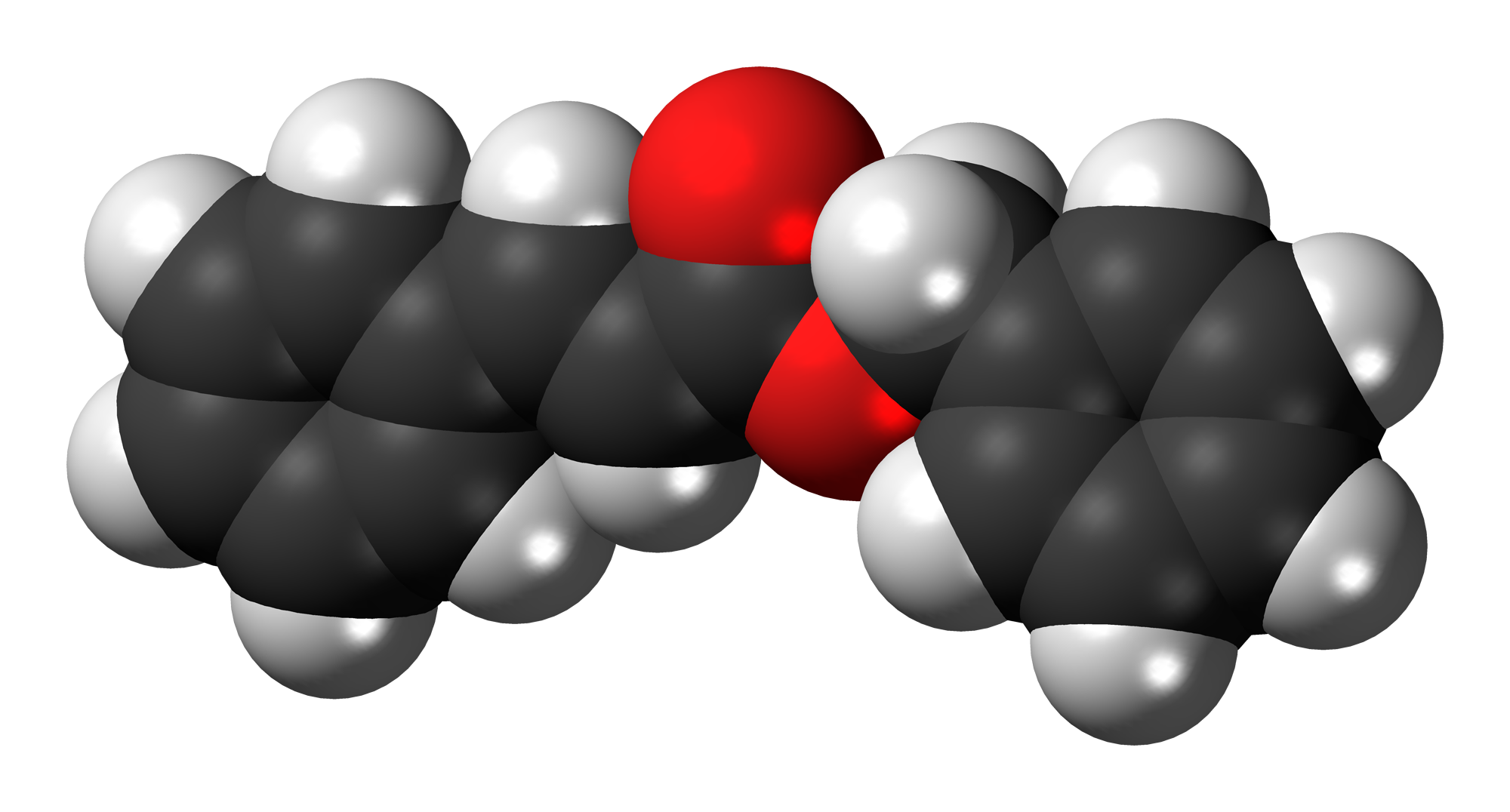

Names
- Preferred IUPAC name Benzyl (2E)-3-phenylprop-2-enoate
- Other names Benzyl cinnamate Cinnamein; Benzyl cinnamoate Benzyl 3-phenylpropenoate 3-Phenyl-2-propenoic acid phenylmethyl ester Cinnamic acid benzyl ester

Identifiers
CAS Number	103-41-3
3D model (JSmol)	Interactive image
ChemSpider	4437893
ECHA InfoCard	100.002.827
PubChem CID	5273469
UNII	V67O3RO97U
CompTox Dashboard (EPA)	DTXSID00880905 DTXSID3041663, DTXSID00880905
- InChI: InChI=1S/C16H14O2/c17-16(12-11-14-7-3-1-4-8-14)18-13-15-9-5-2-6-10-15/h1-12H,13H2/b12-11+ Key: NGHOLYJTSCBCGC-VAWYXSNFSA-N
- SMILES: C1=CC=C(C=C1)COC(=O)C=CC2=CC=CC=C2

Properties
Chemical formula	C_{16}H_{14}O_{2}
Molar mass	238.286 g·mol^{−1}
Appearance	White to pale yellow solid
Melting point	34–37 °C (93–99 °F; 307–310 K)
Boiling point	195–200 °C (383–392 °F; 468–473 K) 5 mmHg
Solubility in water	Insoluble
Solubility in ethanol	125 g/L
Solubility in glycerin	Insoluble
Solubility in propylene glycol	Insoluble
- Except where otherwise noted, data are given for materials in their standard state (at 25 °C [77 °F], 100 kPa). Infobox references

Benzyl cinnamate is the chemical compound which is the ester derived from cinnamic acid and benzyl alcohol.

== Natural occurrence ==
Balsam is the major producer of benzyl cinnamate. It is used as an ingredient in the medicated cream product Sudocrem.

== Uses ==
It is used as a flavoring agent. It has a low odour smelling faintly sweet, balsamic, floral, fruity, cherry, spicy, and powdery.

It is used pharmaceutically as an antibacterial and antifungal.
