= Ethyl cinnamate =

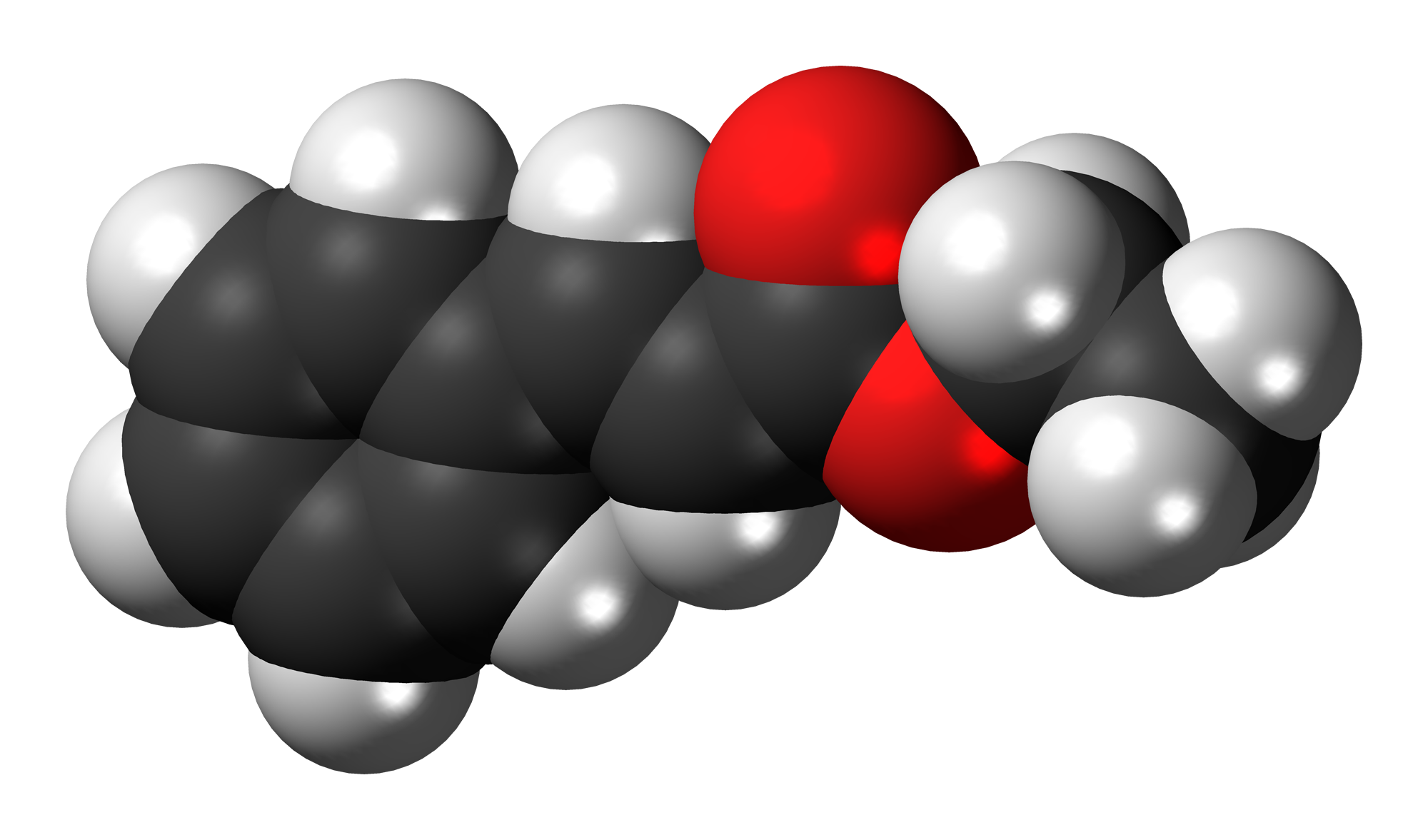

Names
- Preferred IUPAC name Ethyl (2E)-3-phenylprop-2-enoate
- Other names Ethyl cinnamate

Identifiers
CAS Number	103-36-6
3D model (JSmol)	Interactive image
ChEMBL	ChEMBL318196
ChemSpider	553344
PubChem CID	637758
UNII	C023P3M5JJ
CompTox Dashboard (EPA)	DTXSID9022520
- InChI: InChI=1S/C11H12O2/c1-2-13-11(12)9-8-10-6-4-3-5-7-10/h3-9H,2H2,1H3/b9-8+ Key: KBEBGUQPQBELIU-CMDGGOBGSA-N; InChI=1/C11H12O2/c1-2-13-11(12)9-8-10-6-4-3-5-7-10/h3-9H,2H2,1H3/b9-8+ Key: KBEBGUQPQBELIU-CMDGGOBGBD
- SMILES: CCOC(=O)/C=C/c1ccccc1

Properties
Chemical formula	C_{11}H_{12}O_{2}
Molar mass	176.21 g/mol
Density	1.046 g/cm^{3}
Melting point	6.5 to 8 °C (43.7 to 46.4 °F; 279.6 to 281.1 K)
Boiling point	271 °C (520 °F; 544 K)
Magnetic susceptibility (χ)	−107.5·10^{−6} cm^{3}/mol
- Except where otherwise noted, data are given for materials in their standard state (at 25 °C [77 °F], 100 kPa). verify (what is ?) Infobox references

Ethyl cinnamate is the ester of cinnamic acid and ethanol. It is present in the essential oil of cinnamon. Pure ethyl cinnamate has a "fruity and balsamic odor, reminiscent of cinnamon with an amber note".

The p-methoxy derivative is reported to be a monoamine oxidase inhibitor. It can be synthesized by the esterification reaction involving ethanol and cinnamic acid in the presence of sulfuric acid.

== List of plants that contain the chemical ==
- Kaempferia galanga
