= European rabbit in New Zealand =

European rabbits (Oryctolagus cuniculus) were first introduced to New Zealand in the 1830s. They are found in most areas of New Zealand, and are considered to be one of the worst ecological and agricultural pests in the country.

== History ==
Rabbits were commonly brought upon ships for their meat and fur. Rabbits were introduced by Captain Cook in 1777 in an island in the Queen Charlotte Sound / Tōtaranui. Rabbits were first introduced to the mainland New Zealand in the 1830s. They were released in Blenheim in 1858 and 1865. Silver grey rabbits were released near Kaikōura around 1862. Rabbits entered Wairarapa in 1863 but were slowed by a parasitic intestinal disease, coccidiosis, in the 1880s. In the early 1900s the rabbits spread to Hawke's Bay, and it was only until 1946 when they reached Taranaki and the far north.

=== Culling efforts ===
Rabbit boards were established for the purpose of destruction of rabbits in a specific area, these were created by local authorities under the 1919–1920 Rabbit Nuisance Act. In the 1970s most rabbit boards amalgamated to become larger pest control boards under the 1967 Agricultural Pests Destruction Act.

Myxomatosis was introduced in the 1950s but was unsuccessful due to a lack of a suitable spreading organism. A Czech strain of rabbit hemorrhagic disease virus (RHDV1) was illegally introduced in 1997, which the rabbits are becoming immune to. In May 2018 a new strain of rabbit hemorrhagic disease virus was discovered in the South Island and is named RHDV2. This strain is prevalent in Europe and Australia. Two cases of this strain were found in the Bay of Plenty in 2018.

== Rabbit plagues ==
Similar to rabbit plagues in Australia, New Zealand experienced several periods of explosive rabbit population growth. The first started in the 1870s and ended around 1895. There have also been rabbit plagues in the 1920s, 1940s, and late 1980s. The peak of the rabbit plagues in the South Island was in 1895. The spread of rabbits in the South Island was much greater than the North Island because the South Island is much drier, is covered in less forest, and experiences less rainfall than the North Island. The cost of these plagues is estimated to be $50 million, not only due to the costs of maintaining the rabbit populations, but also the ecological effects that the rabbits have caused, which has been described as an "ecological disaster". Areas worst affected by the plagues have never recovered. Alongside burrowing holes, the rabbits have caused the removal of vegetation cover, such as tussocks, grasses and shrubs. This has caused soil erosion from wind and rain.

== Impact ==
Alongside burrowing holes which can make farmland useless, the rabbits cause the removal of vegetation cover, such as tussocks, grasses and shrubs. This has caused soil erosion from wind and rain. They also compete with pasture livestock by eating the best grass.

== Great Easter Bunny Hunt ==
Since the 1990s an annual rabbit culling competition has been held near Alexandra.
