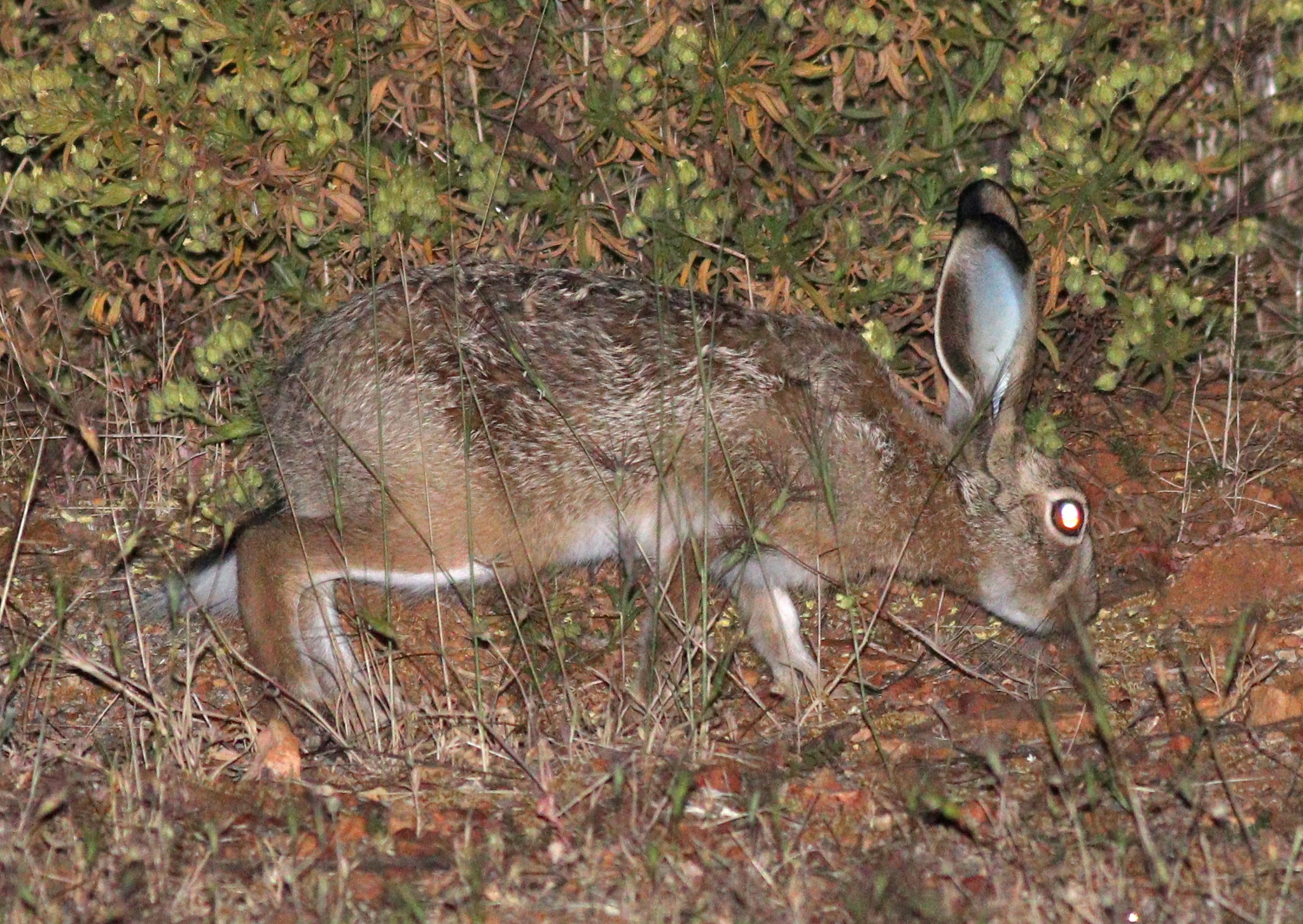
- Granada, Spain

Conservation status
- Least Concern (IUCN 3.1)

Scientific classification
- Kingdom: Animalia
- Phylum: Chordata
- Class: Mammalia
- Order: Lagomorpha
- Family: Leporidae
- Genus: Lepus
- Species: L. granatensis

Binomial name
- Lepus granatensis Rosenhauer, 1856
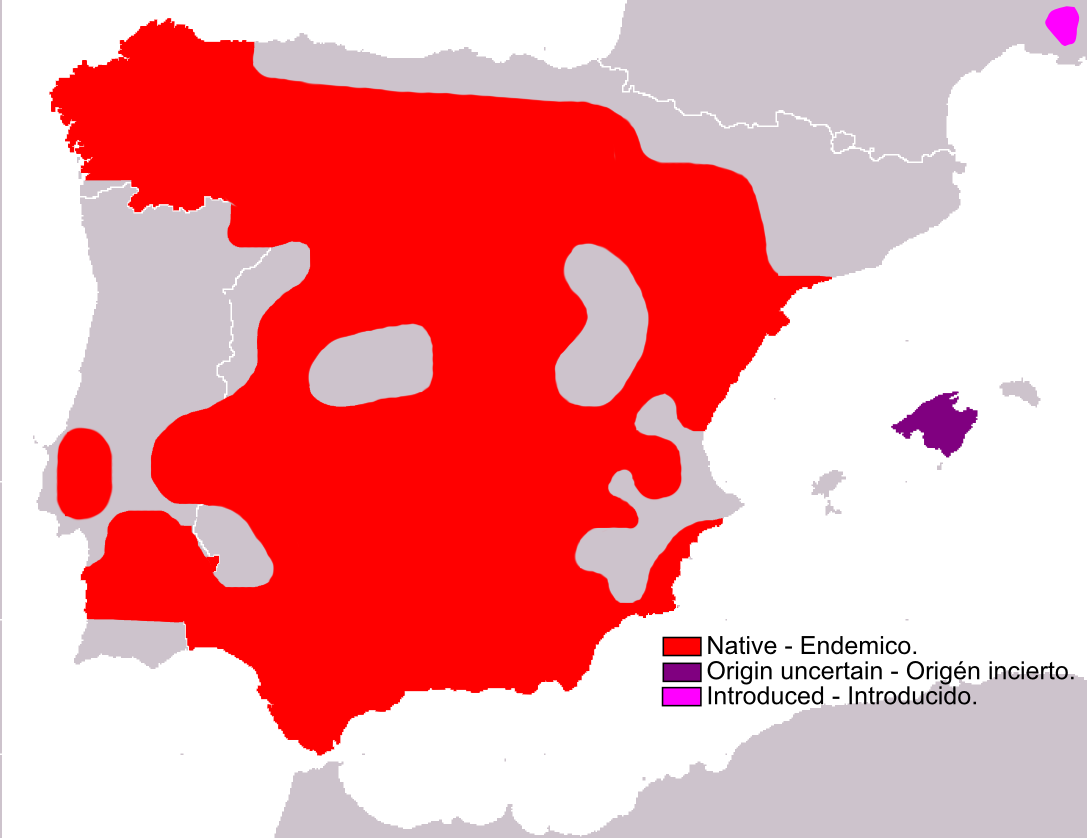
- Granada hare range (red - native, pink - introduced, violet - origin uncertain)

= Granada hare =

Species of mammal

The Granada hare (Lepus granatensis), also known as the Iberian hare (Spanish: liebre Ibérica), is a species of hare that is endemic to the Iberian Peninsula and the island of Mallorca. A small species compared to other European hares, it has long been hunted as an important game species.

== Taxonomy ==
Three subspecies of the Granada hare are known:

- Lepus granatensis granatensis is the most abundant and nominate subspecies, found in Andalusia, Extremadura, Meseta Central, Valencia and the south of Aragon and Catalonia. It is the only subspecies present in Portugal.
- Lepus granatensis gallaecius described by Gerrit Smith Miller Jr. in 1907 was a male adult hare collected in the Province of A Coruña. This subspecies with a darker coat occurs in the northwest of the Iberian Peninsula, in Galicia.
- Lepus granatensis solisi, also called the Majorcan hare, is native to Mallorca and Ibiza in the Balearic Islands. This subspecies was described by biologists Fernando Palacios Arribas and José Fernández López in 1992, who noted its overall smaller size and differing dental morphology from the nominate subspecies. It is considered either critically endangered by some zoologists or extinct by the IUCN.

The Granada hare has been noted as having high genetic diversity.

== Description ==
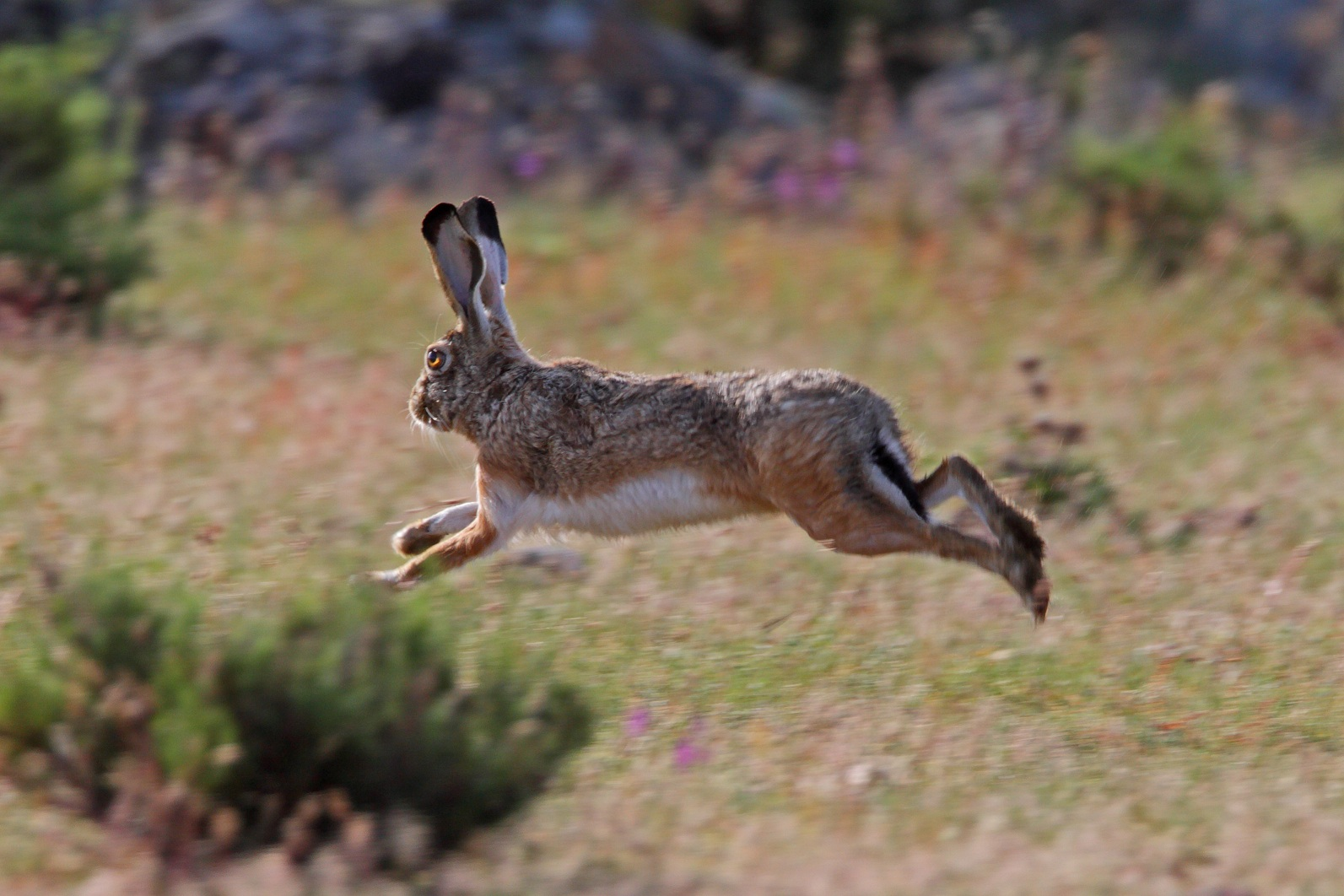
Near La Cañada Observatory, Ávila, Spain

The Granada hare is a hare of average adult weight 2–2.6 kilograms (4.4–5.7 lb) with distinctive reddish outer legs and a clear contrast between the gray-brown fur of its back and the white of its underside and inner legs. This white colouration travels to the tips of the toes. It is smaller than the broom hares (L. castroviejoi) and European hares (L. europaeus) that also occupy the Iberian peninsula, having a head and body length of 44.5 to 47.3 centimetres (17.5 to 18.6 in), hind foot length of 11.66 to 12.74 cm (4.59 to 5.02 in), and ear length of 9.25 to 10.27 cm (3.64 to 4.04 in). The species has some degree of sexual dimorphism, with females being heavier on average when compared to males.

== Behaviour and ecology ==
Females will produce 2 young in each litter on average, though litters as large as 7 leverets have been recorded.

It may be parasitized by Taenia pisiformis, a tapeworm, as well as coccidiosis-causing parasites in the genus Eimeria. These parasites have marked effects on the host hare's escape ability, with negative effects increasing with parasite quantity and variety. Many other parasites are known to affect the Granada hare, including those in genera Ixodes, Spilopsyllus, Mosgovoyia, Trichostrongylus, Graphidium, Nematodiroides, Passalurus, Micipsella, Hyalomma, Haemaphysalis, Rhipicephalus, Haemodipsus, Linguatula, and Dicrocoelium. It has never been found to contract European brown hare syndrome, though it is susceptible to some strains of rabbit hemorrhagic disease virus known since the 1990s. It may also develop bacterial infections, such as tularemia.
