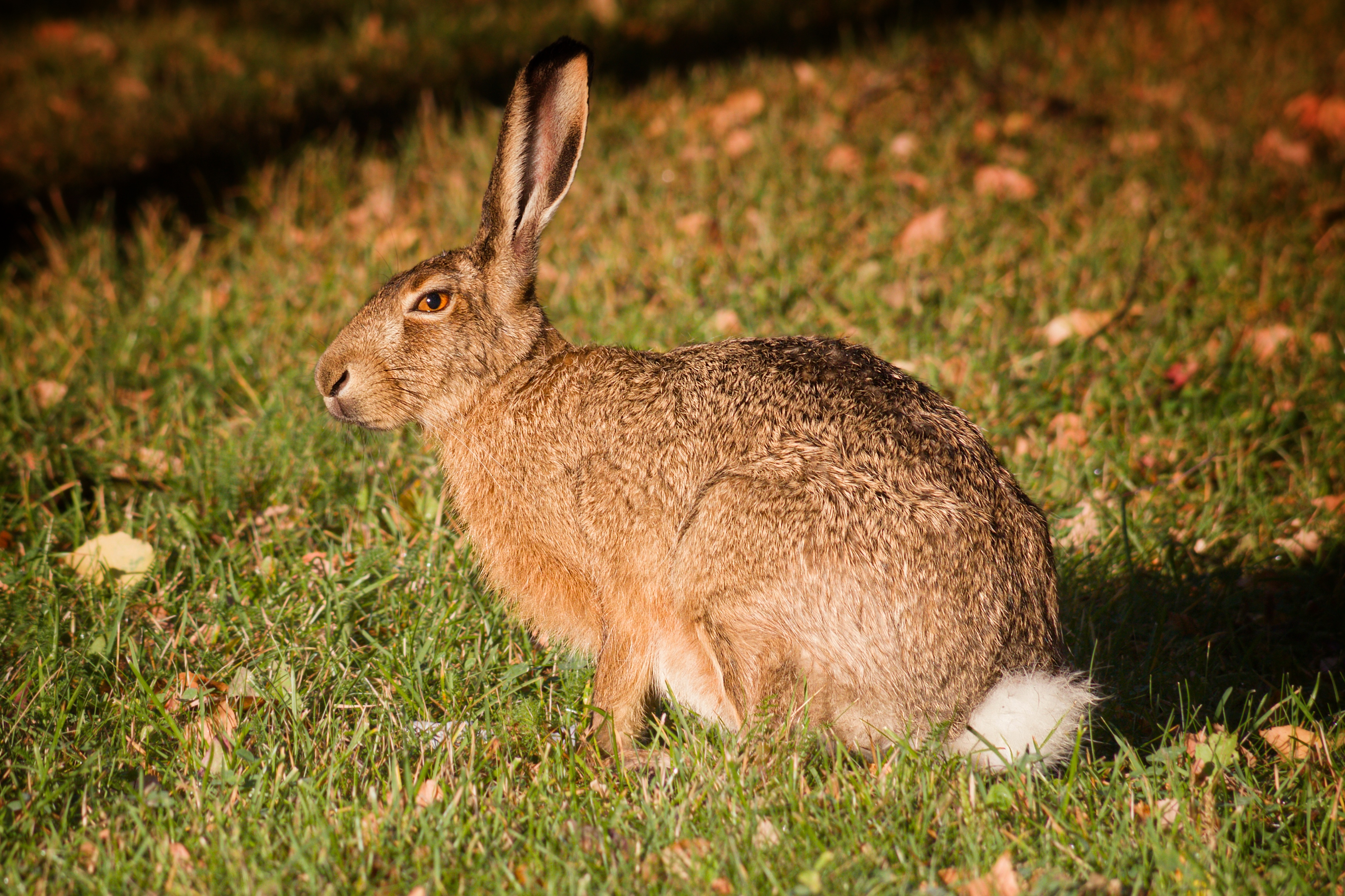

Conservation status
- Least Concern (IUCN 3.1)

Scientific classification
- Kingdom: Animalia
- Phylum: Chordata
- Class: Mammalia
- Order: Lagomorpha
- Family: Leporidae
- Genus: Lepus
- Species: L. europaeus

Binomial name
- Lepus europaeus Pallas, 1778
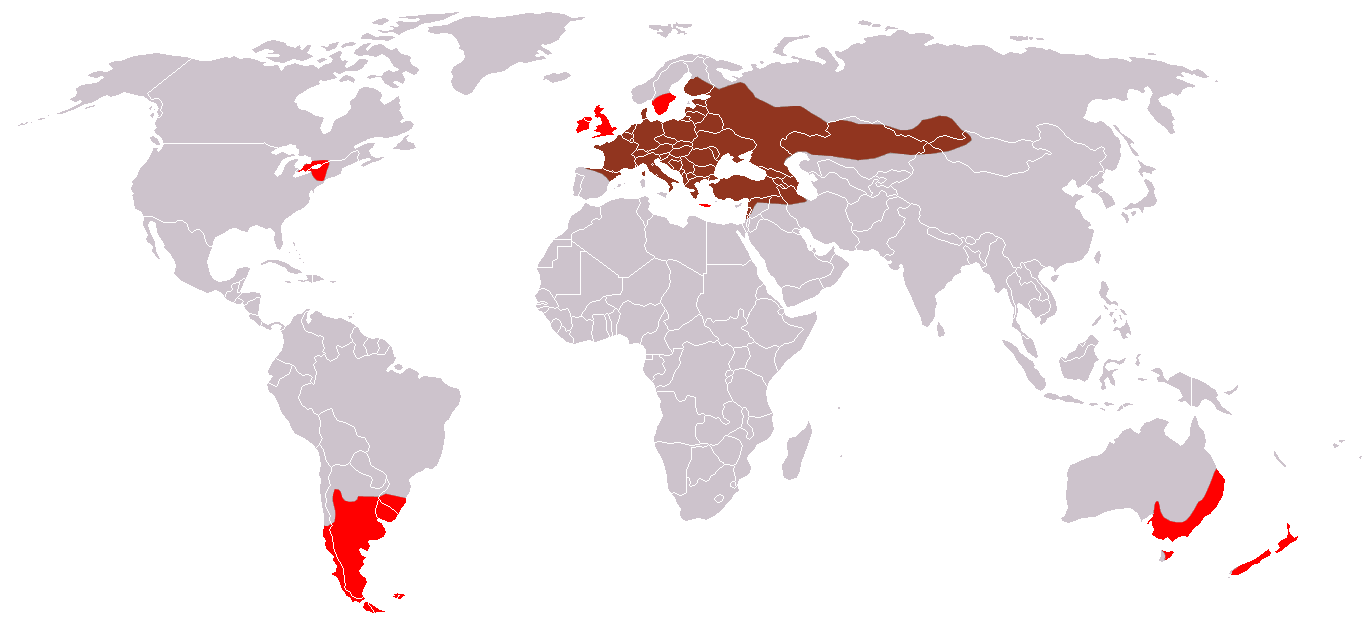
- European hare range (dark red – native, red – introduced)

= European hare =

European hare Temporal range: Pleistocene–recent 0.774–0 Ma

Large species of hare native to Europe and parts of Asia

The European hare (Lepus europaeus), also known as the brown hare, is a species of hare native to Europe and parts of Asia. It is among the largest hare species and is adapted to temperate, open country. Hares are herbivorous and feed mainly on grasses and herbs, supplementing these with twigs, buds, bark and field crops, particularly in winter. Their natural predators include red foxes and large birds of prey. They rely on high-speed endurance running to escape predation, having long, powerful limbs and large nostrils.

Generally nocturnal and shy in nature, hares change their behaviour in the spring, when they can be seen in broad daylight chasing one another around in fields. During this spring frenzy they sometimes strike one another with their paws ("boxing"). This is not just competition between males: females may also hit males, either to show they are not ready to mate or to test the males' determination. The female nests in a depression on the surface of the ground known as a form rather than in a burrow, and the young are active as soon as they are born. Litters may consist of three or four young and a female can bear three litters a year, with hares living for up to twelve years. The breeding season lasts from January to August.

The European hare is listed as being of least concern by the International Union for Conservation of Nature because it has a wide range and is moderately abundant. However populations have been declining in mainland Europe since the 1960s, at least partly due to changes in farming practices. The hare has been hunted across Europe for centuries, with more than five million being shot each year; in Britain it has traditionally been hunted by beagling and hare coursing, but these field sports are now illegal (though illegal hare-coursing continues). The hare is a traditional symbol of fertility and reproduction in some cultures and its courtship behaviour in the spring inspired the English idiom mad as a March hare. Female hares are known as does, while juveniles are leverets.

== Taxonomy and genetics ==
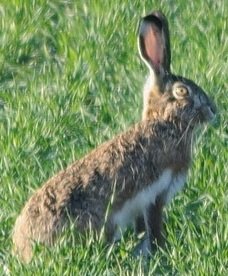
The Granada hare (Lepus granatensis) was once considered a subspecies of the European hare

The European hare was first described in 1778 by German zoologist Peter Simon Pallas. It shares the genus Lepus (Latin for "hare") with 32 other hare and jackrabbit species, jackrabbits being the name given to some species of hare native to North America. They are distinguished from other leporids (hares and rabbits) by their longer legs and wider nostrils. The Corsican hare, broom hare and Granada hare were at one time considered to be subspecies of the European hare, but DNA sequencing and morphological analysis support their status as separate species.

There is some debate as to whether the European hare and the Cape hare are the same species. A 2005 nuclear gene pool study suggested that they are, but a 2006 study of the mitochondrial DNA of these same animals concluded that they had diverged enough to be considered separate species. A 2008 study claims that in the case of Lepus species, with their rapid evolution, cannot be separated based on mtDNA alone but should also include data from the nuclear gene pool. It has been speculated that in the Near East, hare populations are interbreeding and experiencing gene flow. Despite this interbreeding, the Cape hare is still considered a distinct species, albeit one with controversial genetic relationships to other African hares. Leandro Iraçabal and colleagues conducted a study of several mitochondrial and nuclear genes across nearly all lagomorph species in 2024 that placed the Cape hare in a separate clade from the European hare, and indicated that the European hare's closest genetic relative was the Abyssinian hare found in the Horn of Africa:

- part of Lepus genus
  - - - - Lepus europaeus
        - Lepus habessinicus
      - Lepus granatensis
    - - - Lepus hainanus
        - Lepus peguensis
      - Lepus nigricollis
  - - Lepus comus
    - Lepus oiostolus

Cladogenetic analysis suggests that European hares survived the last glacial period during the Pleistocene via refugia in southern Europe (Italian Peninsula and Balkans) and Asia Minor. Subsequent colonisations of central Europe appear to have been followed by human-caused environmental changes. A study of hares in the North Rhine-Westphalia region of Germany, found high genetic diversity with no signs of inbreeding. Gene flow appears tends to be carried more though males, but overall populations are split via maternal lines. However, it is possible that restricted gene flow could reduce genetic diversity within populations that become isolated. The oldest fossil records of the European hare are found in Italy and Romania, and may date back 0.774 million years ago; this aligns with time estimates for the species' genetic divergence from its closest relative, the Abyssinian hare, in the late Pleistocene.

Historically, up to 30 subspecies of European hare have been described, although their status has been disputed. These subspecies have been distinguished by differences in pelage colour, body size and measurements, skull morphology and tooth shape.

Sixteen subspecies are listed in the IUCN red book, following Hoffmann and Smith (2005):

- Lepus europaeus caspicus
- L. e. connori
- L. e. creticus
- L. e. cyprius
- L. e. cyrensis
- L. e. europaeus
- L. e. hybridus
- L. e. judeae
- L. e. karpathorum
- L. e. medius
- L. e. occidentalis
- L. e. parnassius
- L. e. ponticus
- L. e. rhodius
- L. e. syriacus
- L. e. transsylvanicus

Twenty-nine subspecies of "very variable status" are listed by Chapman and Flux in their book on lagomorphs, including the subspecies above (with the exceptions of L. e. connori, L. e. creticus, L. e. cyprius, L. e. judeae, L. e. rhodius, and L. e. syriacus) and additionally:

- L. e. alba
- L. e. argenteogrisea
- L. e. biarmicus
- L. e. borealis
- L. e. caspicus
- L. e. caucasicus
- L. e. flavus
- L. e. gallaecius
- L. e. hispanicus
- L. e. hyemalis
- L. e. granatensis
- L. e. iturissius
- L. e. kalmykorum
- L. e. meridiei
- L. e. meridionalis
- L. e. niethammeri
- L. e. niger
- L. e. tesquorum
- L. e. tumak

== Description ==
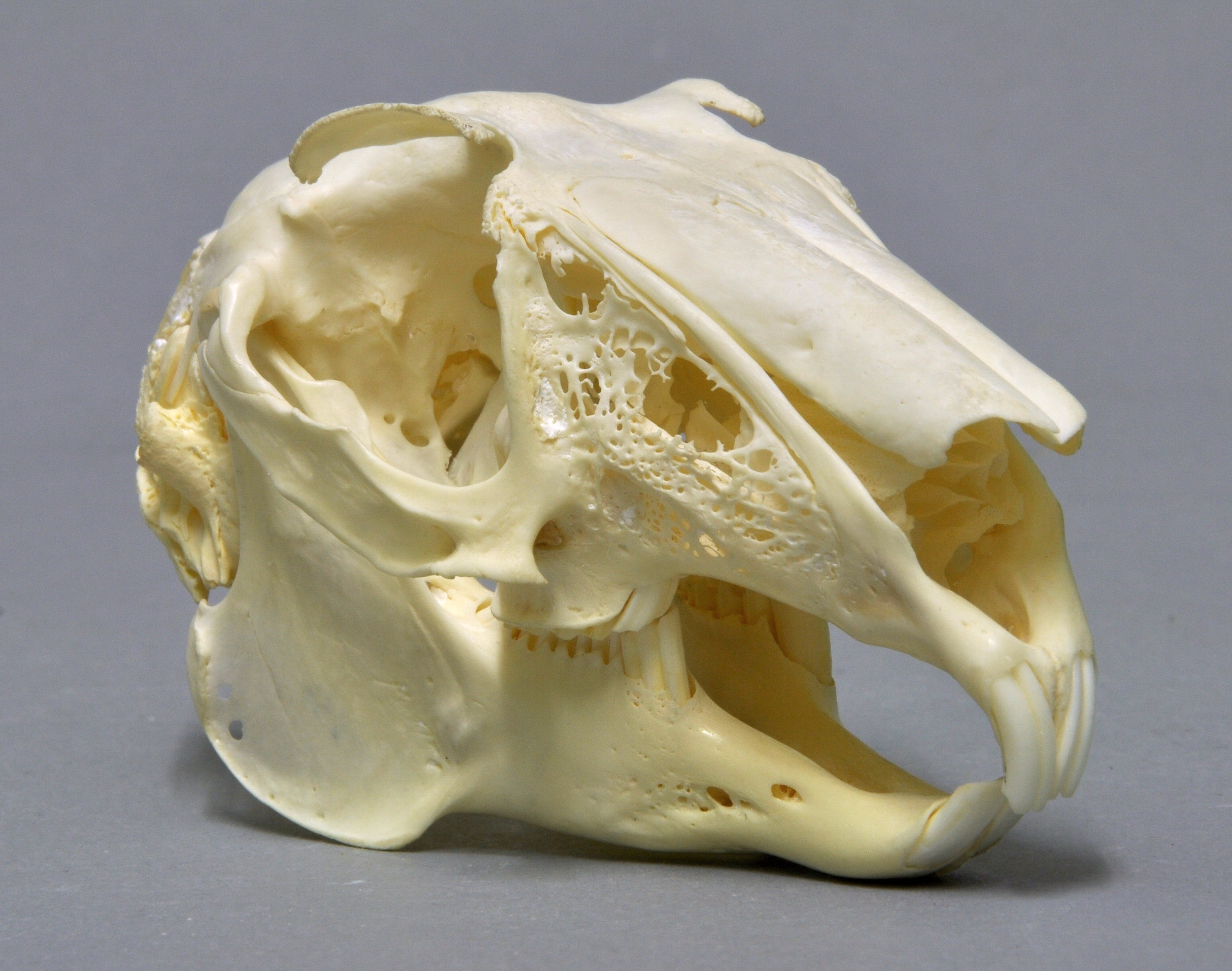
Hare skull

The European hare, like other members of the family Leporidae, is a fast-running terrestrial mammal. It is the largest of the hares native to Europe, being 55 to 65 cm (22 to 26 in) long from head to body with 7.5–14 cm (3.0–5.5 in) tail and weighing 3.5–5 kg (7.7–11.0 lb). The hare's elongated ears range from 9.4 to 11.0 cm (3.7 to 4.3 in) from the notch to the tip. It also has long hind feet that have a length of between 14 and 16 cm (5.5 and 6.3 in). The dental formula is 2/1, 0/0, 3/2, 3/3.

The European hare is slenderer than the European rabbit, and its dark limb musculature gives it great stamina when running at high speeds in open country. By contrast, cottontail rabbits are built for short sprints in more vegetated habitats. Other adaptions for endurance running include wider nostrils and larger hearts. In comparison to the European rabbit, the hare has a proportionally smaller stomach and caecum.

Grizzled yellow-brown fur covers the back and becomes rufous on the shoulders, legs, neck and throat and white on the underside and black on the tail and ear tips. The fur on the back is typically longer and more curled than on the rest of the body. The European hare's fur mostly remains the same throughout the year, although the sides of the head and base of the ears do develop white areas and the hip and rump region may gain some grey.

== Distribution and habitat ==
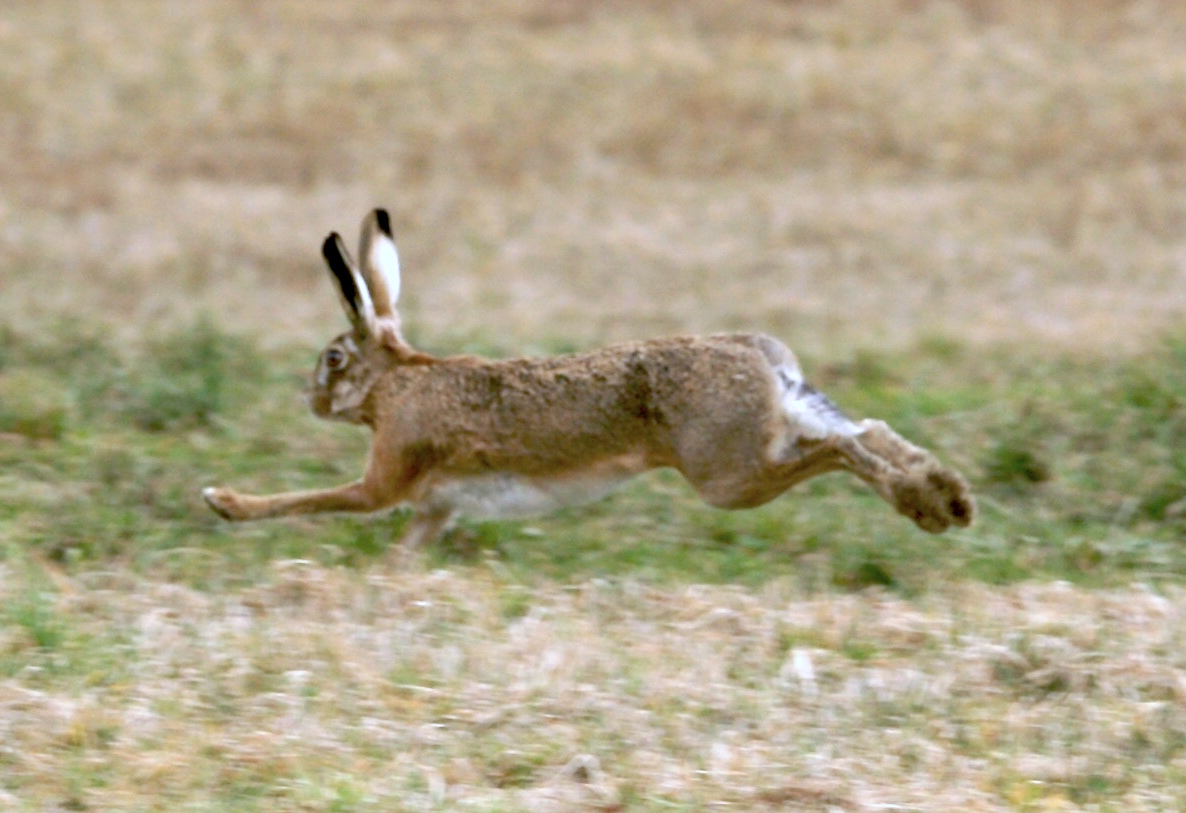
Hare running in open field

The European hare is native to much of continental Europe, reaching as far north as 60N, and as far east as Central Asia. It has also been introduced, mostly as game animal, to North America in Ontario and New York State, and unsuccessfully in Pennsylvania, Massachusetts, and Connecticut, the Southern Cone in Brazil, Argentina, Uruguay, Paraguay, Bolivia, Chile, Peru and the Falkland Islands, Australia (including Tasmania), both islands of New Zealand, the south Pacific coast of Russia, and Ireland.

The European hare primarily lives in open fields and shelter in scattered vegetation. It is a versatile species and thrives in mixed farmland. In its native steppe habitat, European hare populations are spread apart; they average roughly 2 individuals per 100 hectares. Conversely, population densities of up to 275 hares per 100 hectares are seen in milder climates. According to a study in the Czech Republic, hares are most numerous at areas with below 200 m (660 ft) above sea level, and an average temperature 10 °C (50 °F) throughout the year. With regards to climate, the European hare density was highest in "warm and dry districts with mild winters". In Poland, the European hare is most abundant in areas with few forest edges, perhaps because foxes can use these for cover. It requires cover, such as hedges, ditches and permanent cover areas, because these habitats supply the varied diet it requires, and are found at lower densities in large open fields. High cultivation results in greater mortality of young hares.

=== In Great Britain ===
Although long believed to have been introduced to Britain by the Romans during the 1st century CE, multiple lines of physical, genetic, and radiocarbon evidence have revised this timeline, establishing that the European hare arrived during the middle-to-late Iron Age (between the 5th and 3rd centuries BCE). Genetic molecular clock analyses indicate that the British population possesses very low genetic diversity and clusters tightly within modern Danish and Dutch branches, reflecting a shallow evolutionary divergence inconsistent with a natural, post-glacial migration across the Doggerland land bridge. Instead, a small number of wild-caught animals were transported across the North Sea or English Channel via maritime trade networks and liberated into the landscape, which had recently been deforested into open, patchy agricultural fields ideal for steppe wildlife.

Early zooarchaeological evidence indicates that these introduced hares held a complex cultural status. Skeletons from Iron Age contexts show no signs of butcher or skinning marks and were frequently found buried intact and fully articulated, suggesting they were treated as treasured exotica or sacred objects rather than a food source. This material reality aligns with the observations of Julius Caesar in his Commentarii de Bello Gallico, where he noted that the British tribes considered it a religious taboo to consume hares, though they reared them for pleasure and amusement. While Roman accounts likely oversimplified or misinterpreted the exact theological reasoning behind the behavior, the lack of butchered refuse confirms the behavioral taboo existed. Following the Roman conquest of Britain in 43 CE, this cultural taboo broke down; the archaeological record shifts dramatically, with hare bones appearing in domestic refuse heaps showing standard butchery marks alongside evidence of commercial intensive farming in walled enclosures (leporaria).

Although European hares are shot as game when plentiful in contemporary Great Britain, this is a self-limiting activity and is less likely to occur in localities where the species is scarce.

== Behaviour and life history ==
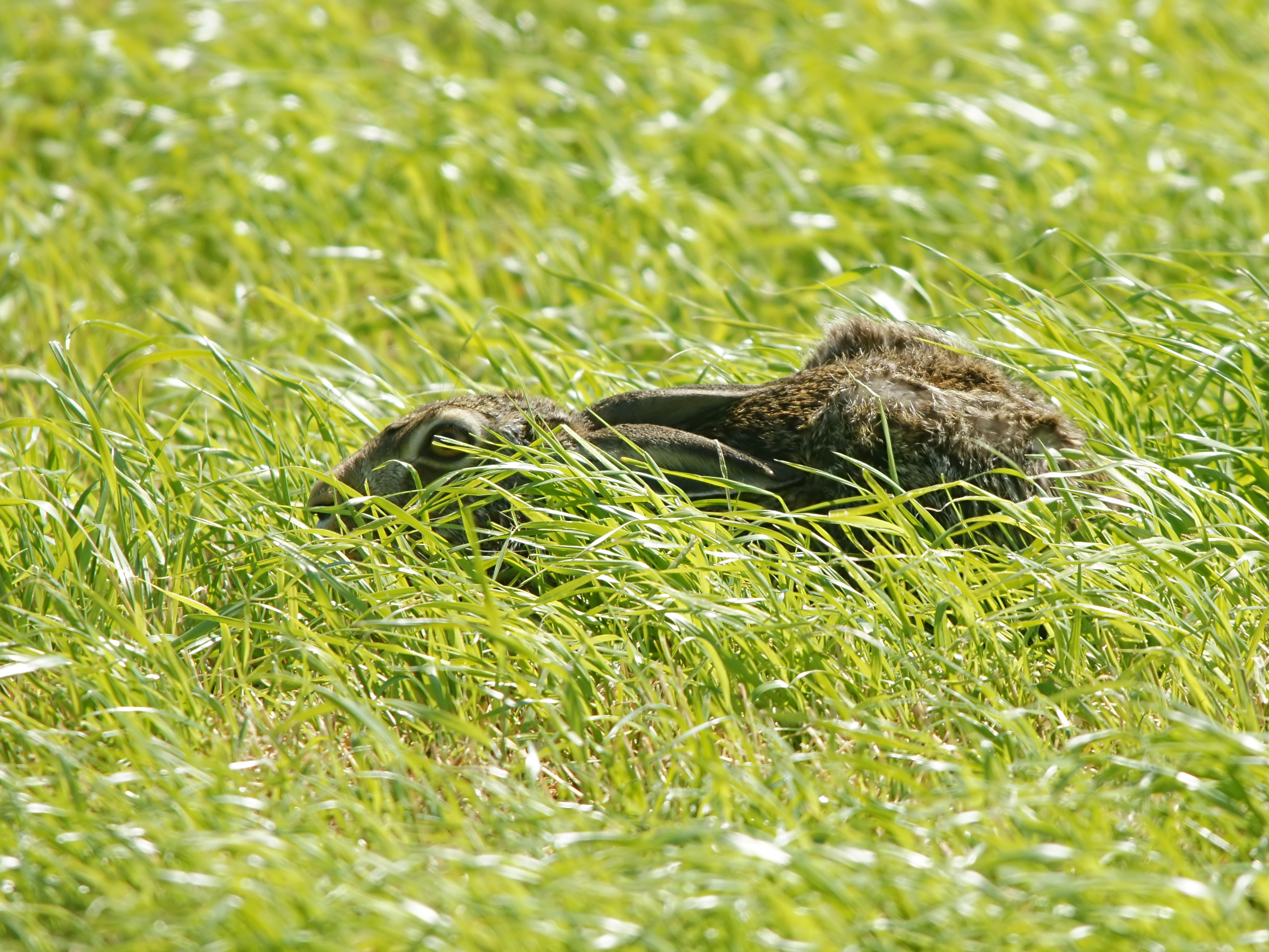
European hare hiding in a "form"

The European hare is primarily nocturnal and spends a third of its activity foraging. During daytime, it hides in a depression in the ground called a "form" where it is partially hidden. It can run at 70 km/h (43 mph), and when confronted by predators it relies on outrunning them in the open. It is generally thought of as asocial but can be seen in both large and small groups. It does not appear to be territorial, living in overlapping home ranges of around 300 ha (740 acres). Communication between hares is by a variety of visual signals. Interest is shown by raising ears, while lowering ears warns others to keep away. When challenging another individual, a hare thumps its front feet; the hind feet are used to warn others of a predator. It squeals when hurt or scared, and a female makes "guttural" calls to attract her young. A hare can live for 8–13 years.

=== Food and foraging ===
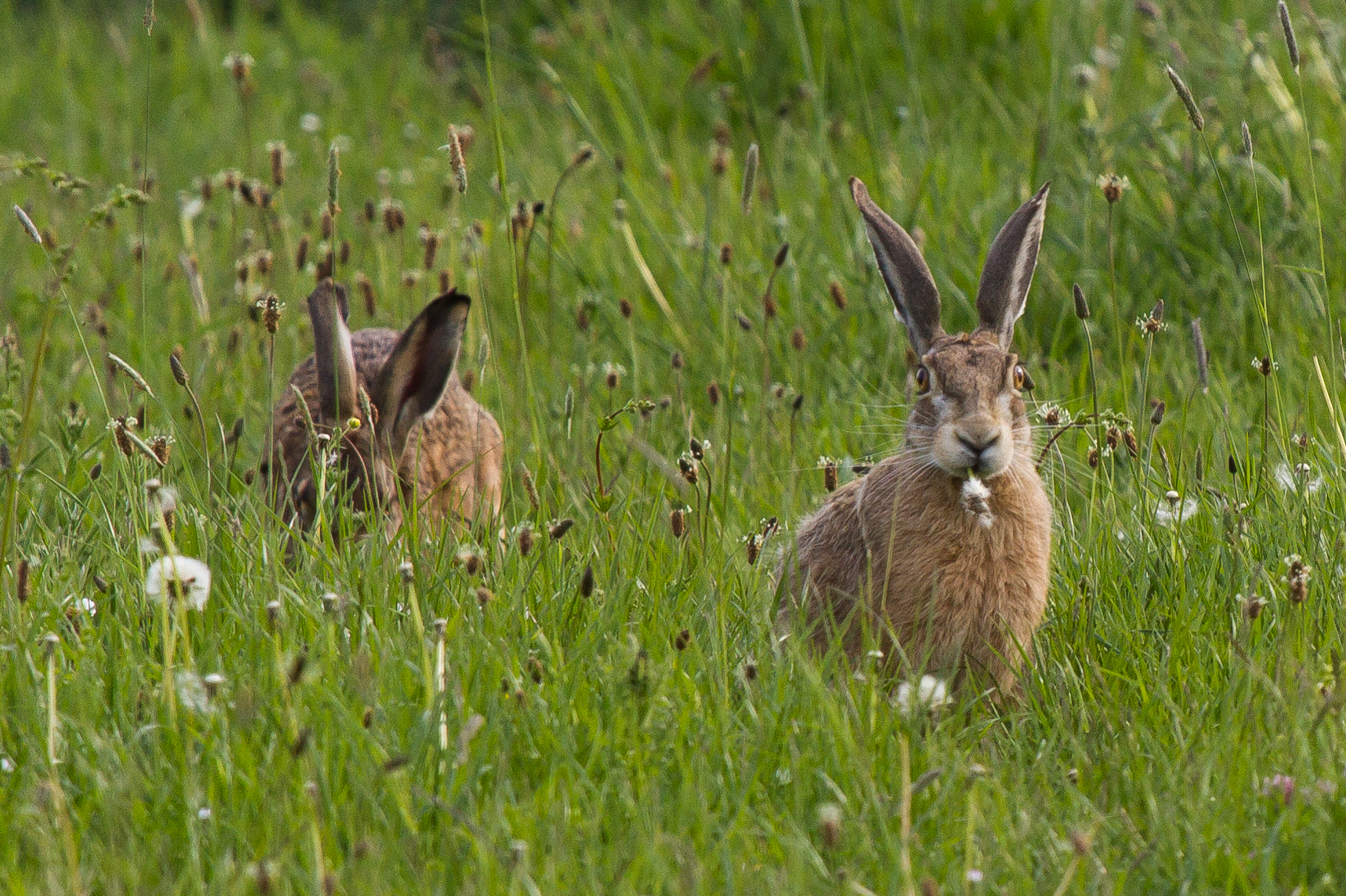
Hares feeding in a small group

The European hare is primarily herbivorous and forages for wild grasses and weeds. With the intensification of agriculture, it has taken to feeding on crops when preferred foods are not available. During the spring and summer it feeds on soy, clover and corn poppy as well as grasses and herbs. During autumn and winter, it primarily chooses winter wheat, and is also lured by hunters with piles of sugar beet and carrots. It also eats woody material from shrubs and young fruit trees during winter. It avoids cereal crops when other more attractive foods are available, and appears to prefer high-energy fats and proteins over dietary fiber. When eating twigs, it strips off the bark to feed on the vascular tissues for their soluble carbohydrates. Compared to the European rabbit, food passes through the gut more rapidly in the European hare, although digestion rates are similar. It is sometimes eats its own faeces to recover undigested proteins and vitamins. The consumption rate of two or three hares can equal that of a single sheep.

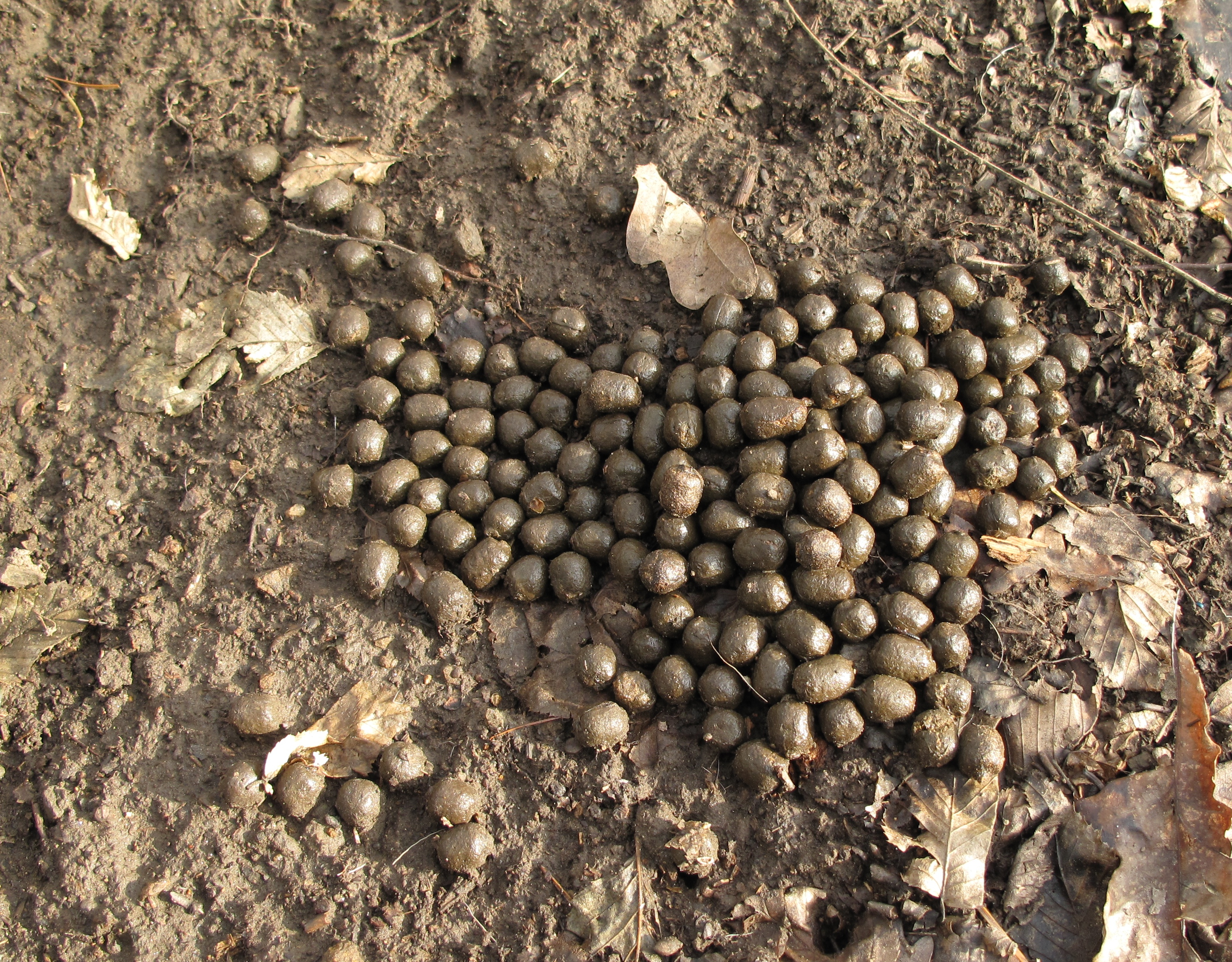
Faecal pellets

European hares forage in groups. Group feeding is beneficial as individuals can spend more time feeding knowing that other hares are being vigilant. Nevertheless, the distribution of food affects these benefits. When food is well-spaced, all hares are able to access it. When food is more concentrated, only dominant hares can access it. In small gatherings, dominants are more successful in defending food, but as more individuals join in, they must spend more time driving off others. The larger the group, the less time dominant individuals have in which to eat. Meanwhile, the subordinates can access the food while the dominants are distracted. As such, when in groups, all individuals fare worse the more concentrated the food is.

=== Mating and reproduction ===
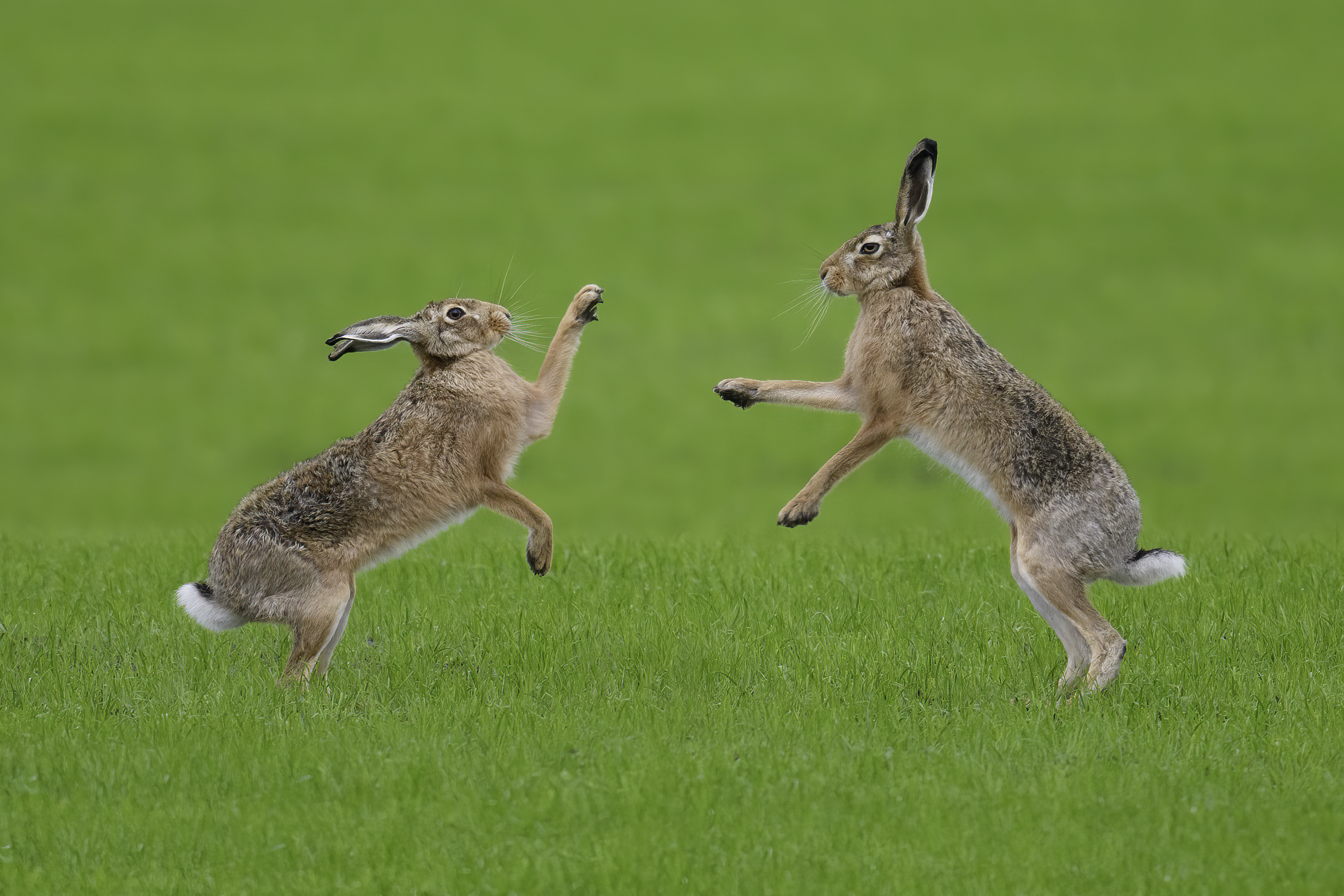

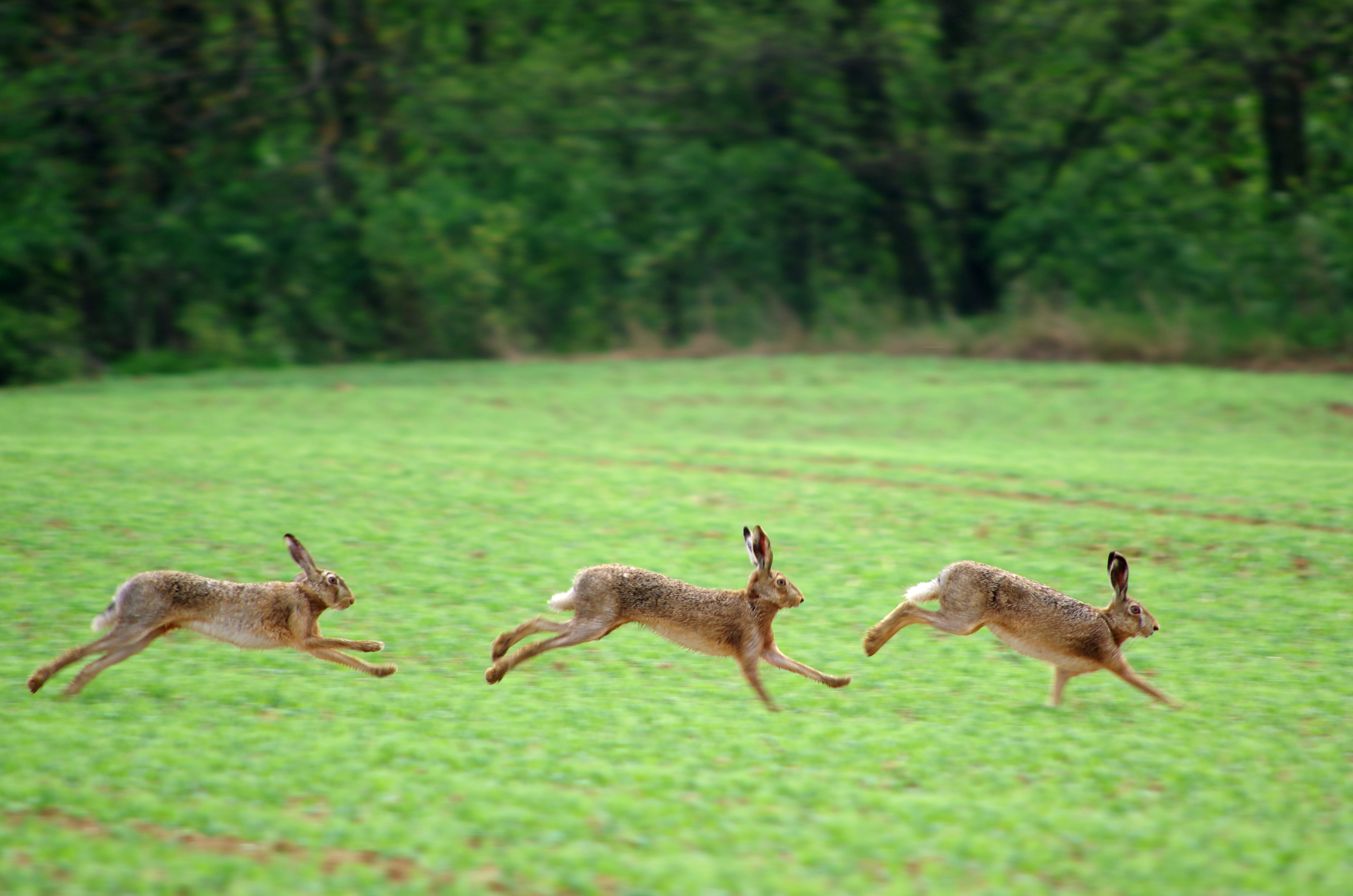
Fighting, and running during "March madness"

European hares have an extended breeding season which lasts from January to August. During this time, females, or does, are fertile while males, or bucks, are fertile outside of October and November. After a reproductive low in October, the males' testes enlarge and become more active. They gain back functionality during December, January and February. Matings start before ovulation occurs with the earliest pregnancy usually producing only single foetus, and there are numerous miscarriages. Peak reproductive activity occurs in March and April, when all females may be pregnant, the majority with three or more foetuses.

The mating system of the hare has been described as both polygynous (single males mating with multiple females) and promiscuous. Females have six-weekly reproductive cycles and are receptive for only a few hours at a time, making competition among local bucks intense. At the height of the breeding season, this phenomenon is known as "March madness", when the normally nocturnal bucks are forced to be active in the daytime. In addition to dominant animals subduing subordinates, the female fights off her numerous suitors if she is not ready to mate. Fights can be vicious and can leave numerous scars on the ears. In these encounters, hares stand upright and attack each other with their paws, a practice known as "boxing", and this activity is often between a female and a male and not between competing males as was previously believed. When the time is right, the doe runs across the countryside, starting a chase that tests the stamina of the following males. She stops to mate only when one male remains. Female fertility lasts through May, June and July, but testosterone production decreases in males and sexual behaviour becomes less noticeable. Litter sizes decrease as the breeding season draws to a close with no females pregnant after August. The testes of males reduce in size at this time, and by the next month sperm production ends.

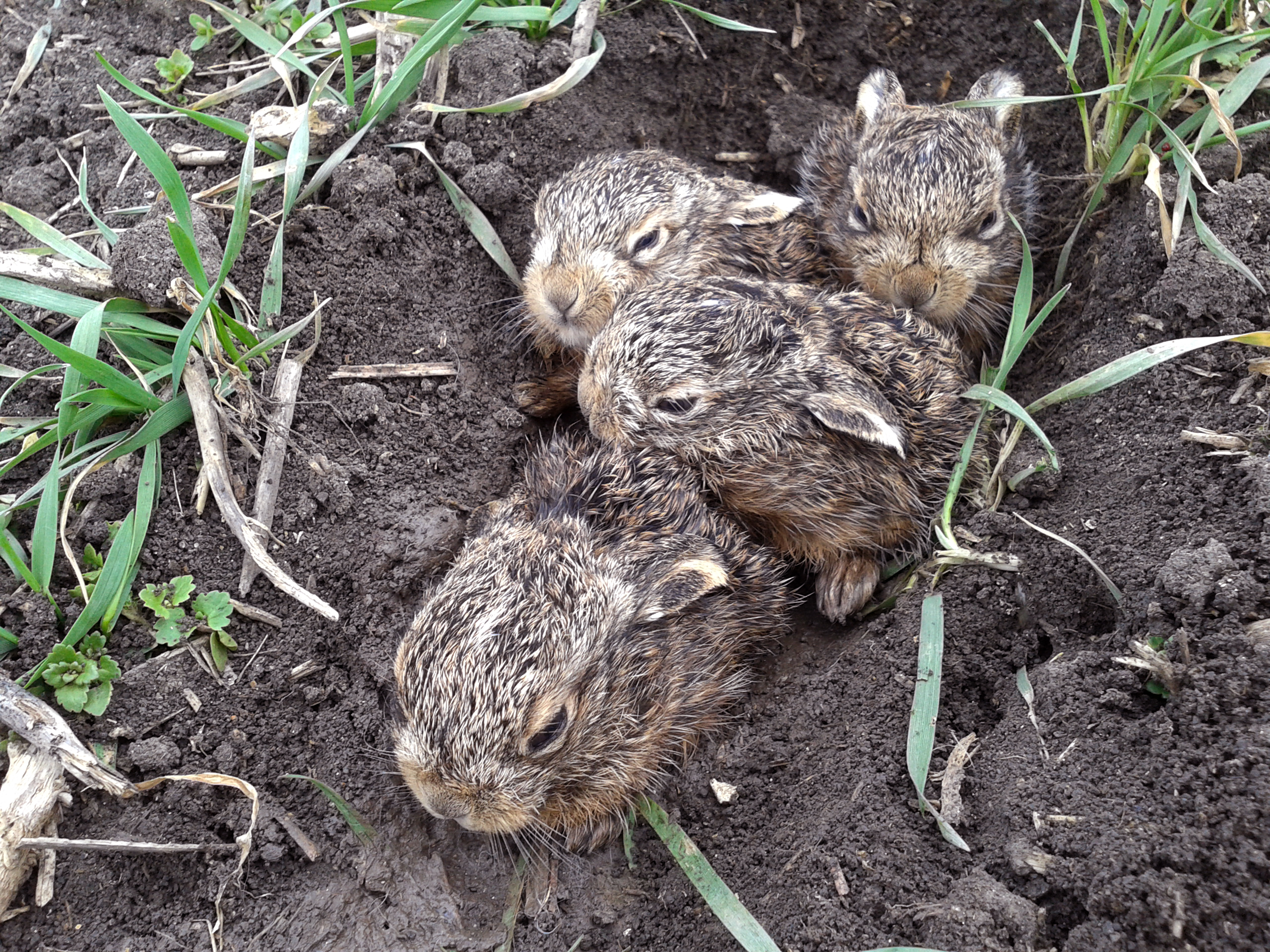
Newborn leverets in a depression

Does give birth in depressions that they dig into the ground. An individual female may have two to four litters in a year after a six-week gestation period. One litter can consist of up to ten young or leverets, which have an average weight of around 130 grams (4.6 oz) at birth. They are born fully furred and are precocial, being ready to leave the nest soon after they are born, an adaptation to the lack of physical protection relative to that afforded by a burrow. Leverets disperse during the day and come together in the evening close to where they were born. Their mother visits them for nursing soon after sunset; the young suckle for around five minutes, urinating while they do so, with the doe licking up the fluid. She then leaps away so as not to leave an olfactory trail, and the leverets go their separate ways once more. The young can eat solid food after two weeks and are weaned at three or four weeks old. While young of either sex commonly explore their surroundings, natal dispersal tends to be greater in males. Sexual maturity is reached after 4–8 months.

=== Health and mortality ===
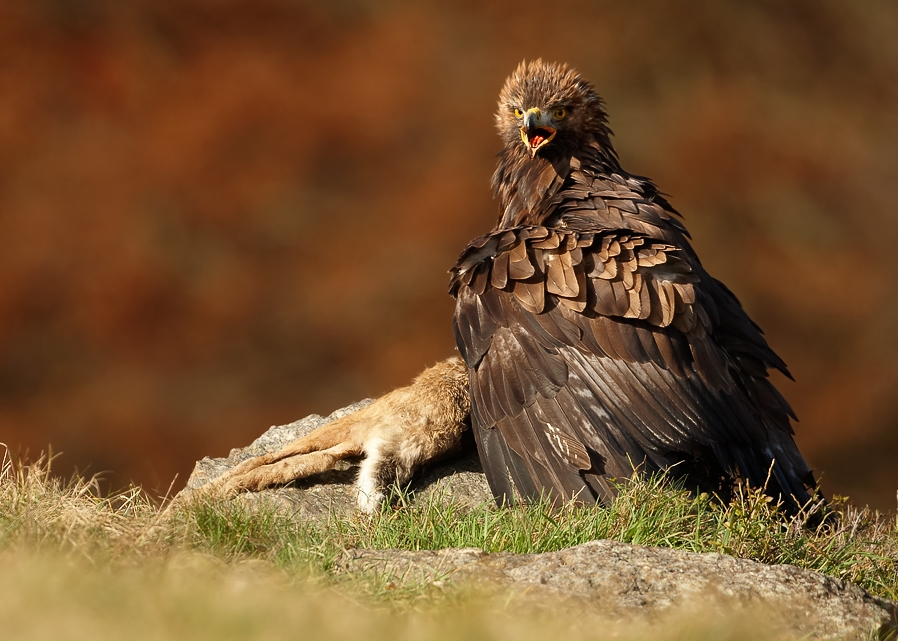
Golden eagle with a freshly caught hare

European hares are preyed on by red foxes, cats, mustelids, snakes and birds of prey. In Poland it was found that predation by foxes peaks during spring, when the availability of small animal prey was low; at this time of year, hares may constitute up to 50% of the biomass in a fox's diet, with 50% of the mortality of adult hares being caused by predation. In Scandinavia a natural epizootic of sarcoptic mange, which reduced the population of red foxes dramatically, resulted in an increase in the number of European hares, which returned to previous levels when the numbers of foxes subsequently increased. Birds as large as goshawks and sparrowhawks can kill adults, while crows and ravens are mainly threats to young. The golden eagle preys on the European hare in the Alps, the Carpathians, the Apennines and northern Spain. In North America foxes and coyotes prey on them and, to a lesser extent, bobcats and Canada lynxes.

European hares have both external and internal parasites. One study found that 54% of animals in Slovakia were parasitised by nematodes and more than 90% by coccidia. In Australia, internal parasites include four species of nematode, six of coccidian, several liver flukes and two canine tapeworms. They were also found to host rabbit fleas (Spilopsyllus cuniculi), stickfast fleas (Echidnophaga myrmecobii), lice (Haemodipsus setoni and H. lyriocephalus), and mites (Leporacarus gibbus).

European brown hare syndrome (EBHS) is a disease caused by a calicivirus similar to that which causes rabbit haemorrhagic disease (RHD) in the European rabbit, but the two species appear to be mutually immune to the other's virus. Other threats to the hare are pasteurellosis, yersiniosis (pseudo-tuberculosis), coccidiosis and tularaemia, which are the principal sources of mortality.

In October 2018, it was reported that a mutated form of the rabbit haemorrhagic disease virus (RHDV2) may have infected hares in the UK. Normally rare in hares, a significant die-off from the virus has also occurred in Spain.

== Relationship with humans ==
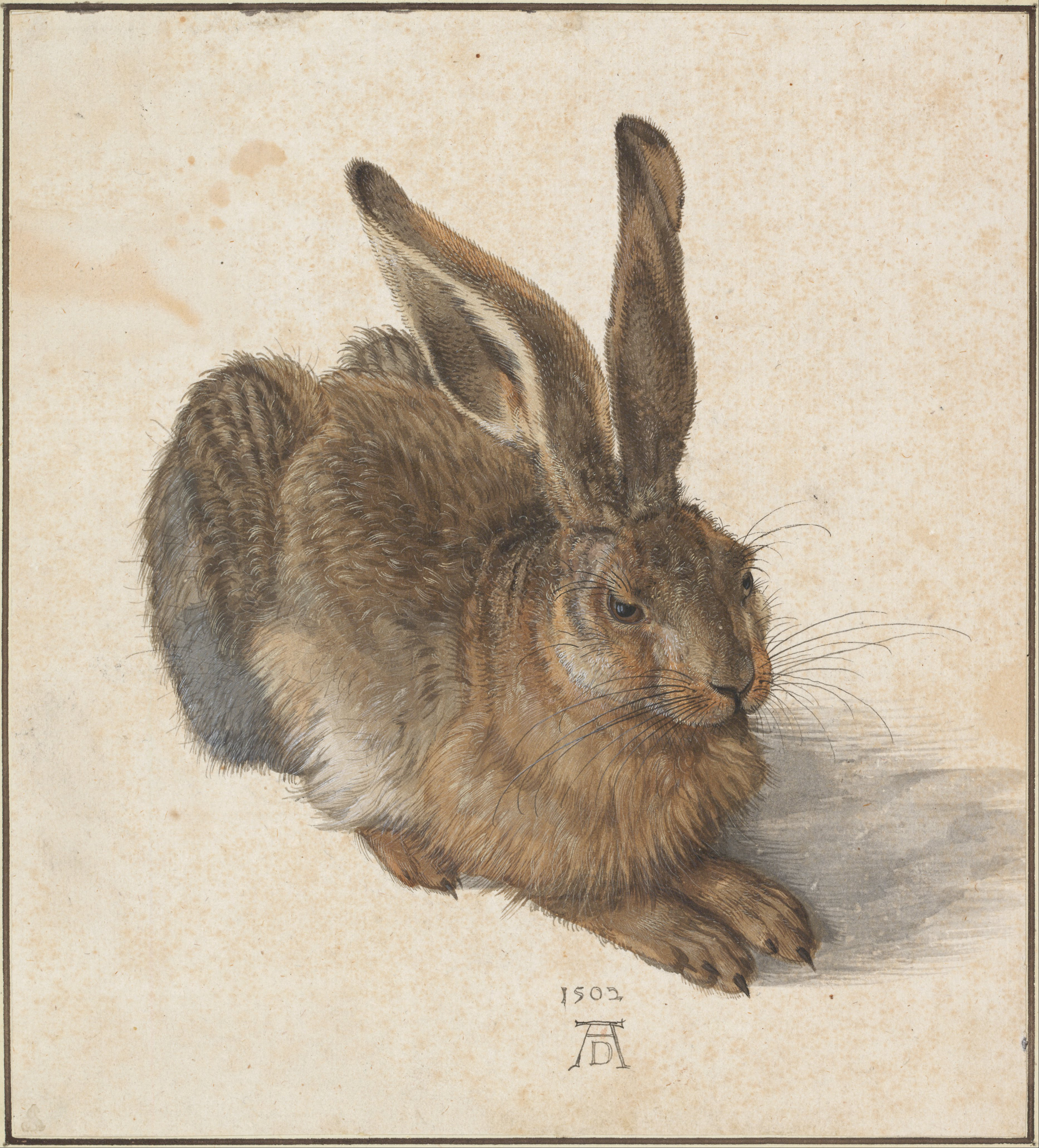
Albrecht Dürer's watercolour Young Hare, 1502

=== In folklore, literature, and art ===
In Europe, the hare has been a symbol of sex and fertility since at least ancient Greece. The Greeks associated it with the gods Dionysus, Aphrodite and Artemis as well as with satyrs and cupids. The Christian Church connected the hare with lustfulness and homosexuality, but also associated it with the persecution of the church because of the way it was commonly hunted.

In northern Europe, Easter imagery often involves hares or rabbits. Citing folk Easter customs in Leicestershire, England, where "the profits of the land called Harecrop Leys were applied to providing a meal which was thrown on the ground at the 'Hare-pie Bank'", the 19th-century scholar Charles Isaac Elton proposed a possible connection between these customs and the worship of Ēostre. In his 19th-century study of the hare in folk custom and mythology, Charles J. Billson cites folk customs involving the hare around Easter in Northern Europe, and argues that the hare was probably a sacred animal in prehistoric Britain's festival of springtime. Observation of the hare's springtime mating behaviour led to the popular English idiom "mad as a March hare", with similar phrases from the sixteenth-century writings of John Skelton and Sir Thomas More onwards. In Alice's Adventures in Wonderland by Lewis Carroll, March Hare appears in a tea-party with the Hatter.

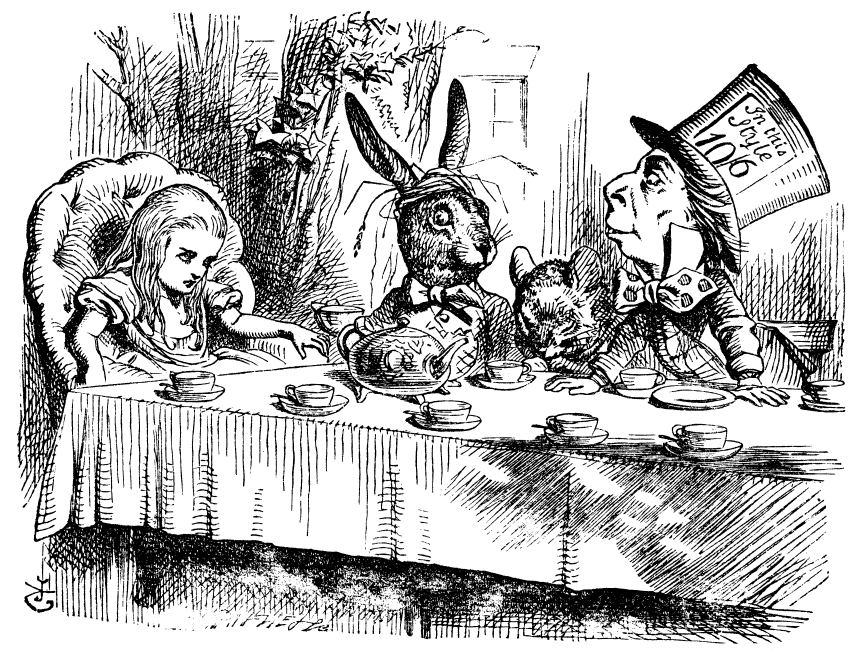
Sir John Tenniel's March Hare with Alice, the Dormouse, and the Hatter from Alice's Adventures in Wonderland, 1865

Any connection of the hare to Ēostre is doubtful. John Andrew Boyle cites an etymology dictionary by Alfred Ernout and Antoine Meillet, who wrote that the lights of Ēostre were carried by hares, that Ēostre represented spring fecundity, love and sexual pleasure. Boyle responds that almost nothing is known about Ēostre, and that the authors had seemingly accepted the identification of Ēostre with the Norse goddess Freyja, but that the hare is not associated with Freyja either. Boyle adds that "when the authors speak of the hare as the 'companion of Aphrodite and of satyrs and cupids' and 'in the Middle Ages [the hare] appears beside the figure of [mythological] Luxuria', they are on much surer ground."

The story was annexed to a philosophical problem by Zeno of Elea, who created a set of paradoxes to support Parmenides' attack on the idea of continuous motion, as each time the hare (or the hero Achilles) moves to where the tortoise was, the tortoise moves just a little further away. The German Renaissance artist Albrecht Dürer realistically depicted a hare in his 1502 watercolour painting Young Hare. The name for juvenile hares, leveret, is first attested to in the 1500s, while the name for female hares, doe, originated later in the 17th century.

=== Food and hunting ===
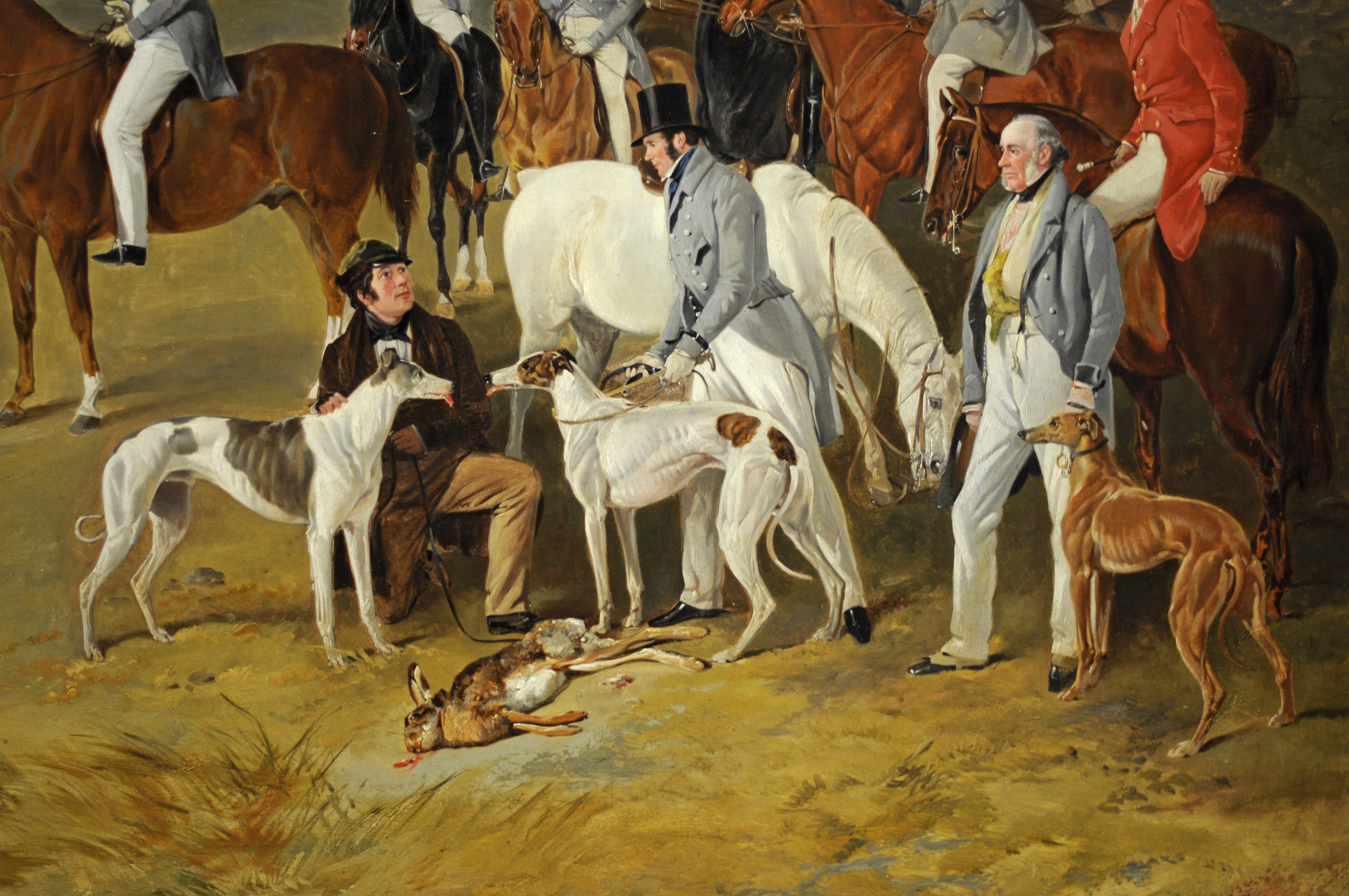
Detail of The Caledonian Coursing Meeting near the Castle of Ardrossan, the Isle of Arran in the Distance by Richard Ansdell, 1844, showing gentlemen on horseback hunting hares with greyhounds

Across Europe, over five million European hares are taken by hunters, making it probably the most important game mammal on the continent. This popularity has threatened regional varieties such as those of France and Denmark, through large-scale importing of hares from Eastern European countries such as Hungary. Hares have traditionally been hunted in Britain by beagling and hare coursing. In beagling, the hare is tracked by a party of small hunting dogs, beagles, followed by the human hunters on foot. In Britain, the 2004 Hunting Act banned hunting of hares with dogs, so the 60 beagle packs now use artificial "trails", or may hunt rabbits instead. Hare coursing with greyhounds was once an aristocratic pursuit, forbidden to lower social classes. More recently, informal hare coursing became a lower-class activity and was conducted without the landowner's permission; it is also now illegal. Despite its illegality, hare coursing continues, often causing damage to agricultural land where hunters trespass into farms in pursuit of a hare. In Scotland concerns have been raised over the rise in numbers of hares shot under license.

Hare is traditionally cooked by jugging: a whole hare is cut into pieces, marinated and cooked slowly with red wine and juniper berries in a tall jug that stands in a pan of water. It is traditionally served with (or briefly cooked with) the hare's blood and port wine. Hare can also be cooked in a casserole. The meat is darker and more strongly flavoured than that of rabbits. Young hares can be roasted; the meat of older hares becomes too tough for roasting, and may be slow-cooked.

== Status ==
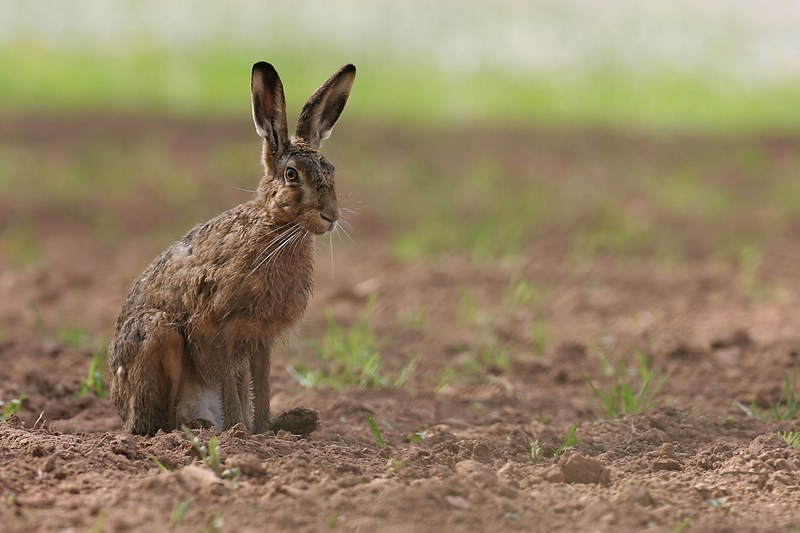
Hare on cultivated ground. The intensification of agricultural practices has caused a decline in their populations.

The International Union for Conservation of Nature has evaluated the European hare's conservation status as being of least concern. However, declines in populations in populations of the species have been noted in many areas since the 1960s. These have been associated with the intensification of agricultural practices, climate change and an increase in predators. Agriculture has created less diverse habitats which the hare prefers. The species has benefited from the establishment of green zones with a more diverse food sources. In France, Spain, and in Greece, the restocking by hares brought from outside the region has been identified as a threat to regional gene pools. To counteract this, Spain began a captive breeding program, and the relocation of some individuals from one location to another has increased genetic variety. The Bern Convention lists the hare under Appendix III as a protected species. Several countries, including Norway, Germany, Austria and Switzerland, have placed the species on their Red Lists as "near threatened" or "threatened".
