= European brown hare syndrome =

Lagovirus europaeus

Virus classification
- (unranked): Virus
- Realm: Riboviria
- Kingdom: Orthornavirae
- Phylum: Pisuviricota
- Class: Pisoniviricetes
- Order: Picornavirales
- Family: Caliciviridae
- Genus: Lagovirus
- Species: Lagovirus europaeus

Synonyms
- European brown hare syndrome virus; Rabbit hemorrhagic disease virus; European brown hare virus

Viral disease affecting hares and rabbits

European brown hare syndrome (EBHS) is a highly contagious viral disease that affects hares and some cottontail rabbits, though it is most frequently found in the European hare (Lepus europaeus). It is caused by the lagovirus known as Lagovirus europaeus, formerly European brown hare syndrome virus (EBHSV).

== History ==
European brown hare syndrome virus was first described in Sweden in the 1980s and was noted as closely related to rabbit hemorrhagic disease (RHD) virus, another calcivirus that causes severe viral hepatitis in European rabbits. A variant of the RHD virus, termed RHDV2, was discovered in the early 2010s that affects both the European rabbit and the European hare.

European brown hare syndrome was first recorded when wild and captive European brown hare (Lepus europaeus) were found dead with diffuse hemorrhagic lesions and liver degeneration. Soon, many more cases were reported from other Scandinavian countries and continental Europe. By the mid 1980s, the intensive spread of the virus led to a drastic decline in wild hare populations across Europe. In the present day, EBHS is endemic to many regions of central and southern Europe. Typically, surges in outbreaks and mortality seasonally occur during the autumn months when the population density of hares is at its highest.

More recently in 2020, recombination events within the nonstructural genes of the virus have been observed. These recombination events and other mutations are currently being closely monitored due to their potential to increase the epizootic potential of the virus.

The monitoring of outbreaks and recombination events is of the utmost importance because many impacted species are already threatened. The current conservation status of the Corsican hare (Lepus corsicanus) is threatened due to habitat loss and a variety of other factors. Although disease control is difficult, isolating disease-free sub-populations of hares and an implementation of a vaccination program are potential methods that have been looked into for combating disease spread.

== Transmission ==
EBHS is transmitted through the fecal-oral route or inhalation of aerosols. Direct or indirect contact with various infected materials such as contaminated fomites and green forage contribute to the spread of this disease. The carcasses of previously infected hares often contribute to the continued presence of the virus in the environment. Insects have been observed to be a mechanical vector for Lagovirus europaeus.

== Virology ==
Lagovirus europaeus is a non-enveloped 7.5 kb positive sense single-stranded RNA virus. The genome of Lagovirus europaeus contains two open reading frames. ORF1 produces a polyprotein which is cleaved by a 3C-like protease (3CLpro) that is also created by the virus. This cleavage produces the capsid protein VP60 and seven mature non-structural proteins, p16, p23, 2C-like RNA helicase, p29, VPg, 3C-like protease, and RNA-dependent RNA polymerase (RdRp). ORF2 produces VP10, a minor structural protein.

Two forms of RNA can be isolated from the liver of an infected hare: 7.5 kb genomic RNA and 2.2 kb sub-genomic RNA. This sub-genomic RNA is vital in producing structural proteins needed for the intermediate and late stages of the viral life cycle. VPg is found linked to the 5’ terminus of both RNA forms where it plays an important role as a primer.

Multiple recombination breakpoints have been observed throughout the Lagovirus europaeus genome. One particular breakpoint is located between the polymerase and capsid genes. This spot has been observed to be a hotspot for recombination. This recombination is important for maintaining genetic diversity.

Two lineages of Lagovirus europaeus have been described and studied: group A and group B. Group A was the first lineage described in the literature. This lineage would dominate in the population until 1989 when it would disappear. Group B appeared in the mid 1980s and it remains the dominant lineage.

== Pathogenesis ==
After being exposed to Lagovirus europaeus, the hare’s liver becomes the target for the virus. Once the virus enters the liver, it becomes the primary site of viral replication. This replication occurs in the cytoplasm of hepatocytes. The replication of this virus within the liver eventually leads to the formation of diffuse hemorrhagic lesions and liver degeneration. Macrophages also act as an important source of the virus after 3-4 days of infection.

EBHS has a high mortality rate within adult hares. Hares that contract the virus die from hepatic failure and necrosis within 2-7 days before clinical signs are visible, following a period of anorexia and depression. Hares younger than 2-3 months are considered resistant to EBHS with any infections being subclinical. These younger hares that do become infected will develop antibodies to the virus and acquire long-lasting immunity. This immunity can contribute to herd immunity of hare populations within endemic areas.

== Diagnosis ==
Proper diagnostic tools and methods are vital in preventing the spread of EBHS among captive hare populations. Two of the most common methods used for diagnosis currently are RT-PCR and serological testing through the use of ELISA. These methods are helpful in ruling out Rabbit Hemorrhagic Disease. Because both diseases produce similar hepatic lesions, it can be difficult in determining the causative agent of the disease without proper diagnostic tools.

== Treatment ==
Currently, not many treatments exist for EBHS. There are currently not any conventional vaccines commercially available for Lagovirus europaeus. Farmers typically use autogenous killed vaccines whenever large outbreaks occur to prevent the spread of the virus. While an experimental vaccine targeting the VP60 capsid protein has shown success in experimental settings, important questions still remain on the duration of protection provided by the vaccine and the efficacy of the vaccine in wild settings.

Currently, protease inhibitors are being explored as a potential antiviral treatment for EBHS. These inhibitors could target 3CLpro to prevent the cleavage that produces many of the structural and non-structural proteins needed for the virus to propagate.

Due to the rapid spread of the virus and its high mortality rate, the World Health Organisation for Animal Health advises prevention of infected hare population translocation. This includes the use of proper fencing to prevent interactions between wild and captive hares and serological testing on any hares introduced into a captive population.
