= Central Otago Great Easter Bunny Hunt =

Annual rabbit cull in New Zealand

- Status: Active
- Genre: Cull
- Date: Easter
- Frequency: Annual
- Location: Alexandra, New Zealand
- Inaugurated: 1990s
- Founder: Dave Ramsay
- Participants: 31 teams (average)
- Major events: Nuisance wildlife management
- Organiser: Alexandra Lions Club

The Central Otago Great Easter Bunny Hunt is an annual rabbit cull held every Easter in and around Alexandra, New Zealand, since the early 1990s. It is organised by Alexandra Lions Club and convened by Dave Ramsay. Central Otago is an area of New Zealand where rabbits are a non-native, invasive, serious problem with no natural predators, and land owners have a legal obligation to control them. In 2016, "the Otago Regional Council budget[ed] 2200 hours a year for biosecurity officers to police this, and in 2013, one landowner was taken to court over excessive rabbits."

== Environmental necessity ==
"It took only a handful of years for Central Otago’s rabbits to transform from sport into problem. The Acclimatisation Society of Otago released 60 bunnies in 1866, but five years later, its chairman wrote to the Otago Witness pleading for its readers to stop setting rabbits free in the high country: they were eating the land bare." In 1876 New Zealand's Rabbit Nuisance Act was passed.

"Central Otago’s rabbits have long been known simply as ‘the evil’. They've held the title of the region's worst pest since the middle of the 19th century, maintaining it in the face of helicopter hunters, poison-laced carrots, aerial 1080 drops, rabbit-proof fences and biological warfare, in the form of a virus smuggled into the country by farmers in 1997." Additional misguided attempts at controlling the rabbits included releasing ferrets in 1879 even after warnings were made of their effects on bird life. The ferrets devastated the native bird populations and are now hunted pests. In 1885 stoats and weasels were released in another misguided effort, and are also now hunted pests. Reporter Rebekah White described the rabbit damage on "the naked, pockmarked hillside I’m standing on. It looks as though it has been strafed repeatedly, and it’s bereft of plants—just scree and dirt that the breeze occasionally picks up and shifts. A little more time under the rule of rabbits and it’ll be more dune than hill."

== Event format ==
- Teams are permitted 12 shooters and additional support crew.
- The previous year's top teams get automatic re-entry (usually 4-5 spots depending on the year). The remaining teams are selected by lottery.
- The number of slots is determined by the number of land blocks available, which is determined by the number of farmers offering land for the event. There have always been more teams applying than slots. Farmers decline to participate in subsequent years for various reasons—including because they have managed to get their rabbit populations under control, because prior teams have abused their property, or because of a change of ownership.
- Land blocks are assigned by lottery, in order of furthest to nearest. The level of rabbit infestation of a block is a huge factor in the success of its team.
- Other acceptable pest targets include hares, stoats, possums, turkeys, wild goats, wild pigs.

Teams generally hunt individually on foot during the day, and from vehicles in groups at night when the rabbits are more plentiful.

== Results ==
Year	Number of Teams	Tally	Winner	Winner's Tally
2010	39	23,064	SWAT	2,306
2011	47	22,904	Beige Brigade Wolfpack	1,664
2012	36	10,424	Southern Hopper Stoppers	1,035
2013	36 ^{[note 1]}	18,027	Hair Raisin' Mutineers	1,366
2014	25	7,478	Wabbit Warriors	769
2015	24	8,439	Down South	876
2016	27	10,010	Down South	889
2017	21	8,000+		
2018			Cancelled: K5 rabbit virus release	
2019			Cancelled: extreme fire risk	
2020			Cancelled: COVID-19	
2021	25	11,968	Overkill	1,185 ^{[note 2]}
2022				
2023			Cancelled: safety concerns	
2024			Cancelled: fire risk	

== End of an era ==
The long-running Central Otago Easter Bunny Hunt has been cancelled due to landowner hesitancy and liability concerns and is unlikely to return in its traditional form.

== See also ==
- Invasive species in New Zealand
- Timeline of the New Zealand environment
- 1080 usage in New Zealand
- Rabbit hemorrhagic disease

== Notes ==
1. First shooting incident in the event's 23-year history. A 26-year-old Southland man accidentally shot himself while hunting alone on a Queensberry property and was flown to Dunedin Hospital. It was thought he lost his footing while shooting and fell, receiving injuries to his left hand and forehead. The man had surgery overnight and was recovering the next day.
2. Because the hunt was cancelled in 2018, 2019, & 2020 the hunt was expanded from 24 hours to two nights in 2021, running from 8am on Good Friday until noon on Easter Sunday (52 hours).
