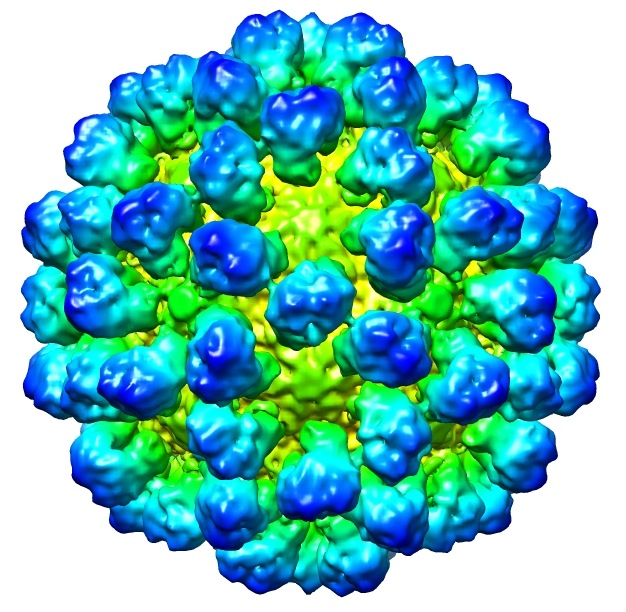
- CryoEM reconstruction of Rabbit hemorrhagic disease virus (RHDV) capsid. EMDB entry EMD-1933

Virus classification
- (unranked): Virus
- Realm: Riboviria
- Kingdom: Orthornavirae
- Phylum: Pisuviricota
- Class: Pisoniviricetes
- Order: Picornavirales
- Family: Caliciviridae
- Genus: Lagovirus

Species
- European brown hare syndrome virus; Rabbit hemorrhagic disease virus

= Lagovirus =

Genus of viruses

Lagovirus is a genus of viruses, in the family Caliciviridae. Lagomorphs serve as natural hosts. There are two species in this genus. Diseases associated with this genus include: necrotizing hepatitis leading to fatal hemorrhages.

== Taxonomy ==
The genus contains the following species:

- European brown hare syndrome virus
- Rabbit hemorrhagic disease virus

== Virion properties ==
=== Morphology ===
Virions consist of a capsid. The capsid is not enveloped, round with T=3 icosahedral symmetry. The isometric capsid has a diameter of 35–39 nm. Particles with T=1 symmetry, composed of 60 capsid proteins are also observed, which have diameter of about 15 nm. Capsids appear round to hexagonal in outline. The capsid surface structure reveals a regular pattern with distinctive features. The capsomer arrangement is clearly visible. Capsid with 32 cup-shaped depressions.

Genus	Structure	Symmetry	Capsid	Genomic arrangement	Genomic segmentation
Lagovirus	Icosahedral	T=1, T=3	Non-enveloped	Linear	Monopartite

=== Life cycle ===
Viral replication is cytoplasmic. Entry into the host cell is achieved by attachment to host receptors, which mediates endocytosis. Replication follows the positive stranded RNA virus replication model. Positive stranded RNA virus transcription is the method of transcription. Translation takes place by RNA termination-reinitiation. Lagomorphs serve as the natural host.

Genus	Host details	Tissue tropism	Entry details	Release details	Replication site	Assembly site	Transmission
Lagovirus	Lagomorphs	Liver	Cell receptor endocytosis	Lysis	Cytoplasm	Cytoplasm	Contact

=== Physical and chemical properties ===
The molecular mass (Mr) of virions is 15×10^{6}. Virions have a buoyant density in Caesium chloride (CsCl) of 1.33–1.36 g/cm^{3}. The density gradient of virions in Potassium Tartrate-Glycerol is 1.29 g/cm^{3}. The sedimentation coefficient is 170–187 svedberg (s_{20,w}); of the other(s) are peak 160–170 svedberg (s_{20,w}) (believed to consist of defective interfering particles). Under in vitro conditions virions are inactivated in acid environment of pH 4.5–7; stable in alkaline environment of pH 7–10.5. Virions are not stable at raised temperature in presence of high concentration of Mg^{++}. Virions are sensitive to treatment with trypsin (in some strains, not sensitive to treatment with mild detergents, or ether, or chloroform. The infectivity is enhanced after treatment with trypsin (in some strains).

=== Genome ===
The genome is not segmented and contains a single molecule of linear positive-sense, ssRNA. Minor species of non-genomic nucleic acid are some times also found in virions. The encapsidated nucleic acid is mainly of genomic origin, but virions may also contain subgenomic RNA. The complete genome is 7450 nucleotides long. The genome has a guanine + cytosine content of 49.3–50.1 %. The 5' end of the genome has a usually genome-linked protein (VPg), or methylated nucleotide cap (in the case of Hepatitis E virus). The 3' terminus has a poly (A) tract. Each virion contains a full-length copy, or defective interfering copies.

=== Proteins ===
The viral genome encodes viral structural protein. Virions consist of 1 structural protein(s) (major species located in the capsid.

Viral structural protein: Capsid protein has a molar mass of 59000–71000 Da; is the coat protein. Capsid protein has a molecular mass of minor 'soluble' 28–30 kDa.

=== Antigenicity ===
Cross-reactivity is found. Cross-reactivity between species of the same serotype, but not with species of another serotype and some species of the same serotype, but not with all. Although the degree of antigenic specificity varies with the degree of relatedness, the antigenicity is distinct from serogroups of the same genus. Most species in the genus are related antigenically. They are sharing some epitopes in the structural proteins.
