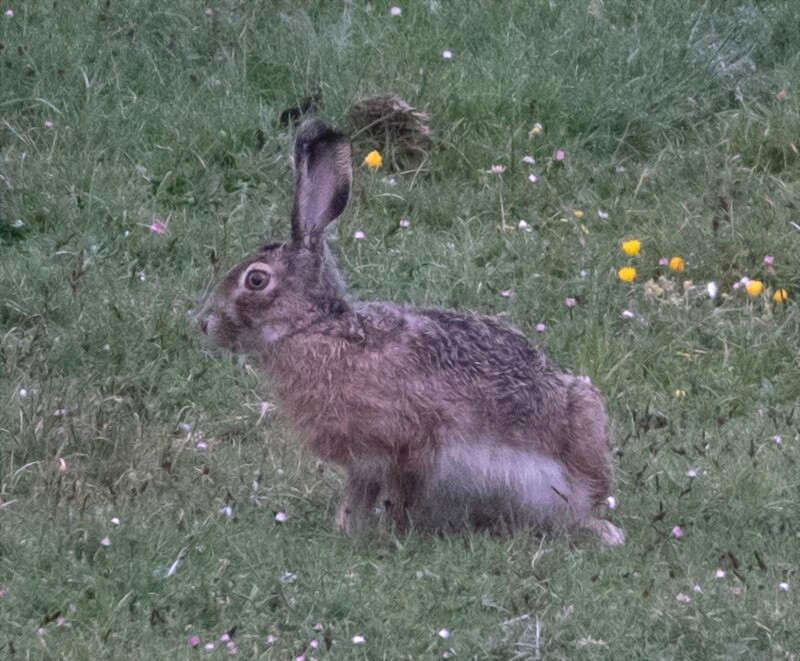
- Asturias, Spain

Conservation status
- Vulnerable (IUCN 3.1)

Scientific classification
- Kingdom: Animalia
- Phylum: Chordata
- Class: Mammalia
- Order: Lagomorpha
- Family: Leporidae
- Genus: Lepus
- Species: L. castroviejoi

Binomial name
- Lepus castroviejoi Palacios, 1976
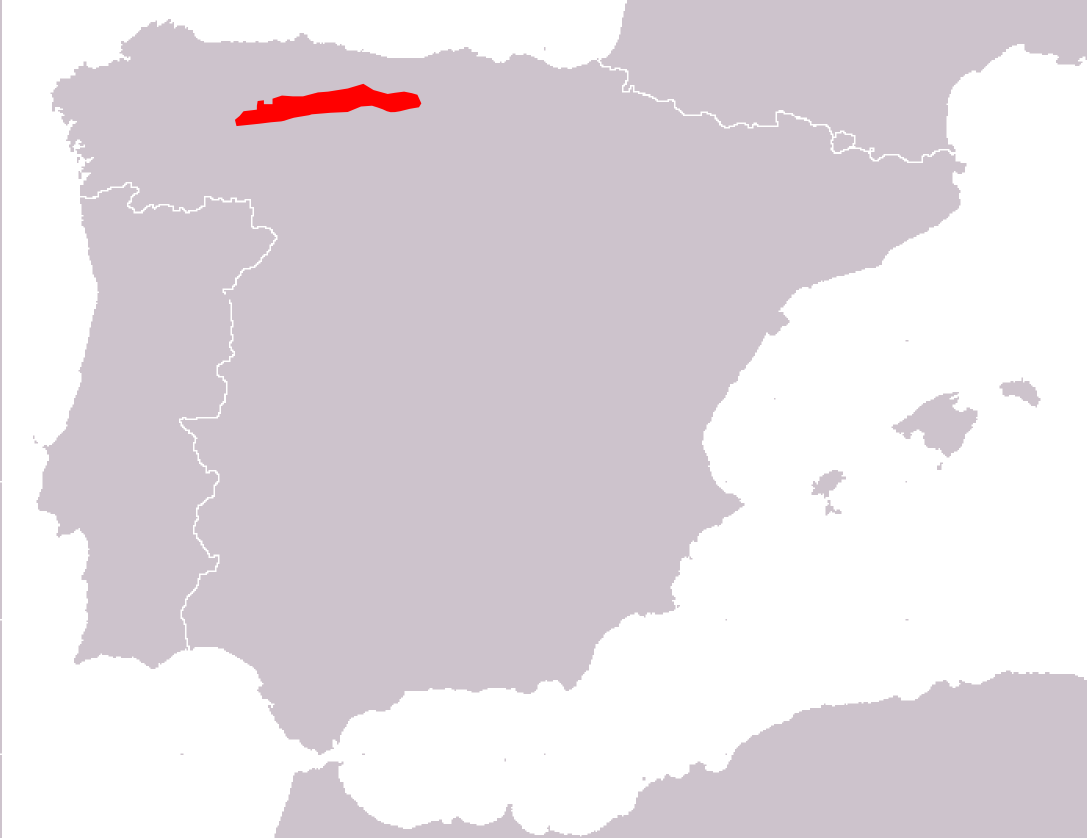

= Broom hare =

Species of mammal

The broom hare (Lepus castroviejoi) (Spanish: liebre de piornal) is a species of hare that is endemic to northern Spain. It was described in 1976 as separate from the Granada hare. It is classified as vulnerable by the IUCN.

== Taxonomy ==
The broom hare was described by Fernando Palacios in 1976 as a new species split from the Granada hare (Lepus granatensis) based on genetic evidence. It was given the species name castroviejoi as a tribute to Spanish biologist Javier Castroviejo, then director of the Estación Biológica de Doñana.

Taxonomically, the species is close to the Corsican hare; the two are thought to have had a common ancestor in the Late Pleistocene. The broom hare is placed in the subgenus Eulagos.

== Description ==
The broom hare body length ranges from 45–65 cm (18–26 in). Its tail grows to lengths of 5–10 cm (2.0–3.9 in). Its front legs grow from 10–20 cm (3.9–7.9 in) and the back legs can grow from 20–30 cm (7.9–11.8 in). The ears can grow to be as long as 18–20 cm (7.1–7.9 in). The fur of the broom hare is a mixture of brown and black, with very little white on the upper part of the body. The underside of the body is all white. The top of the tail is black, while the underside of the tail matches the body in being white. The ears are brownish-gray and are usually black-tipped.

The size of the species is between those of the Granada hare and the European hare (the other two species of hare that occur in Spain). Individuals weigh between 2 and 3.5 kilograms (4.4 and 7.7 lb).

== Distribution and habitat ==
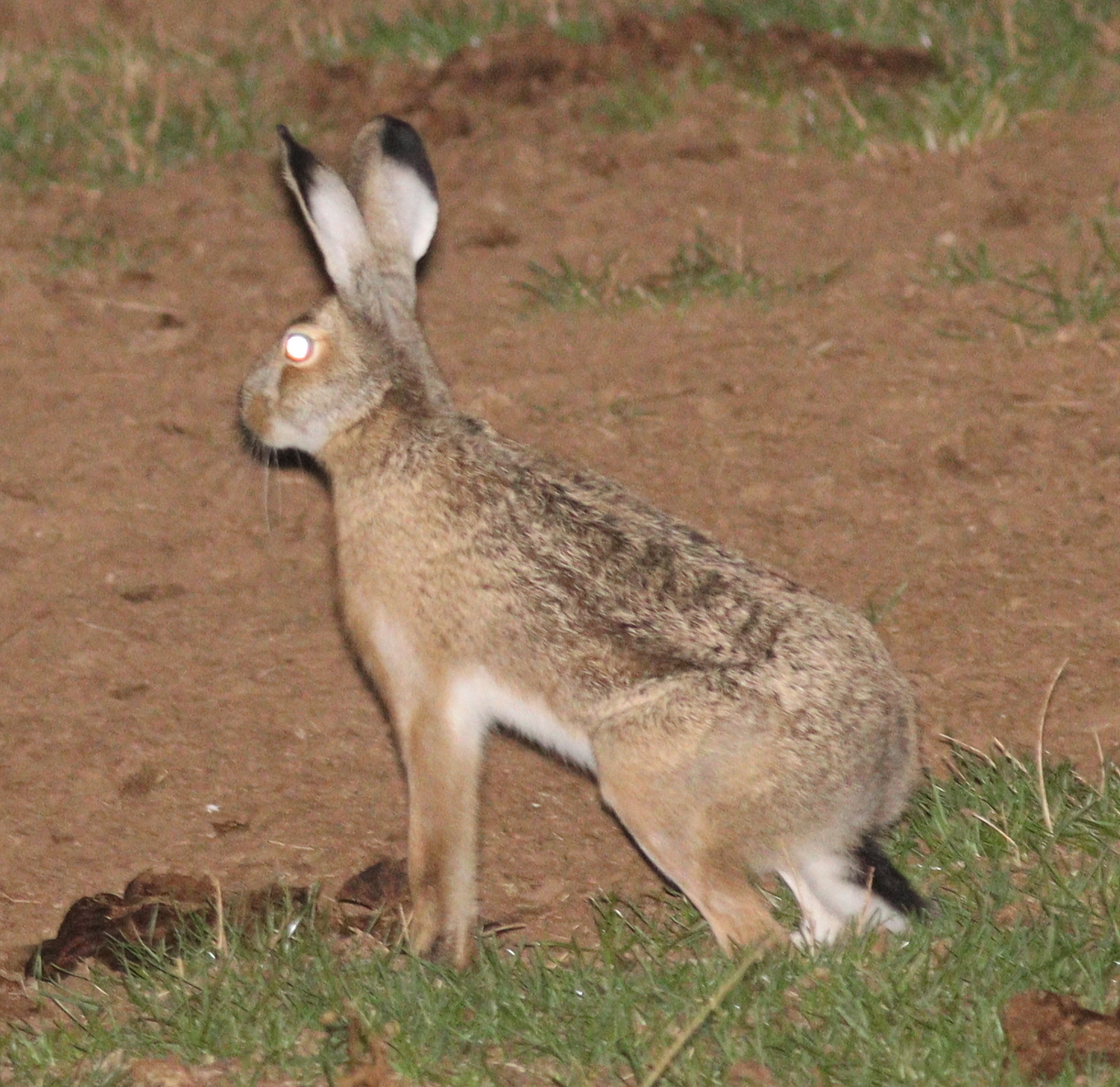
An alert broom hare in Tejerina, León, Spain

It is restricted to the Cantabrian Mountains in northern Spain between the Serra dos Ancares and the Sierra de Peña Labra. This region is about 230 km (140 mi) from east to west and 25–40 km (16–25 mi) from north to south. It lives in mountains at elevations up to 2,000 m (6,600 ft), though it descends during the winter to avoid the colder temperatures and snow. Its preferred habitat is heathland, containing mainly Erica, Calluna, and Vaccinium, with much shrub cover of Cytisus, Genista, and Juniperus. It also inhabits clearings in mixed deciduous forests of oak and beech.

Its distribution is very fragmented.

== Behaviour ==
The species is mostly nocturnal. Little is known about its diet, though it eats grasses and other plants.

The ecology of the species is also little known; it may be preyed upon by mammals such as the Iberian wolf and red fox, and birds of prey such as the golden eagle.

Courtship behaviour has been seen to take place in April and May, but other than this there is no information about the species' reproduction.

== Human interaction and impact ==
The broom hare is listed on the IUCN's Red List of Threatened Species as vulnerable. The major threat listed to their status is hunting. Hunting them is excessive in many areas they inhabit, especially when the hares are isolated during the winter.

The species is hunted throughout its range. It is also threatened by changes to its habitat, which could be caused by climate change.
