= Autogenous vaccine =

Type of vaccine

Autogenous vaccines, also called autologous vaccines, autovaccines, "self", or custom vaccines, are vaccines that are prepared by isolation and destruction of microorganisms in infected individuals and used to provide immunity to those same individuals.

Autogenous vaccines were introduced in the early twentieth century, with growing evidence of their efficacy against certain infections. They rely on the activation of the individual's immune system to produce immunity against the infectious pathogen. They are usually produced when an individual or small group is presented with a disease, and they can be applied to various bacterial and viral infections. Autogenous vaccines are similar to conventional vaccines in terms of their use. However, they are dissimilar and arguably preferred over conventional vaccines in certain areas. Currently, several autogenous vaccines are available for veterinary use in several countries. Human use of this type of vaccine is limited and has not been widely approved due to lack of scientific evidence and research.

== History ==
Autogenous vaccines have been researched since as early as the 1900s. This type of vaccine was first introduced by Sir Almroth Edward Wright in 1903 and in the following years, several case reports were published regarding the preparation and indications of autogenous vaccines.

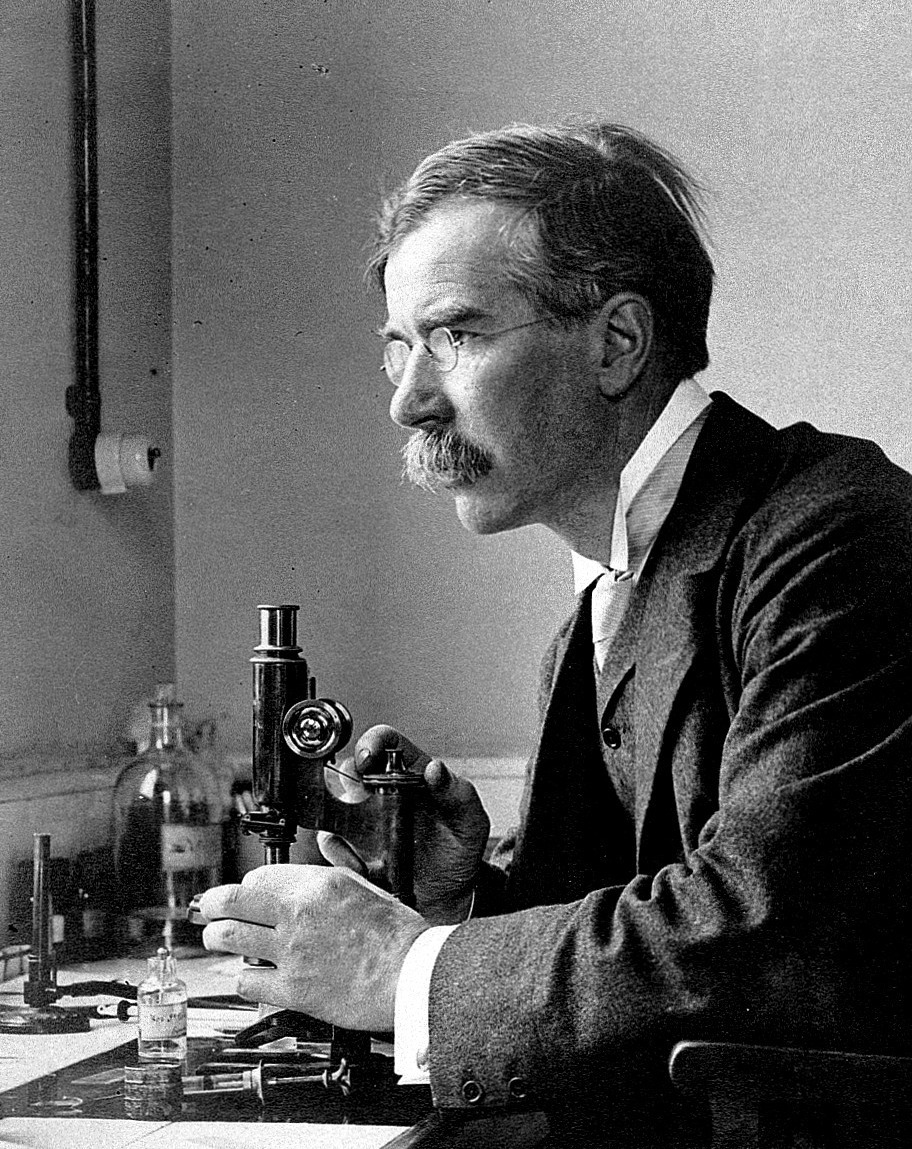
Sir Almroth Edward Wright was a strong advocate of preventive medicine

Autogenous vaccines were used in adults, children, and infants to treat various chronic infections, including skin infections, respiratory tract infections, colon infections and urinary tract infections. Autogenous vaccines were also used in cases of bronchial asthma, sepsis, gonorrhea, candidiasis, and osteomyelitis among others.

The efficacy of autogenous vaccines for human use has shown varying results. Patient responses range from no relapses for years to no effects at all, to being presented with local and systemic adverse reactions, especially with high doses. The concern of potential adverse effects led to the introduction of intracutaneous skin tests by I. Chandler Walker in 1917. Investigators later concluded that autogenous vaccines provide hyposensitisation in patients with chronic and recurrent infections who may induce allergic reactions.

Autogenous vaccines soon became less popular as a therapeutic agent against bacterial infection due to the discovery of antibiotics. However, antibiotics proved to be less than satisfactory in their efficacy for prolonged consumption and caused unwanted complications, eventually leading to the resumption of autogenous vaccines.

Autogenous vaccines are now less used in humans than in animals. Human use is mostly restricted to eastern Europe to treat chronic and recurrent diseases, for example chronic staphylococcal infections. For animals, conventional mass-produced vaccines are less effective as they rarely take strain variations into account due to high costs of research and development. Autogenous vaccines provide an alternative way to induce immunity in animals without paying expensive fees for unnecessary vaccine strains.

== Mechanism of action ==
The mechanism of action of autogenous vaccine is not fully understood, however, it is suggested that it involves activation of the innate immune system to produce a nonspecific immune response and activation of the adaptive immune system to produce a specific immune response. Following the injection, the innate immune system is activated and sends large amounts of phagocytes to the injection site which kills the microorganisms. Phagocytes will then present the antigens to T helper cells to activate the adaptive immune system. T helper cells activate macrophages and neutrophils to aid in killing the pathogenic microorganisms. T helper cells also aid plasma cells to produce antibodies, thus allowing the immune system to "remember" the vaccine agents. As the surface antigens in the vaccine are the same as those of the disease, the immune system can recognise the pathogenic agents and produce an immune response to kill them when the pathogen is encountered.

== Preparation ==
In human beings, samples of pathogens are isolated from a site of infection in the sick individual, for instance pus or abscess, sputum, urine and vaginal discharge. The identified pathogenic agents will then be cultured and inactivated, either by chemicals or by heat. The inactivation process involves the destruction of the antigen activity while preserving the protein composition of it, as the state of the protein can affect the effectiveness of immune response in the patient. Tests will then be conducted to ensure the sterility, safety and quality. The whole manufacturing process can take up to 3 to 4 weeks depending on the manufacturer.

In animals, the preparation is similar. An example of this is when an infectious disorder is discovered in a farm herd. This discovery prompts the veterinarian to take samples from infected animals. These samples will then be delivered to a laboratory for culture and isolation of the pathogenic agents. Once the pathogenic agents are identified, they can be used to manufacture vaccines. This is followed by a series of steps to formulate the desired product and ensure its quality and safety. The formulated vaccine is then delivered back to the veterinarian where the vaccine will be administered to the herd.

== Applications ==
=== In humans ===
Before the formulated vaccine is administered to the patient, the patient receives an intradermal skin test to ensure the patient does not have any hypersensitivity reactions to the vaccine. Once the test is conducted and proven negative, treatment can begin.

The autogenous vaccine is applied subcutaneously in intervals over weeks or months. The application process usually involves a gradual increase in doses and intervals. Another administration method is by oral therapy, especially in bronchial asthma. In light of possible adverse effects, the patient should be observed for an hour after the administration.

=== In animals ===
Autogenous vaccines are used to treat various animal infections, including but not limited to dermatitis, sinusitis, otitis externa, pharyngitis, laryngitis and mastitis that may be induced by Gram-positive or Gram-negative bacteria, dermatophytes and yeasts.

Generally, indications of autogenous vaccines include resistance of pathogenic microorganisms to antibiotic treatment, ineffective therapy or immune response and lack of commercial vaccines.

Autogenous vaccines can be made for single individuals (dogs, cats, rabbits or horses) when treatments fail to provide desired results or large groups (fish, cows, pigs, goats, horses or poultry) when spread of a disease needs to be controlled.

For dogs, autogenous vaccines are typically prepared for dogs with pyoderma and inflammation of the middle and outer ear, especially when previous treatment of antibiotics failed to show desirable results. Autogenous vaccines are also useful for rabbits suffering from subcutaneous abscesses, cats with purulent lesions and horses with inflammation of the noses and sinuses, which are all caused by staphylococci infections. For pigs, autogenous vaccines can be used for skin infections; while for cows, they can be used for mastitis.

Before the formulated vaccine is administered to the animal, an immunostimulant containing bacteria will be given once subcutaneously several days early. The immunostimulation will activate macrophages such that bacteria from the autogenous vaccine can be more effectively destroyed.

The vaccine itself can be administered differently depending on the species. The route of administration for most animals is subcutaneous injection, while injections are administered intramuscularly to pigs and in the wing membrane to birds. The dose can also vary depending on the animal and disease. The usual method is either three doses of the same volume but increasing density, three doses of the same density with the last two as booster doses, or one dose only. Sometimes treatment is combined with antibiotics to generate a more effective result.

== Comparison with conventional vaccines ==
Comparison between conventional vaccines and autogenous vaccines
	Conventional vaccines	Autogenous vaccines
Similarities	To enhance the immunity of an individual toward a disease; Can apply to a wide range of diseases	To enhance the immunity of an individual toward a disease; Can apply to a wide range of diseases
Differences	For prevention; Mass-produced for a community; Normally produced from an inactivated or killed pathogen of certain bacterial or viral strains	For prevention and therapeutic use (can be used before or after disease outbreak); Produced for an individual or a group; Produced from an individual's own cells

== Advantages and disadvantages ==
=== Advantages ===
There are several advantages of autogenous vaccines:

One of the major advantages is its effect in prevention of disease. This is the function of every vaccine, to limit the disease occurrence and spread, and to treat diseases associated with antibiotic-resistant bacteria. Autogenous vaccines can also reduce the costs of production. The costs of research and development for a conventional vaccine is high compared to the cost needed to produce autogenous vaccines. In some cases, conventional vaccines fail to provide total immunity to a disease and thus is not economically profitable.

Also, this type of vaccine limits the number of vaccine interventions by combining several valencies such that the number of injections required is low.

Another advantage is to ensure food safety. Autogenous vaccines allow cattle and poultry to be healthy and suitable for human consumption, by inducing immunity in animals, reducing the excretion of microbial toxins that can cause infections and limiting the use of excessive therapeutic agents. Autogenous vaccines are also a good and quick alternative when there are no vaccines for a novel emerging disease or a relatively uncommon disease or a relatively uncommon species. This type of vaccine can also be used when there is antigenic variability within the same bacterial species such that conventional vaccines cannot provide specific immunity.

=== Disadvantages ===
However, there are downsides to autogenous vaccines. One of the major disadvantages is the pathogenic antigen cannot always be identified correctly and accurately due to limitations in knowledge and technology. Another disadvantage is adjuvants used in vaccines to ensure its safety is limited in autogenous vaccines as they require extensive testing. Also, the cost of producing autogenous vaccines tailor-made for each individual or group can be greater than that of conventional vaccines in the long run.

==== Adverse effects ====
Autogenous vaccines are generally considered safe. However, adverse effects may occur at the site of injection, such as mild redness and swelling, as well as rare systemic reactions such as fever, sore throat, headache and malaise.

== Regulation ==
Autogenous vaccines are regulated in areas such as the United States, Europe and the United Kingdom. Use of autogenous vaccines in the United States are regulated under the 1995 Virus-Serum-Toxin Act. Europe mainly focuses on veterinary use regulations while the Veterinary Medicines Directorate is the authority responsible for overseeing the use and quality of veterinary medical products, including autogenous vaccines.

== See also ==
- Vaccine
- Therapeutic vaccines
- Immune system
- Immunotherapy
