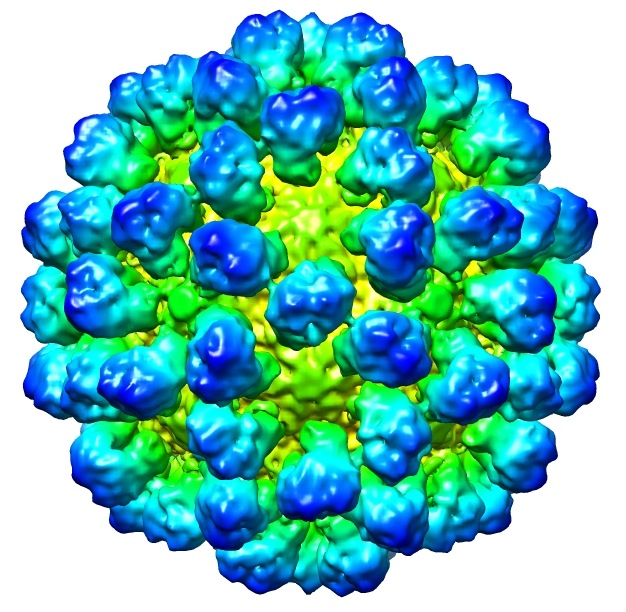
- CryoEM reconstruction of the virus capsid. EMDB entry EMD-1933

Virus classification
- (unranked): Virus
- Realm: Riboviria
- Kingdom: Orthornavirae
- Phylum: Pisuviricota
- Class: Pisoniviricetes
- Order: Picornavirales
- Family: Caliciviridae
- Genus: Lagovirus
- Species: Rabbit hemorrhagic disease virus

Isolates
- RHDV [FRG/89] (RHDV-FRG); RCV [ITL/95] (RHDV-RCV); RCV-A1 [MIC-07/2007/AU] (RHDV-RCV-A1); RHDV [Ashington/1998/UK] (RHDV-Ash)

Synonyms
- Lagovirus europeus GI Pendu et al., 2017

= Rabbit hemorrhagic disease =

Rabbit hemorrhagic disease virus

Disease that affects wild and domestic rabbits

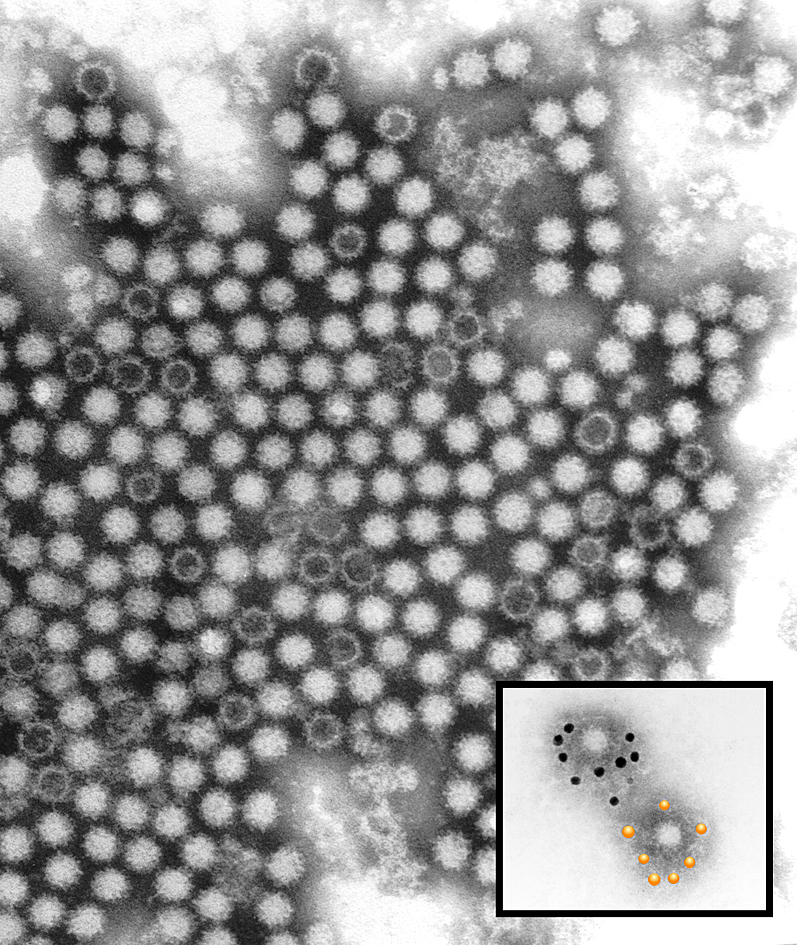
Rabbit Calicivirus CSIRO

Rabbit hemorrhagic disease (RHD), also known as viral hemorrhagic disease (VHD), is a highly infectious and lethal form of viral hepatitis that affects European rabbits. Some viral strains also affect hares and cottontail rabbits. Mortality rates generally range from 70 to 100 percent. The disease is caused by strains of rabbit hemorrhagic disease virus (RHDV), a lagovirus in the family Caliciviridae.

== Rabbit hemorrhagic disease virus ==
Rabbit hemorrhagic disease virus (RHDV) is a virus in the genus Lagovirus and the family Caliciviridae. It is a nonenveloped virus with a diameter around 35–40 nm, icosahedral symmetry, and a linear positive-sense RNA genome of 6.4–8.5 kb. RHDV causes a generalized infection in rabbits that is characterized by necrosis of the liver, disseminated intravascular coagulation, and rapid death. Division into serotypes has been defined by a lack of cross-neutralization using specific antisera. Rabbit lagoviruses also include related caliciviruses such as European brown hare syndrome virus.

RHDV appears to have evolved from a pre-existing avirulent rabbit calicivirus (RCV). Nonpathogenic rabbit caliciviruses related to, but distinct from RHDV, had been circulating, apparently harmlessly, in Europe, Australia, and New Zealand prior to the emergence of RHDV. In the course of its evolution, RHDV split into six distinct genotypes, all of which are highly pathogenic.

The three strains of rabbit hemorrhagic disease virus of medical significance are RHDV, RHDVa and RHDV2. RHDV (also referred to as RHDV, RHDV1, or as classical RHD) only affects adult European rabbits (Oryctolagus cuniculus). This virus was first reported in China in 1984, from which it spread to much of Asia, Europe, Australia, and elsewhere. A few isolated outbreaks of RHDV have occurred in the United States and Mexico, but they remained localized and were eradicated.

In 2010, a new lagovirus with a distinct antigenic profile was identified in France. The new virus, named rabbit hemorrhagic disease virus type 2 (abbreviated as RHDV2 or RHDVb), also caused RHD, but exhibited distinctive genetic, antigenic, and pathogenic features. Importantly, RHDV2 killed rabbits previously vaccinated with RHDV vaccines, and affected young European rabbits, as well as hares (Lepus spp.). All these features strongly suggest that the virus was not derived from RHDVa, but from some other unknown source. RHDV2 has since spread to the majority of Europe, as well as to Australia, Canada, and the United States.

== Epidemiology and transmission ==
Both viruses causing RHD are extremely contagious. Transmission occurs by direct contact with infected animals, carcasses, bodily fluids (urine, feces, respiratory secretions), and hair. Surviving rabbits may be contagious for up to 2 months. Contaminated fomites, such as clothing, food, cages, bedding, feeders, and water, also spread the virus. Flies, fleas, and mosquitoes can carry at least the viral RNA, suggesting a role as mechanical vectors. Predators and scavengers can also spread the virus by shedding it in their feces. Caliciviruses are highly resistant in the environment, and can survive freezing for prolonged periods. The virus can persist in infected meat for months, and for prolonged periods in decomposing carcasses. Importation of rabbit meat may be a major contributor in the spread of the virus to new geographic regions.

RHD outbreaks tend to be seasonal in wild rabbit populations, where most adults have survived infection and are immune. As young kits grow up and stop nursing, they no longer receive the antibodies provided in their mother's milk and become susceptible to infection. Thus, RHD epizootics occur more often during the rabbits' breeding season.

Generally, high host specificity exists among lagoviruses. Classic RHDVa affects only European rabbits, a species native to Europe and from which the domestic rabbit is descended. The new variant RHDV2 affects European rabbits, as well, but also causes fatal RHD in various Lepus species, including Sardinian Cape hares (L. capensis mediterraneus), Italian hares (L. corsicanus), and mountain hares (L. timidus). Reports of RHD in Sylvilagus species have been coming from the current outbreak in the United States.

RHD caused by RHDV and RHDVa demonstrates high morbidity (up to 100%) and mortality (40-100%) in adult European rabbits. Young rabbits 6–8 weeks old are less likely to be infected, and kits younger than 4 weeks old do not become ill. The more recently emerged RHDV2 causes death and disease in rabbits as young as 15 days old. Mortality rates from RHDV2 are more variable at 5-70%. Initially less virulent, the pathogenicity of RHDV2 has been increasing and is now similar to that found with RHDV and RHDVa. Deaths from RHDV2 have been confirmed in rabbits previously vaccinated against RHDVa.

== Pathophysiology ==
These viruses replicate in the liver and by mechanisms not fully elucidated, trigger the mass death of hepatocytes which can in turn lead to disseminated intravascular coagulation, hepatic encephalopathy, and nephrosis. Bleeding may occur, as clotting factors and platelets are used up.

== Clinical signs ==
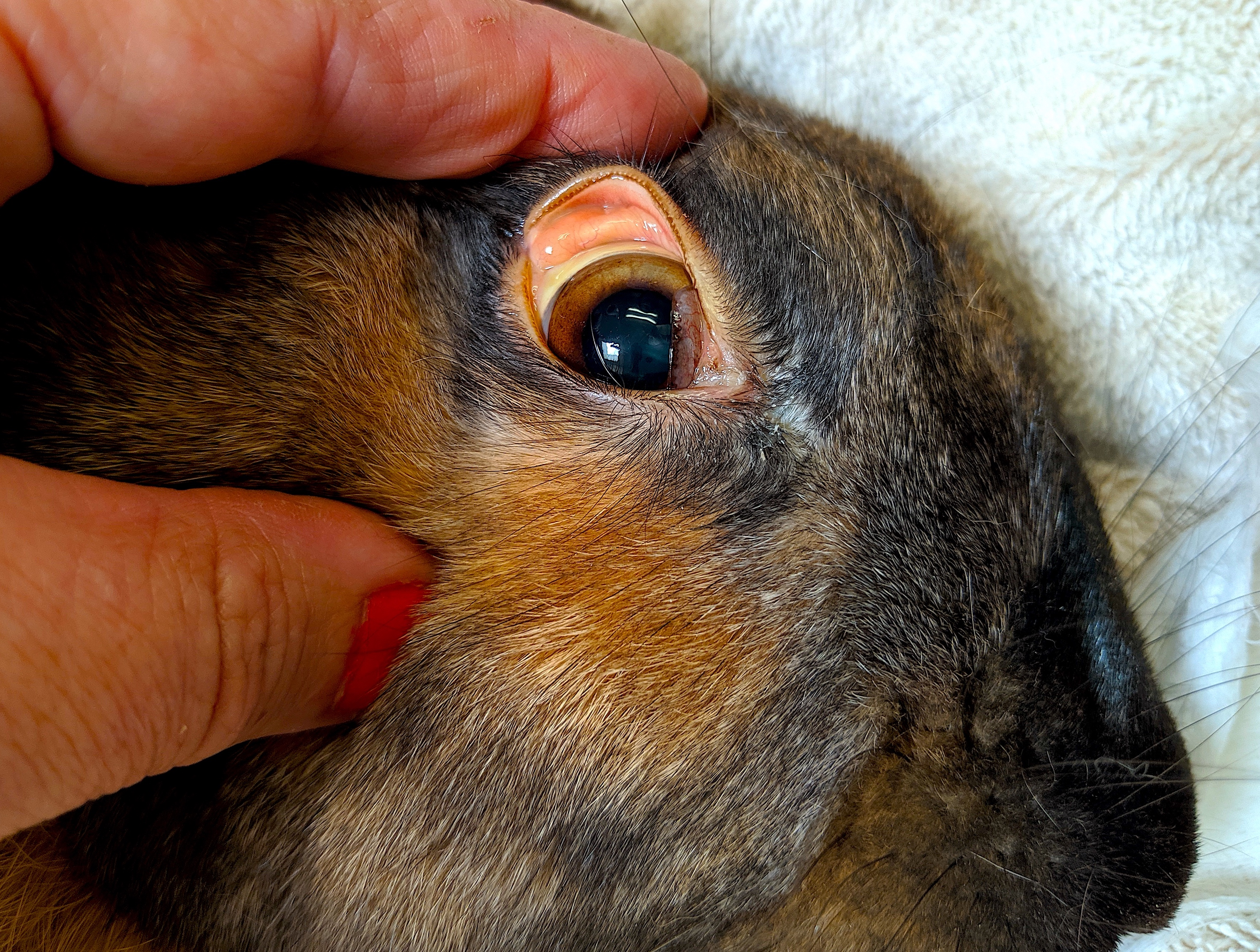
European rabbit with ocular jaundice

The incubation period for RHDVa is 1–2 days, and for RHDV2 3–5 days. Rabbits infected with RHDV2 are more likely to show subacute or chronic signs than are those infected with RHDVa. In rabbitries, an epidemic with high mortality rates in adult and subadult rabbits is typical. Rabbits younger than 4 weeks of age rarely exhibit the lethal form of the disease. Maternal antibodies preserve functionality within the rabbit kittens age of 6-11 weeks old.

RHD can vary in the rate clinical signs occur. In peracute cases, rabbits are usually found dead with no premonitory symptoms. Rabbits may be observed grazing normally immediately before death.

In acute cases, rabbits are inactive and reluctant to move. They may develop a fever up to 42 °C (107.6 °F) and have increased heart and respiratory rates. Bloody discharge from the nose, mouth, or vulva is common, as is blood in the feces or urine. Lateral recumbency, coma, and convulsions may be observed before death. Rabbits with the acute form generally die within 12 to 36 hours from the onset of fever.

Subacute to chronic RHD has a more protracted clinical course, and is more commonly noted with RHDV2 infections. Clinical signs include lethargy, anorexia, weight loss, and jaundice. Gastrointestinal dilation, cardiac arrhythmias, heart murmurs, and neurologic abnormalities can also occur. Death, if it occurs, usually happens 1–2 weeks after the onset of symptoms, and is due to liver failure.

Not all rabbits exposed to RHDVa or RHDV2 become overtly ill. A small proportion of infected rabbits clears the virus without developing signs of disease. Asymptomatic carriers also occur, and can continue to shed virus for months, thereby infecting other animals. Surviving rabbits develop a strong immunity to the specific viral variant with which they were infected.

== Diagnosis ==
A presumptive diagnosis of RHD can often be made based on clinical presentation, infection pattern within a population, and post mortem lesions. Definitive diagnosis requires detection of the virus. As most caliciviruses cannot be grown in cell culture, antibody and nucleic acid based methods of viral detection are often used.

Complete blood counts from rabbits with RHD often show low levels of white blood cells and platelets, and chemistry panels show elevated liver enzymes. Evidence of liver failure may also be present, including increased bile acids and bilirubin, and decreased glucose and cholesterol. Prolonged prothrombin and activated partial thromboplastin times are typical. Urinalysis can show bilirubinuria, proteinuria, and high urinary GGT.

The classic post mortem lesion seen in rabbits with RHD is extensive hepatic necrosis. Multifocal hemorrhages, splenomegaly, bronchopneumonia, pulmonary hemorrhage or edema, and myocardial necrosis may sometimes also be seen.

RT-qPCR tests are a commonly used and accurate testing modality for RNA-based viruses. Other tests used include enzyme-linked immunosorbent assay, electron microscopy, immunostaining, Western blot, and in situ hybridization. The tissue of choice for molecular testing is fresh or frozen liver, as it usually contains the largest numbers of virus, but if this is not available, spleen and serum can also be used. Identification of the strain of RHDV is needed so vaccination protocols can be adjusted accordingly.

== Prevention and control ==
=== Vaccines ===
A number of vaccines available against RHD are sold in countries where the disease is endemic. All provide 12 months of protection against RHD viruses. Because RHD viruses cannot normally be grown in vitro, how these vaccines are produced is affected. Inactivated RHD vaccines, including Eravac, Felavac, and Cylap, are "liver-derived", meaning that laboratory rabbits are intentionally infected with RHD and their livers and spleens harvested to make vaccines. Each rabbit used results in the production of thousands of vaccine doses. This has led to controversy among rabbit lovers, who question the ethics of some rabbits having to die to protect others but is not an issue where rabbits are primarily farmed for meat. Another method of reproducing the virus is through recombinant technology, where antigenic portions of the RHD viruses are inserted into viruses that can be grown in culture. This is the method used to create Nobivac Myxo-RHD PLUS.

Vaccines against only the classic RHDVa strain are: Cylap RCD Vaccine, made by Zoetis, protects rabbits from two different strains of RHDVa (v351 and K5) that are used for wild rabbit control in Australia. CUNIPRAVAC RHD, manufactured by HIPRA, protects against the RHDVa strains found in Europe. Nobivac Myxo-RHD, made by MSD Animal Health, is a live myxoma-vectored vaccine that offers one-year duration of immunity against both RHDVa and myxomatosis.

Vaccines against only the newer RHDV2 strain are: Eravac vaccine, manufactured by HIPRA, protects rabbits against RHDV2 for a year.

Vaccines that protect against both RHDVa and RHDV2 strains include: Filavac VHD K C+V, manufactured by Filavie, protects against both classical RHDVa and RHDV-2. It is available in single dose and multidose vials. A soon-to-be-released vaccine from MSD Animal Health, Nobivac Myxo-RHD PLUS, is a live recombinant vector vaccine active against both RHDVa and RHDV2, as well as myxomatosis.

Countries in which RHD is not considered endemic may place restrictions on importation of RHDV vaccines. Importation of these vaccines into the United States can only be done with the approval of the United States Department of Agriculture and the appropriate state veterinarian.

=== Disinfection ===
Caliciviruses are stable in the environment and difficult to inactivate. Products commonly used for household disinfection such as Clorox and Lysol disinfecting wipes do not work against these viruses. One effective option is to wipe down surfaces with a 10% bleach solution, allowing 10 minutes of contact time before rinsing. Other disinfectants shown to work include 10% sodium hydroxide, 2% One-Stroke Environ, Virkon S, Clorox Healthcare Bleach Germicidal Wipes, Trifectant, Rescue, and hydrogen peroxide cleaners. Surface debris must always be mechanically removed prior to disinfection. A list of disinfectants that are effective against calicivirus (in this case norovirus) can be found on the Environmental Protection Agency's website. Studies have shown that many quaternary ammonium compound based disinfectants do not inactivate caliciviruses.

=== Quarantine and other measures ===
Because of the highly infectious nature of the disease, strict quarantine is necessary when outbreaks occur. Depopulation, disinfection, vaccination, surveillance, and quarantine are the only way to properly and effectively eradicate the disease. Deceased rabbits must be removed immediately and discarded in a safe manner. Surviving rabbits should be quarantined or humanely euthanized. Test rabbits may be used to monitor the virus on vaccinated farms.

== Geographic distribution ==
RHD is primarily a disease affecting European rabbits, which are native to the Iberian Peninsula and are found in the wild in much of Western Europe. Domesticated breeds are farmed throughout the world for meat and fur, and are becoming increasingly popular pets. European rabbits have been introduced to and become feral and sometimes invasive in Australia, New Zealand, Chile, Argentina, and various islands.

RHD was first reported in 1984 in the People's Republic of China. Since then, RHD has spread to over 40 countries in Africa, the Americas, Asia, Europe, and Oceania, and is endemic in most parts of the world.

In 2010, a new virus variant called rabbit hemorrhagic disease virus 2 (RHDV2) emerged in France. RHDV2 has since spread from France to the rest of Europe, Great Britain, Australia, and New Zealand. Outbreaks started occurring in the United States and Vancouver Island Canada in 2019.

=== Asia ===
==== China ====
The first reported outbreak of RHD caused by RHDVa occurred in 1984 in the Jiangsu Province of the Mainland China. The outbreak occurred in a group of Angora rabbits that had been imported from Germany. The cause of the disease was determined to be a small, nonenveloped RNA virus. An inactivated vaccine was developed that proved effective in preventing disease. In less than a year, the disease spread over an area of 50,000 km^{2} in China and killed 140 million domestic rabbits.

==== South Korea ====
South Korea was the next country to report RHD outbreaks following the importation of rabbit fur from Mainland China. RHD has since spread to and become endemic in many countries in Asia, including India and the Middle East.

=== Europe ===
From China, RHDVa spread westward to Europe. The first report of RHD in Europe came from in Italy in 1986. From there, it spread to much of Europe. Spain's first reported case was in 1988, and France, Belgium, and Scandinavia followed in 1990. Spain experienced a large die-off of wild rabbits, which in turn caused a population decline in predators that normally ate rabbits, including the Iberian lynx and Spanish imperial eagle.

==== United Kingdom ====
RHD caused by RHDVa was reported for the first time in the United Kingdom in 1992. This initial epidemic was brought under control in the late 1990s using a combination of vaccination, strict biosecurity, and good husbandry. The newer viral strain RHDV2 was first detected in England and Wales in 2014, and soon spread to Scotland and Ireland.

==== Finland ====
RHD was detected for the first time in Finland in 2016. The outbreak occurred in feral European rabbits, and genetic testing identified the viral strain as RHDV2. Cases of viral transmission to domesticated pet rabbits have been confirmed, and vaccinating rabbits has been recommended.

=== Oceania ===
==== Australia ====
In 1991, a strain of the RHDVa virus, Czech CAPM 351RHDV, was imported to Australia under strict quarantine conditions to research the safety and usefulness of the virus if it were used as a biological control agent against Australia and New Zealand's rabbit pest problem. Testing of the virus was undertaken on Wardang Island in Spencer Gulf off the coast of the Yorke Peninsula, South Australia. In 1995, the virus escaped quarantine and subsequently killed 10 million rabbits within two months of its release. In March 2017, a new Korean strain known as RHDV K5 was successfully released in a deliberate manner after almost a decade of research. This strain was chosen in part because it functions better in cool, wet regions where the previous Calicivirus was less effective.

==== New Zealand ====
In July 1997, after considering over 800 public submissions, the New Zealand Ministry of Health decided not to allow RHDVa to be imported into New Zealand to control rabbit populations. However, in late August, RHDVa was confirmed to have been deliberately and illegally introduced to the Cromwell area of the South Island. An unsuccessful attempt was made by New Zealand officials to control the spread of the disease. It was, however, being intentionally spread, and several farmers (notably in the Mackenzie Basin area) admitted to processing rabbits that had died from the disease in kitchen blenders for further spreading. Had the disease been introduced at a better time, control of the population would have been more effective, but it was released after breeding had commenced for the season, and rabbits under 2 weeks old at the time of the introduction were resistant to the disease. These young rabbits were, therefore, able to survive and breed rabbit numbers back up. Ten years on, rabbit populations (in the Mackenzie Basin in particular) are beginning to reach near preplague proportions once again, though they have not yet returned to pre-RHD levels. Resistance to RHD in New Zealand rabbits has led to the widespread use of Compound 1080 (Sodium fluoroacetate). The government and department of conservation are having to increase their use of 1080 to protect reserve land from rabbits and preserve the gains made in recent years through the use of RHD.

=== North and South America ===
==== United States and Canada ====
Isolated outbreaks of RHDVa in domestic rabbits have occurred in the United States, the first of which was in Iowa in 2000. In 2001, outbreaks occurred in Utah, Illinois, and New York. More recent outbreaks of RHDVa have occurred in 2005 in Indiana and 2018 in Pennsylvania. Each of these outbreaks was contained and was the result of separate but indeterminable introductions of RHDVa. RHDVa does not affect the native cottontail and jackrabbits in the United States, so the virus did not become endemic.

The first report of RHDV2 virus in North America was on a farm in Québec, in 2016. In 2018, a larger outbreak occurred in feral European rabbits in British Columbia both in Delta and on Vancouver Island. The disease was confirmed later that year in a pet rabbit in Ohio. In July 2019, the first case of RHDV2 in Washington was confirmed in a pet rabbit from Orcas Island. RHDV2 have been reported in domestic rabbits in Washington and New York.

In 2020, outbreaks of the disease in domestic rabbits, as well as cottontail rabbits and hares, have been reported in Arizona, New Mexico, Colorado, Texas, Nevada, California and Utah. Affected wildlife include mountain cottontail rabbits (Sylvilagus nutalli), desert cottontail rabbits (S. audubonii), antelope jackrabbits (L. alleni), and black-tailed jackrabbits (L. californicus). The virus circulating in the Southwest United States is distinct from the RHDV2 isolated from New York, Washington, Ohio, and British Columbia, Canada. The sources of these outbreaks are unknown.

In June 2022, a case occurred in Hawaii. It was first confirmed in a neutered hare on Maui. Department of Agriculture inspectors began testing after becoming aware of 9 rabbit deaths on a Maui farm.

On Jan. 20, 2026 the North Carolina Department of Agriculture & Consumer Services (NCDAC) said a domestic rabbit tested positive for rabbit hemorrhagic disease virus type 2 (RHDV2) in Dare County marking the first case of fatal rabbit disease in North Carolina.

==== Mexico ====
Mexico experienced an outbreak of RHDVa in domestic rabbits from 1989 to 1991, presumably following the importation of rabbit meat from the People's Republic of China. Strict quarantine and depopulation measures were able to eradicate the virus, and the country was officially declared to be RHD-free in 1993.

A second outbreak of RHD in domestic rabbits began in the state of Chihuahua in April 2020 and has since spread to Sonora, Baja California, Baja California Sur, Coahuila, and Durango. As of 2021 and 2022, a RHD outbreak occurred in Hidalgo and the Mexico City Metropolitan Area. A mass disinfectant and vaccination campaign was ordered by the Directorate of Agricultural Development and over 390 thousand rabbits have received vaccinations. It has been confirmed ever since then, that the disease is present In Central Mexico.

==== Cuba ====
Since 1993, RHDVa has been endemic in Cuba. Four epizootics involving domesticated rabbits were reported in 1993, 1997, 2000–2001, and 2004–2005. As consequence, thousands of rabbits have died or have been slaughtered each time.

==== Bolivia ====
The virus is also believed to be present in Bolivia.

== See also ==
- Rabbits in Australia
