= A. albus =

A. albus may refer to:

- Abyssicoccus albus, a species of bacterium in the genus Abyssicoccus
- Acanthodrilus albus, a species of earthworm in the family Acanthodrilidae
- Acanthus albus, a species of flowering plant in the genus Acanthus
- Achrysocharoides albus, a species of wasp in the genus Achrysocharoides
- Acrostalagmus albus, a species of fungus in the genus Acrostalagmus
- Aduncothrips albus, a species of thrip in the family Aeolothripidae
- Aegires albus, a species of sea slug
- Agarivorans albus, a species of bacterium
- Algihabitans albus, a species of bacterium in the family Rhodospirillaceae
- Agromyces albus, a species of bacterium
- Amaranthus albus, a species of flowering plant
- Amorphophallus albus, a species of flowering plant
- Amphithalamus albus, a species of snail
- Amphorocalyx albus, a species of flowering plant in the genus Amphorocalyx
- Anthonomus albus, a species of weevil in the genus Anthonomus
- Aonidomytilus albus, a species of scale insect in the family Diaspididae
- Aphytis albus, a species of wasp in the genus Aphytis
- Apseudocnus albus, a species of sea cucumber in the family Cucumariidae
- Aquibacillus albus, a species of bacterium
- Aquariibacter albus, a species of bacterium in the order Burkholderiales
- Armadillo albus, a species of isopod in the genus Armadillo
- Armadilloniscus albus, a species of isopod in the genus Armadilloniscus
- Arrhenechthites albus, a species of flowering plant in the genus Arrhenechthites
- Ascolectus albus, a species of fungus in the family Saccardiaceae
- Ascopolyporus albus, a species of fungus in the genus Ascopolyporus
- Asparagus albus, a species of flowering plant
- Asphodelus albus, a species of flowering plant
- Asterodon albus, a species of fungus in the genus Asterodon
- Asteropus albus, a species of sponge in the family Ancorinidae
- Atracodes albus, a species of planthopper in the family Flatidae
- Astragalus albus, a species of flowering plant in the genus Astragalus
