= 2014 Hamilton Tiger-Cats season =

Season of Canadian Football League team the Hamilton Tiger-Cats

- General manager: Kent Austin
- Head coach: Kent Austin
- Home stadium: Ron Joyce Stadium; Tim Hortons Field

Results
- Record: 9–9
- Division place: 1st, East
- Playoffs: Lost Grey Cup

Uniform

The 2014 Hamilton Tiger-Cats season was the 57th season for the team in the Canadian Football League (CFL) and their 65th overall. The Tiger-Cats finished in first place in the East Division for the first time since 1998 and finished with a 9–9 record. The Tiger-Cats advanced to and lost the Grey Cup game for the second year in a row, this time to the Calgary Stampeders by a score of 20–16.

The team returned to Hamilton after playing one season in Guelph; the team split its games between Ron Joyce Stadium and the new Tim Hortons Field. There were significant delays in the construction of Tim Horton's Field, resulting in delays using the stadium and, subsequently, portions of the venue when it did open, resulting in a reduced seating capacity for the inaugural game against the Toronto Argonauts on Labor Day weekend. The aforementioned delays resulted in a lawsuit that was unresolved for several years thereafter, resulting in missed opportunities to host the Grey Cup Championship.

== Offseason ==
=== Stadium ===
The Tiger-Cats played in a brand new stadium for the first time in franchise history, playing at the newly constructed Tim Hortons Field at the site of their old stadium, Ivor Wynne Stadium. Tim Hortons Field was due to be completed by June 30, 2014, and, consequently, the team played their preseason home game at McMaster University's Ron Joyce Stadium. The Tiger-Cats will play their first three regular season games on the road and were scheduled to open Tim Hortons Field in week 5 on July 26, 2014 against the expansion Ottawa Redblacks.

However, on July 7, 2014, the Tiger-Cats announced that the construction of Tim Hortons Field was behind schedule and that the team's first two regular-season home games (later extended to three) would, as a matter of necessity, also be moved to Ron Joyce Stadium. The new stadium, still not yet complete with only 18,000 seats ready for use, opened in time for the Labour Day Classic (again as a matter of necessity because of Ontario University Athletics' tradition that also plays games on Labour Day). The stadium was fully complete by October.

=== CFL draft ===
The 2014 CFL draft took place on May 13, 2014. The Tiger-Cats had six selections in the seven-round draft, but moved up and down in positions due to trades with other clubs. The club acquired an additional second round selection and moved down one spot in the first round after completing a trade with Saskatchewan for Shomari Williams and Josh Bartel. The team then traded both second round selections during the draft for the first round selection they had traded to Saskatchewan. The team also gave up a third round selection for Geoff Tisdale and another sixth round selection. Finally, the Tiger-Cats traded their fourth round selection for fullback Dahrran Diedrick.

Round	Pick	Player	Position	School/Club team
1	8	Beau Landry	LB	Western Ontario
1	9	Evan Gill	DL	Manitoba
5	44	Christopher Johnson	LB	Toronto
6	52	Mathieu Girard	DL	Montreal
6	53	Stephen Mawa	DL	British Columbia
7	62	Martin Pesek	DL	Acadia

== Preseason ==
Week	Date	Kickoff	Opponent	Results		TV	Venue	Attendance	Summary
Week	Date	Kickoff	Opponent	Score	Record	TV	Venue	Attendance	Summary
A	Bye								
B	Sat, June 14	3:00 p.m. EDT	vs. Montreal Alouettes	W 28–23	1–0	None	Ron Joyce Stadium	5,573	Recap
C	Thur, June 19	7:00 p.m. EDT	at Toronto Argonauts	L 23–41	1–1	None	Varsity Stadium	5,216	Recap

== Regular season ==
=== Season standings ===
East Division
Team	GP	W	L	T	PF	PA	Pts	
Hamilton Tiger-Cats	18	9	9	0	417	395	18	Details
Montreal Alouettes	18	9	9	0	360	394	18	Details
Toronto Argonauts	18	8	10	0	450	456	16	Details
Ottawa Redblacks	18	2	16	0	278	465	4	Details

=== Season schedule ===
Week	Date	Kickoff	Opponent	Results		TV	Venue	Attendance	Summary
Week	Date	Kickoff	Opponent	Score	Record	TV	Venue	Attendance	Summary
1	Sun, June 29	7:00 p.m. EDT	at Saskatchewan Roughriders	L 10–31	0–1	TSN/RDS2	Mosaic Stadium	19,285	Recap
2	Fri, July 4	10:00 p.m. EDT	at Edmonton Eskimos	L 24–28	0–2	TSN	Commonwealth Stadium	30,714	Recap
3	Bye								
4	Fri, July 18	10:00 p.m. EDT	at Calgary Stampeders	L 7–10	0–3	TSN/ESPN2	McMahon Stadium	27,546	Recap
5	Sat, July 26	7:00 p.m. EDT	vs. Ottawa Redblacks	W 33–23	1–3	TSN/RDS	Ron Joyce Stadium	6,500	Recap
6	Thur, July 31	7:00 p.m. EDT	vs. Winnipeg Blue Bombers	L 26–27	1–4	TSN/RDS2	Ron Joyce Stadium	6,500	Recap
7	Fri, Aug 8	10:00 p.m. EDT	at BC Lions	L 29–36	1–5	TSN	BC Place	24,236	Recap
8	Sat, Aug 16	3:00 p.m. EDT	vs. Calgary Stampeders	L 20–30	1–6	TSN	Ron Joyce Stadium	6,500	Recap
9	Bye								
10	Mon, Sept 1	1:00 p.m. EDT	vs. Toronto Argonauts	W 13–12	2–6	TSN	Tim Hortons Field	18,135	Recap
11	Sun, Sept 7	1:00 p.m. EDT	at Montreal Alouettes	L 31–38	2–7	TSN/RDS/ESPN	Molson Stadium	20,551	Recap
12	Sun, Sept 14	1:00 p.m. EDT	vs. Saskatchewan Roughriders	W 28–3	3–7	TSN	Tim Hortons Field	18,135	Recap
13	Sat, Sept 20	7:00 p.m. EDT	vs. Edmonton Eskimos	W 25–23	4–7	TSN	Tim Hortons Field	18,135	Recap
14	Sat, Sept 27	6:30 p.m. EDT	at Winnipeg Blue Bombers	W 16–11	5–7	TSN	Investors Group Field	28,534	Recap
15	Sat, Oct 4	7:00 p.m. EDT	vs. BC Lions	W 19–17	6–7	TSN	Tim Hortons Field	20,125	Recap
16	Fri, Oct 10	7:00 p.m. EDT	at Toronto Argonauts	L 33–34	6–8	TSN	Rogers Centre	17,811	Recap
17	Fri, Oct 17	7:00 p.m. EDT	vs. Ottawa Redblacks	W 16–6	7–8	TSN/RDS2	Tim Hortons Field	20,125	Recap
18	Sat, Oct 25	4:00 p.m. EDT	at Toronto Argonauts	L 24–26	7–9	TSN/RDS2	Rogers Centre	19,258	Recap
19	Fri, Oct 31	7:30 p.m. EDT	at Ottawa Redblacks	W 34–25	8–9	TSN/RDS2	TD Place Stadium	24,101	Recap
20	Sat, Nov 8	4:00 p.m. EST	vs. Montreal Alouettes	W 29–15	9–9	TSN/RDS	Tim Hortons Field	24,186	Recap

== Post-season ==
=== Schedule ===
Game	Date	Kickoff	Opponent	Results		TV	Venue	Attendance	Summary
Game	Date	Kickoff	Opponent	Score	Record	TV	Venue	Attendance	Summary
East Semi-Final	Bye								
East Final	Sun, Nov 23	1:00 p.m. EST	vs. Montreal Alouettes	W 40–24	1–0	TSN/RDS/ESPN	Tim Hortons Field	24,334	Recap
102nd Grey Cup	Sun, Nov 30	6:00 p.m. EST	Calgary Stampeders	L 16–20	1–1	TSN/RDS/ESPN2	BC Place	52,056	Recap

== Roster ==
2014 Hamilton Tiger-Cats final roster
Quarterbacks: 4 Zach Collaros; 8 Jeremiah Masoli; 6 Stephen McGee; Running backs: 2 Nic Grigsby; 26 Mossis Madu; 46 C. O. Primé; Receivers: 16 Brandon Banks; 81 Matt Coates; 83 Andy Fantuz; 11 Sam Giguère; 84 Bakari Grant; 14 Terrell Sinkfield; 17 Luke Tasker	Offensive linemen: 67 Peter Dyakowski G; 60 Joel Figueroa T; 68 Mike Filer C; 50 Jake Olson T; 55 Tim O'Neill G/C; 69 Landon Rice G; 59 Brian Simmons G/T; Defensive linemen: 99 Mike Atkinson DT; 45 Arnaud Gascon-Nadon DE; 98 Linden Gaydosh DT; 72 Bryan Hall DT; 5 Justin Hickman DE; 97 Ted Laurent DT; 40 Eric Norwood DE	Linebackers: 41 Erik Harris; 37 Beau Landry; 21 Simoni Lawrence; 33 Frédéric Plesius; 44 Taylor Reed; Defensive backs: 3 Marc Beswick; 27 Delvin Breaux; 28 Craig Butler; 35 Mike Daly; 29 Ed Gainey; 43 Neil King; 48 Kyle Miller; 0 Rico Murray; 22 Courtney Stephen; 9 Brandon Stewart	Special teams: 47 Aaron Crawford LS; 7 Justin Medlock K/P; Reserve roster: 88 Johnny Aprile SB; 63 Marc Dile T; Practice roster: 49 Christopher Johnson LB; 36 Pawel Kruba LB; 12 Brett Lauther K; 19 Quincy McDuffie WR; 39 Dan Molls LB; 71 Adewale Ojomo DE; 18 Sam Ojuri RB; 37 Julian Posey DB; 92 Sam Scott DE	Injured list: 38 Marcellus Bowman LB; 95 Brian Bulcke DT; 42 David Caldwell LB; 24 Michael Coe DB; 94 Antonio Coleman DE; 20 Emanuel Davis DB; 82 Greg Ellingson SB; 51 Marc-Antoine Fortin DE; 32 C. J. Gable RB; 2 Jacory Harris QB; 96 Hasan Hazime DT; 86 Cary Koch WR; 13 Dan LeFevour QB; 56 Jeremy Lewis T; 65 Joel Reinders T/G; 64 Carson Rockhill G; 90 Brandon Thurmond DE; 66 Greg Wojt G; Italics indicate International player

== Coaching staff ==
2014 Hamilton Tiger-Cats staff
Front office: Owner – Bob Young; President and coo – Glenn Gibson; Vice president of football operations and general manager – Kent Austin; Director of football operations – Shawn Burke; Director of canadian scouting – Drew Allemang; Director of U.S. Scouting – Eric Tillman; Scouting and football administration coordinator – Spencer Zimmerman; Video co-ordinator – Matt Allemang; Head coach: Head coach – Kent Austin; Offensive coaches: Offensive coordinator and receivers – Tommy Condell; Running backs and offensive quality control – Corey Grant; Offensive line – Allen Rudolph	Defensive coaches: Defensive coordinator – Orlondo Steinauer; Assistant defensive backs – James Stanley; Linebackers – Jeff Reinebold; Defensive line – Dennis McPhee; Assistant defensive – Marcello Simmons; Special teams coaches: Special teams coordinator – Jeff Reinebold; Assistant special teams – John Zamberlin; Assistant special teams – Marcello Simmons; → Coaching staff
