= Jeotgalicoccus pinnipedialis =

Scientific classification
- Domain: Bacteria
- Kingdom: Bacillati
- Phylum: Bacillota
- Class: Bacilli
- Order: Bacillales
- Family: Staphylococcaceae
- Genus: Jeotgalicoccus
- Species: J. pinnipedialis

Binomial name
- Jeotgalicoccus pinnipedialis Hoyles et al. 2004

Species of bacterium

Jeotgalicoccus pinnipedialis is a gram-positive bacterium. It belongs to the Staphylococcaceae. The cells are coccoid. It was found in the swab of the mouth of a Southern elephant seal.
