= Jeotgalicoccus aerolatus =

Scientific classification
- Domain: Bacteria
- Kingdom: Bacillati
- Phylum: Bacillota
- Class: Bacilli
- Order: Bacillales
- Family: Staphylococcaceae
- Genus: Jeotgalicoccus
- Species: J. aerolatus

Binomial name
- Jeotgalicoccus aerolatus Martin et al. 2011

Species of bacterium

Jeotgalicoccus aerolatus is a species of bacteria in the family Staphylococcaceae. A strain of this species was originally isolated from the air on a turkey farm and is closely related to Jeotgalicoccus halotolerans.
