= Jeotgalicoccus coquinae =

Scientific classification
- Domain: Bacteria
- Kingdom: Bacillati
- Phylum: Bacillota
- Class: Bacilli
- Order: Bacillales
- Family: Staphylococcaceae
- Genus: Jeotgalicoccus
- Species: J. coquinae

Binomial name
- Jeotgalicoccus coquinae Martin et al. 2011

Species of bacterium

Jeotgalicoccus coquinae is a species of bacteria in the family Staphylococcaceae. A strain of this species was found during a microbiological examination of poultry houses. It was originally isolated from coquina, which is used as a food supplement for female ducks. Jeotgalicoccus coquinae is closely related to Jeotgalicoccus psychrophilus.

The shape of the cells is coccoid with 1.5–2.0 μm in diameter. Jeotgalicoccus coquinae is part of the Gram-positive bacteria. The Oxidase test as well as the Catalase test is positive, revealing an aerobic respiratory metabolism.
