= Jeotgalicoccus nanhaiensis =

Scientific classification
- Domain: Bacteria
- Kingdom: Bacillati
- Phylum: Bacillota
- Class: Bacilli
- Order: Bacillales
- Family: Staphylococcaceae
- Genus: Jeotgalicoccus
- Species: J. nanhaiensis

Binomial name
- Jeotgalicoccus nanhaiensis Hoyles et al. 2004

Species of bacterium

Jeotgalicoccus nanhaiensis is a gram-positive bacterium. The cells of Jeotgalicoccus nanhaiensis are coccoid. Spores are not formed. It is not motile, which means that the species can not move under their own power itself.
