= Macrococcus canis =

Scientific classification
- Domain: Bacteria
- Kingdom: Bacillati
- Phylum: Bacillota
- Class: Bacilli
- Order: Caryophanales
- Family: Staphylococcaceae
- Genus: Macrococcus
- Species: M. canis

Binomial name
- Macrococcus canis Gobeli Brawand et al. 2017

Type strain
- CCUG 68920, DSM 101690, KM45013, CCOS969, KM 45013

Species of bacterium

Macrococcus canis is a Gram-positive bacterium from the genus of Macrococcus which has been isolated from the nose of a dog which had mucopurulent rhinitis in Switzerland.
