= Salinicoccus jeotgali =

Scientific classification
- Domain: Bacteria
- Kingdom: Bacillati
- Phylum: Bacillota
- Class: Bacilli
- Order: Bacillales
- Family: Staphylococcaceae
- Genus: Salinicoccus
- Species: S. jeotgali

Binomial name
- Salinicoccus jeotgali Aslam et al. 2007

Species of bacterium

Salinicoccus jeotgali is a bacterium, first isolated from jeotgal, hence its name. It is moderately halophilic, Gram-positive and coccus-shaped, designated strain S2R53-5^{T} (=KCTC 13030^{T} =LMG 23640^{T}).
