= Nosocomiicoccus =

Scientific classification
- Domain: Bacteria
- Kingdom: Bacillati
- Phylum: Bacillota
- Class: Bacilli
- Order: Bacillales
- Family: Staphylococcaceae
- Genus: Nosocomiicoccus; Morais et al. 2008

Type species
- Nosocomiicoccus ampullae Morais et al. 2008

Species
- N. ampullae; N. massiliensis; "Ca. N. stercorigallinarum"

Genus of bacteria

Nosocomiicoccus is a genus of gram-positive cocci. The genus is a member of the family Staphylococcaceae. A common feature of all members of this family is their osmo- and halotolerance - the ability to grow at high salt concentrations.

== Genome ==
A draft full genome sequence of Nosocomiicoccus massiliensis is available in Genbank (accession CAVG000000000). The bacterial chromosome has an estimated size of about 1.650.00 nt, and a GC-content of 36.5%. About 1700 proteins are encoded on the chromosome, and about 1000 proteins have close orthologs in the sibling genera Macrococcus, Salinicoccus and Staphylococcus.

== Clinical importance ==
None of the species in this genus is known to be pathogenic to humans.

== Phylogeny ==
The currently accepted taxonomy is based on the List of Prokaryotic names with Standing in Nomenclature (LPSN) and National Center for Biotechnology Information (NCBI).

16S rRNA based LTP_10_2024

- Nosocomiicoccus
  - N. ampullae
  - N. massiliensis

120 marker proteins based GTDB 09-RS220

- Nosocomiicoccus
  - N. massiliensis Mishra et al. 2016
  - - N. ampullae Morais et al. 2008
    - "Ca. N. stercorigallinarum" Gilroy et al. 2021
