= Jeotgalicoccus huakuii =

Scientific classification
- Domain: Bacteria
- Kingdom: Bacillati
- Phylum: Bacillota
- Class: Bacilli
- Order: Bacillales
- Family: Staphylococcaceae
- Genus: Jeotgalicoccus
- Species: J. huakuii

Binomial name
- Jeotgalicoccus huakuii Guo et al. 2010

Species of bacterium

Jeotgalicoccus huakuii is a gram-positive bacterium. The cells are coccoid. It is moderately halophilic, (salt-tolerant) it grows in the presence of 0–23% NaCl, optimal values are 3 -8%. It belongs to the family Staphylococcaceae.
