= Jeotgalicoccus schoeneichii =

Scientific classification
- Domain: Bacteria
- Kingdom: Bacillati
- Phylum: Bacillota
- Class: Bacilli
- Order: Bacillales
- Family: Staphylococcaceae
- Genus: Jeotgalicoccus
- Species: J. schoeneichii

Binomial name
- Jeotgalicoccus schoeneichii Glaeser et al. 2016

Type strain
- CCM 8667, 140805-STR-02, LMG 29445

Species of bacterium

Jeotgalicoccus schoeneichii is a Gram-positive, non-spore-forming and non-motile bacterium from the genus Jeotgalicoccus which has been isolated from air from a pig barn from North Rhine-Westphalia in Germany.
