= Jeotgalicoccus halophilus =

Scientific classification
- Domain: Bacteria
- Kingdom: Bacillati
- Phylum: Bacillota
- Class: Bacilli
- Order: Bacillales
- Family: Staphylococcaceae
- Genus: Jeotgalicoccus
- Species: J. halophilus

Binomial name
- Jeotgalicoccus halophilus Liu et al. 2011

Species of bacterium

Jeotgalicoccus halophilus is a species of bacteria.

It is one of the phylum Bacillota; and it is categorized as a Gram-positive bacteria.

The species is halotolerant and it grows at NaCl content of 0.1 to 16% - its optimal values for growth are between 2 and 3%.

The cells are coccoid.

== Etymology ==
The genus name Jeotgalicoccus is derived from the Latin word "Jeotgalum" and refers to the locality of the first-described discovery, it was isolated from the Korean fish sauce Jeotgal. The species name refers to the halophile of the species.
