= Rsa RNA =

Rsa RNAs are non-coding RNAs found in the bacterium Staphylococcus aureus. The shared name comes from their discovery, and does not imply homology. Bioinformatics scans identified the 16 Rsa RNA families named RsaA-K and RsaOA-OG. Others, RsaOH-OX, were found thanks to an RNomic approach. Although the RNAs showed varying expression patterns, many of the newly discovered RNAs were shown to be Hfq-independent and most carried a C-rich motif (UCCC).

== RsaA ==
Represses the translation of the transcriptional regulator MgrA by binding to its mRNA, enhances biofilm formation and decreases bacterial virulence. Other mRNAs: including SsaA-like enzymes involved in peptidoglycan metabolism and the secreted anti-inflammatory FLIPr protein were validated as direct targets of RsaA.

== RsaE ==
The consensus secondary structure of RsaI (later renamed RsaOG) showing its pseudoknot. Boundaries were determined by RACE mapping in Staphylococcus aureus N315. Taken from Marchais et al., 2010 created in Varna.

RsaE is found in other members of the genus Staphylococcus such as Staphylococcus epidermidis and Staphylococcus saprophyticus and is the only Rsa RNA to be found outside of this genus, in Macrococcus caseolyticus and Bacillus. In Bacillus subtilis, RsaE had previously been identified as ncr22. RsaE is also consistently found downstream of PepF which codes for oligoendopeptidase F. The function of RsaE was discovered using gene knockout analysis and gene overexpression - it was found to regulate the expression of several enzymes involved in metabolism via antisense binding of their mRNA.

RsaE was shown to be regulated by the presence of nitric oxide (NO). In Bacillus subtilis it controls expression of genes with functions related to oxidative stress and oxidation-reduction reactions and it was renamed RoxS (for related to oxidative stress).

== RsaF ==
In S.aureus species RsaF is located in the same intergenic region as RsaE and overlaps with 3′ end of RsaE by approximately 20bp. In contrast to RsaE, RsaF and its upstream gene have only been identified in S.aureus species.

== RsaK ==
RsaK is found in the leader sequence of glcA mRNA which encodes an enzyme involved in the glucose-specific phosphotransferase system. RsaK also contains a conserved ribonucleic antiterminator system, as recognised by GclT protein.

== RsaI ==
RsaOG also renamed RsaI is thought to fine-tune the regulation of toxin or invasion mechanisms in S. aureus via trans-acting mechanisms. Its secondary structure contains a pseudoknot formed between two highly conserved unpaired sequences.

== Expression patterns ==
RsaD, E H and I were found to be highly expressed in S. aureus. Expression levels of other Rsa RNAs varied under various environmental conditions, for example RsaC was induced by cold shock and RsaA is induced in response to osmotic stress.

RsaE and RsaF genes overlap in S.aureus species but appear to have opposite expression patterns. Transcriptional interference due to an overlap between a σ^{A} recognition motif and a potential σ^{B} binding site is proposed as a mechanism causing the differential expression of the two transcripts

== See also ==
- RsaOG
