= Staphylococcus agnetis =

Scientific classification
- Domain: Bacteria
- Kingdom: Bacillati
- Phylum: Bacillota
- Class: Bacilli
- Order: Bacillales
- Family: Staphylococcaceae
- Genus: Staphylococcus
- Species: S. agnetis

Binomial name
- Staphylococcus agnetis Taponen et al. 2012

Species of bacterium

Staphylococcus agnetis is a Gram positive, coagulase-variable member of the bacterial genus Staphylococcus. Strains of this species were originally isolated from the milk and teats of cows with mastitis. This species is not known to infect humans.

The genome of S. agnetis isolate CBMRN 20813338 has been sequenced and was found to be 2.4 megabases long with a GC content of 35.79%.
