= History of the Washington Nationals =

The Washington Nationals are a Major League Baseball team formed in 1969 as the Montreal Expos. In 2005, the Expos moved to Washington, D.C., and were renamed the Nationals. The franchise won the National League pennant in 2019, and has won its division five times. They won the World Series in 2019 against the Astros in game 7.

== History ==
=== Montreal Expos ===
The Montreal Expos joined the National League in 1969, along with the San Diego Padres, with a majority share held by Charles Bronfman, a major shareholder in Seagram. Named after the Expo 67 World's Fair, the Expos' initial home was Jarry Park. Managed by Gene Mauch, the team lost 110 games in their first season, coincidentally matching the Padres inaugural win–loss record, and continued to struggle during their first decade with sub-.500 seasons.

Starting in 1977, the team's home venue was Montreal's Olympic Stadium, built for the 1976 Summer Olympics. Two years later, the team won a franchise-high 95 games, finishing second in the National League East. The Expos began the 1980s with a core group of young players, including catcher Gary Carter, outfielders Tim Raines and Andre Dawson, third baseman Tim Wallach, and pitchers Steve Rogers and Bill Gullickson. The team won its only division championship in the strike-shortened split season of 1981, ending its season with a three games to two loss to the Los Angeles Dodgers in the National League Championship Series.

The team spent most of the 1980s in the middle of the NL East pack, finishing in third or fourth place in eight out of nine seasons from 1982 to 1990. Buck Rodgers was hired as manager before the 1985 season and guided the Expos to a .500 or better record five times in six years, with the highlight coming in 1987, when they won 91 games. They finished third, but were just four games behind the division-winning Cardinals.

Bronfman sold the team to a consortium of owners in 1991, with Claude Brochu as the managing general partner. Rodgers, at that time second only to Gene Mauch in number of Expos games managed, was replaced partway through the 1991 season. In May 1992, Felipe Alou, a member of the Expos organization since 1976, was promoted to field manager, becoming the first Dominican-born manager in MLB history. Alou would become the leader in Expos games managed, while guiding the team to winning records, including 1994, when the Expos, led by a talented group of players including Larry Walker, Moisés Alou, Marquis Grissom and Pedro Martínez, had the best record in the major leagues until the 1994–95 Major League Baseball strike forced the cancellation of the remainder of the season. After the disappointment of 1994, Expos management began shedding its key players, and the team's fan support dwindled.

Brochu sold control of the team to Jeffrey Loria in 1999, but Loria failed to close on a plan to build a new downtown ballpark, and did not reach an agreement on television and English radio broadcast contracts for the 2000 season, reducing the team's media coverage.

==== 2001 failed contraction ====
In November 2001, Major League Baseball's owners voted 28–2 to contract the league by two teams—according to various sources, the Expos and the Minnesota Twins, both of which reportedly voted against contraction. Subsequently, the Boston Red Sox were sold to a partnership led by John W. Henry, owner of the Florida Marlins. In order to clear the way for Henry's group to assume ownership of the Red Sox, Henry sold the Marlins to Loria, and baseball purchased the Expos from Loria. However, as the Metropolitan Sports Facilities Commission, operator of the Metrodome, won an injunction requiring the Twins to play there in 2002, MLB was unable to disband only one team, and so had to keep the Twins and Expos as part of the regular season schedule. In the collective bargaining agreement signed with the Major League Baseball Players Association (MLBPA) in August 2002, contraction was prohibited until the end of the contract in 2006.

=== Creation of the Nationals ===
With contraction no longer an option for the immediate term, MLB began looking for a relocation site for the Expos. Some of the choices included Oklahoma City, Oklahoma; Washington, D.C.; San Juan, Puerto Rico; Monterrey, Mexico; Portland, Oregon; somewhere in Northern Virginia such as Arlington or Dulles; Norfolk, Virginia; Las Vegas; and Charlotte, North Carolina. Washington and Virginia emerged as the front-runners.

In both 2003 and 2004, the Expos played 22 of their home games in San Juan, Puerto Rico at the Hiram Bithorn Stadium, and the remaining 59 in Montreal.

On September 29, 2004, MLB announced that the Expos would move to Washington, D.C., in 2005.

The Expos played their final game on October 3 at Shea Stadium, losing by a score of 8–1 against the New York Mets, the same opponent that the Expos first faced at its start, 35 years earlier. On November 15, a lawsuit by the former team owners against MLB and former majority owner Jeffrey Loria was struck down by arbitrators, bringing to an end all legal actions that would impede a move. The owners of the other MLB teams approved the move to Washington in a 28–1 vote on December 3 (Baltimore Orioles owner Peter Angelos cast the sole dissenting vote).

=== Washington baseball history revived ===
Numerous professional baseball teams have called Washington, D.C. home. The Washington Senators, a founding member of the American League, played in the nation's capital from 1901 to 1960 before moving to Minnesota and becoming the Twins. These Senators were owned by Clark Griffith and played in Griffith Stadium. With notable stars including Walter Johnson and Joe Cronin, the Senators won the 1924 World Series and pennants in 1925 and 1933, but were more often unsuccessful and moved to Minnesota for the 1961 season where the team was renamed the Minnesota Twins. A second Washington Senators team (1961–1971) had a winning record only once in their 11 years, though bright spots, such as slugger Frank Howard, earned the love of fans. The second Senators team moved to Arlington, Texas, for the 1972 season and changed their name to the Texas Rangers, and Washington spent the next 33 years without a baseball team.

Although there was some sentiment to revive the name Senators, political considerations factored into the choice of Nationals, a revival of the first American League franchise's "official" nickname used from 1905 to 1956. Politicians and others in the District of Columbia objected to the name Senators because the District of Columbia does not have voting representation in Congress. In addition, the Rangers still owned the rights to the Senators name, although the Nationals were able to acquire the rights to the curly "W" from the Rangers.

Washington, D.C., mayor Anthony A. Williams supported the name "Washington Grays", in honor of the Negro-league team the Homestead Grays (1929–1950), which had been based in Pittsburgh, but played many of their home games in Washington. In the end, the team owners chose the name "Washington Nationals", which had been the official name of the American League's Washington Senators from 1905 to 1956.

=== Opposition from the Orioles ===
The move was announced despite opposition from Peter Angelos, owner of the nearby Baltimore Orioles, who infamously announced "There are no baseball fans in Washington, D.C. That's a fiction." Since 1972, the Orioles had been the only MLB franchise in the Baltimore–Washington Metropolitan Area, which he considered a single market. Angelos contended that the Orioles would suffer financially if another team were allowed to enter the market, although the Orioles and the Washington Senators had shared the market successfully from 1954 through 1971, and three other major metropolitan areas (New York, Los Angeles, and Chicago, of roughly comparable size to Baltimore-Washington each have two MLB teams (in all cases, one each in the National and American Leagues). This reasoning disturbed many in Washington who recalled that it was the Griffith family, owners of the Washington Senators, who allowed the St. Louis Browns to move to Baltimore and become the Orioles in 1954 in the first place.

On March 31, 2005, Angelos and Major League Baseball struck a deal to protect the Orioles against any financial harm the Nationals might present.

Under the terms of the deal, television and radio broadcast rights to Nationals games are handled by the Orioles franchise, which formed a new network (the Mid-Atlantic Sports Network) to produce and distribute the games for both franchises on both local affiliates and cable/satellite systems. MASN was not, however, immediately available on all cable providers, adding to the frustration of Nationals fans. In fact, most in the DC area missed almost the entirety of the Nationals' first two seasons. The deal with Angelos makes the Nationals the only major league baseball team that does not own its own broadcast rights.

=== The ballpark controversy ===
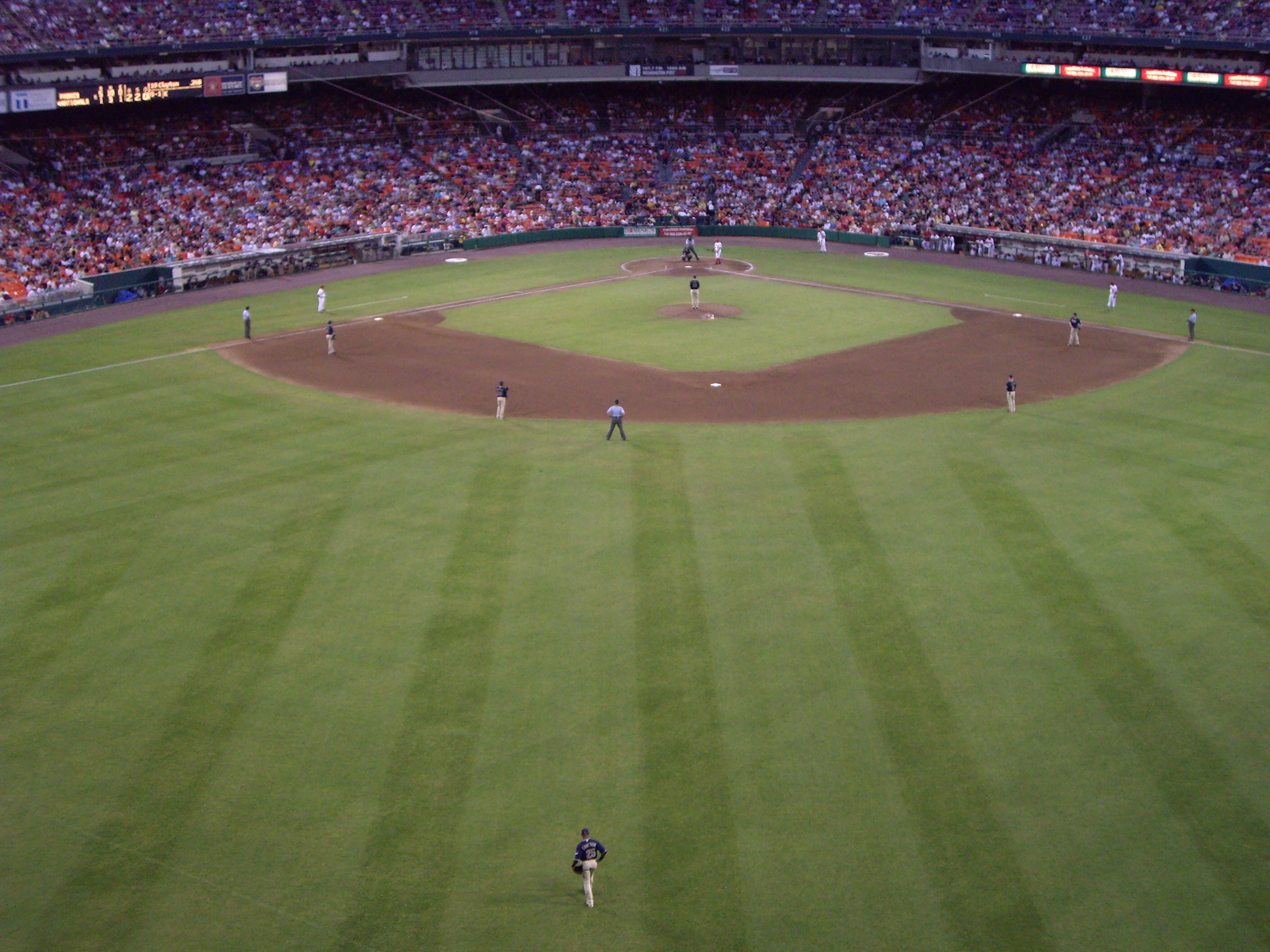
Nationals at bat against the San Diego Padres in RFK Stadium, 8 July 2006

The team's relocation to Washington was contingent on a financing plan for the Nationals' new stadium—this plan quickly became the subject of much debate on the Council of the District of Columbia.

Three Council members who supported Mayor Anthony Williams's plan were ousted in September 2004's Democratic party primary. In addition, an opinion poll conducted by The Washington Post during the peak of the controversy found that approximately two-thirds of District residents opposed the mayor's stadium plan.

Much of the controversy centered on the fact that the city would be helping finance a $581 million stadium without support from Maryland or Virginia or their counties, from which a large portion of the team's fan base would be drawn.

In December 2004, the move to Washington itself was called into doubt when the D.C. Council sought to change details of the stadium's financing. When the Council voted on December 14, 2004 to require 50 percent private financing for any new stadium, MLB ceased promotional activities for the Nationals and announced that they would consider looking for a new market.

Eventually, the council passed an amended plan on December 21, 2004 that proved slightly more financially favorable to the city, while remaining acceptable to MLB. Mayor Williams signed the stadium financing package on December 30.

During the 2005 season, a private financing plan for construction of the stadium was negotiated between the city and a syndicate of bankers led by Deutsche Bank. The negotiations of the details ran into another problem in November 2005. The bankers requested a letter of credit or other financial guarantee of $24 million, $6 million for each of four years, insuring payment of lease revenues against various risks including poor attendance and terrorism. The city requested that Major League Baseball provide this guarantee, which they were unwilling to do.

On December 22, 2005, the Washington Post reported that Major League Baseball had specifically instructed prospective owners not to offer to pay cost overruns on the stadium if they were selected as the owners. Bidders were also told not to communicate with the press about these issues.

In February 2006, the DC City Council imposed a $611 million cap on the stadium.

Finally, on March 5, Major League Baseball signed a lease for a new ballpark, agreeing to the city's $611 million cap. MLB also agreed to contribute $20 million toward the cost of the stadium, although it did not agree to cover stadium overruns. Further, MLB added the condition that excess ballpark tax revenue earmarked for debt service for the bonds be available for cost overruns. Two days later, on March 7 the DC City Council, by a vote of 9–4, approved a construction contract for a state-of-the-art stadium with a contemporary glass-and-stone facade, seats for 41,000 fans and a view of the U.S. Capitol, and affirmed its demand that public spending on the project be limited to $611 million. The votes were the final actions needed to satisfy the terms of the deal struck in September 2004, paving the way for the sale of the team.

Major League Baseball had agreed at the time that the franchise was moved to Washington to sell the team to an owner or ownership syndicate. Several dates for sale of the team were set and missed due to the legal wrangling regarding the building of the stadium. The delay was harshly criticized by city residents and leaders as reported in The Washington Post.

Selecting from a finalized group of three potential ownership syndicates, Major League Baseball announced in July 2006 that it had chosen the Lerner Enterprises group, led by billionaire real estate developer Theodore N. Lerner. The final sale price of the team was $450 million and the transfer of ownership was completed July 24, 2006. In late September 2006, Comcast finally agreed to broadcast the Nationals games.

==== New ownership and "The Plan" ====
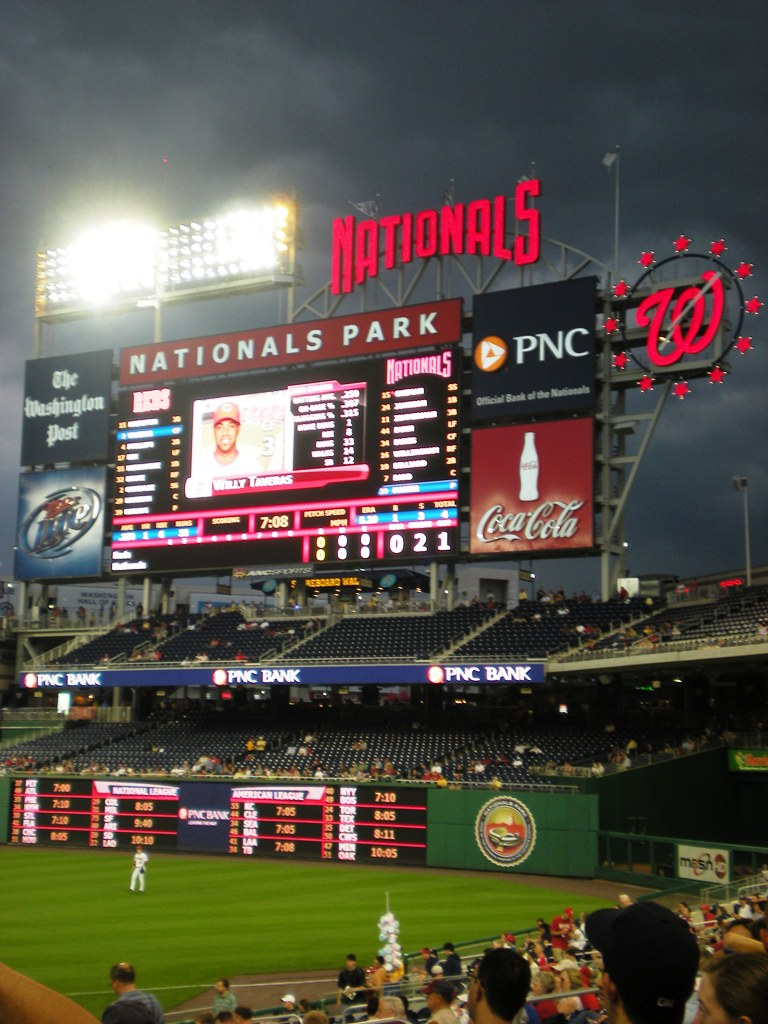
Washington Nationals versus the Cincinnati Reds in 2009 at Nationals Park

When Ted Lerner took over the club in mid-2006, he hired Stan Kasten as team president. Kasten was widely known as the architect of the Atlanta Braves before and during their run of 14 division titles (a streak only interrupted by the strike season of 1994, when the Braves ended the season behind the Montreal Expos – ironically, the Nationals' predecessor). Kasten was also the general manager or president of many other Atlanta-area sports teams, including the Atlanta Hawks and Atlanta Thrashers. "The Plan", as it became known, was a long-range rebuilding and restructuring of the team from the ground up. This plan included investing in the farm system and the draft, and having a suitable team to go along with their new stadium.

In the front office, the Nationals hired the former Arizona scouting director Mike Rizzo to be the vice president of baseball operations, second in charge under then-general manager Jim Bowden.

===== 2006–07 =====
At the end of the 2006 season, the Nationals did not re-sign free agent and star OF Alfonso Soriano. Soriano signed a $136 million contract with the Cubs, and Washington received two draft picks in return. OF José Guillén was also allowed to depart via free agency, and another high draft pick was obtained. Another high priced player, 2B/DH José Vidro, was traded to the Seattle Mariners for prospects OF Chris Snelling and RHP Emiliano Fruto. In mid-2006, the Nationals received OF Austin Kearns, 2B/SS Felipe López, and RHP Ryan Wagner from the Cincinnati Reds, giving up LHP Gary Majewski, LHP Bill Bray, SS Royce Clayton, 2B Brendan Harris and RHP Daryl Thompson. In August, they traded RHP Liván Hernández to the Arizona Diamondbacks for prospects LHP Matt Chico and RHP Garrett Mock. Other players traded or let go from the 2005 season were OF Preston Wilson, RHP Héctor Carrasco, IF Jamey Carroll, and OF Terrmel Sledge. The team also acquired pitching prospects Luis Atilano from Atlanta, Shairon Martis from San Francisco and Jhonny Núñez from the Dodgers. In 2006, they had two first-round draft picks, OF Chris Marrero, and RHP Colten Williams, and signed them both to developmental contracts. The Nationals also signed a 16-year-old Dominican shortstop, Esmailyn Gonzalez, for $1.4 million. Gonzalez was later revealed to be 20 years old at the time of his signing.

As for their farm system, the Nationals had a lot of work to do. By the spring of 2007, Baseball America had ranked the Nationals organization as dead last twice in four years in terms of minor league talent.

The Nationals had five of the first seventy picks in the 2007 Major League Baseball draft: their own two, and three compensation picks (two from losing Soriano, and one for Guillen). The team selected players that many considered to be four of the top 30 players available. Overall, the Nationals signed all of their top twenty draft picks. One of them, a first-round supplemental pick, Michael Burgess, was, by the end of the year, picked by Baseball America as the top prospect for the entire Gulf Coast League. Their rookie team, Vermont, sent three starting pitchers Colton Willems, Glenn Gibson, and Adrian Alaniz, and two position players, first baseman Bill Rhinehart, and outfielder Aaron Seuss to the New York–Penn League All-Star Game. By the end of the season, three Vermont pitchers landed in the Top 20 prospects for the New York–Penn League:

- 2007 second-round Jordan Zimmermann was ranked #5
- 2006 fourth round LHP Glenn Gibson (later traded to the Tampa Bay Rays for Elijah Dukes) was ranked #9
- 2006 first round RHP Colton Willems was ranked #11.

In the low-A South Atlantic League Top 20, two players made the list:

- Chris Marrero was ranked #5
- Justin Maxwell, who played a few games with the Nationals during September, was ranked at #18.

In addition, after having no teams in the Dominican Summer League, the Nationals fielded two clubs in 2007, one of which won the DSL Championships.

===== "The Plan" reloaded =====
In March 2009, just prior to Spring training, members of the Nationals' front office were implicated in a scandal involving the skimming of bonus money from the signing of Latin American players. José Rijo, a key adviser to Jim Bowden, was thought to be at the heart of this. As a result of this scandal, General Manager Jim Bowden resigned in Spring training of 2009, though he maintained he had done nothing wrong.

Mike Rizzo, the man serving as assistant G.M. for the previous two seasons, became the acting GM. Rizzo began to shape the team in a way that was contrary to Bowden's previous methods. While Bowden was known for "dumpster-diving", that is attempting to find serviceable players among the less-than-desired, Mike Rizzo sought players who achieved results. Bowden took risks on players with poor reputations (such as outfielders Elijah Dukes and Lastings Milledge), while Rizzo made a point out of making certain his players possessed "character" and would contribute to a cohesive clubhouse.

Despite the failures of Bowden's tenure, his last trade appeared to have been extremely beneficial to the Nationals, as he traded infielder Emilio Bonifacio and two minor-leaguers to the Marlins for starting pitcher Scott Olsen and outfielder Josh Willingham.

Rizzo's first major trade during the 2009 season as General Manager of the Nationals was to trade Lastings Milledge along with control-challenged reliever Joel Hanrahan to the Pirates in exchange for speedy outfielder Nyjer Morgan and left-handed relief pitcher Sean Burnett. Morgan was thought to be a great clubhouse presence as well as a slick fielder on the outfield grass.

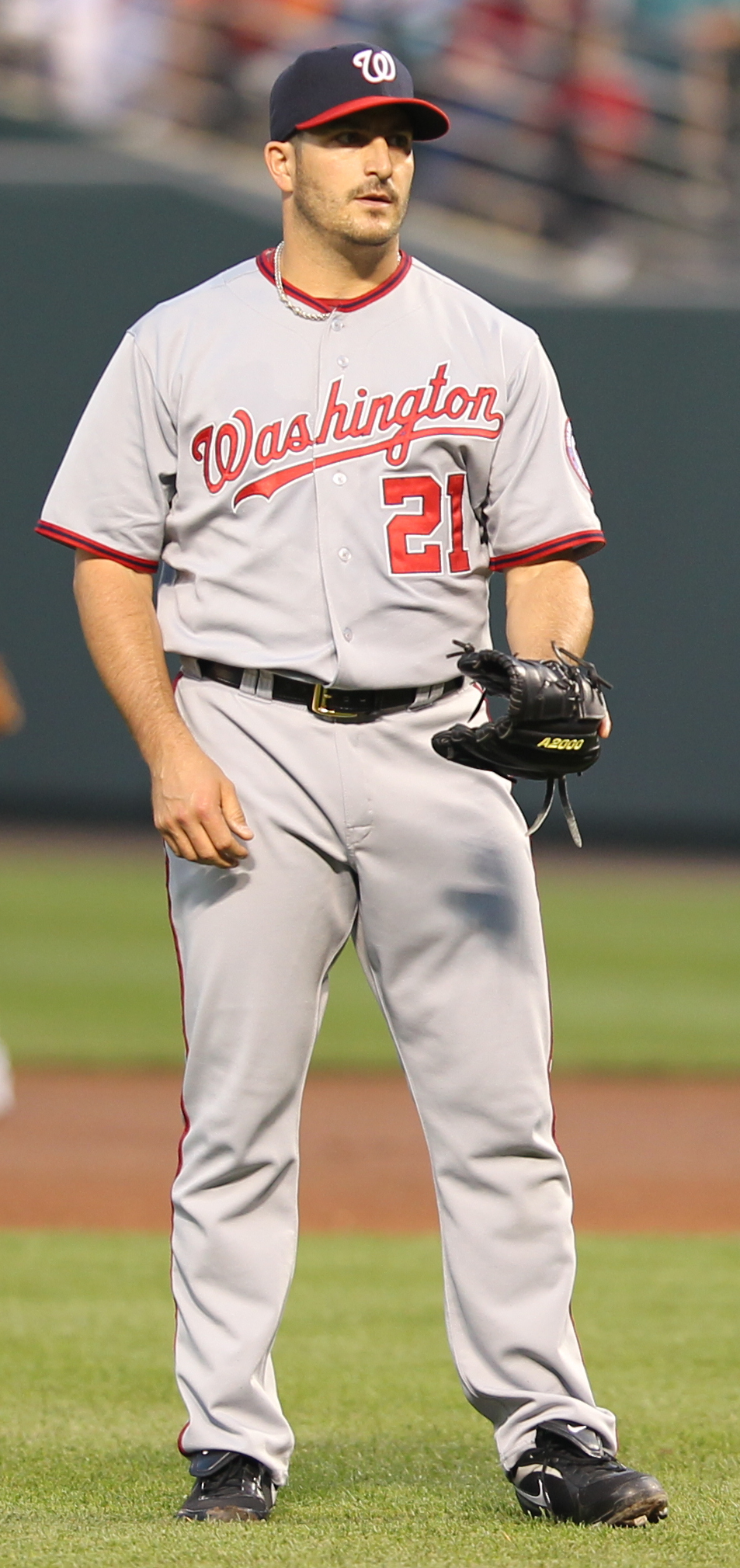
Jason Marquis

Mike Rizzo's new philosophy continued to show in the 2009–2010 offseason. He was able to acquire second baseman Adam Kennedy, All Star starting pitcher Jason Marquis (who began the 2010 season very poorly, though it was later revealed that he had bone chips in his throwing elbow, his ERA was over 13 at one point), and catcher Ivan "Pudge" Rodriguez. All three men had reputations as being great teammates. Collectively, they had extensive experience playing for successful teams. This was a contrast to the Nationals' roster at the time, which had some talented players who lacked experience playing for winning teams.

=== Seasons ===
==== 2005 ====
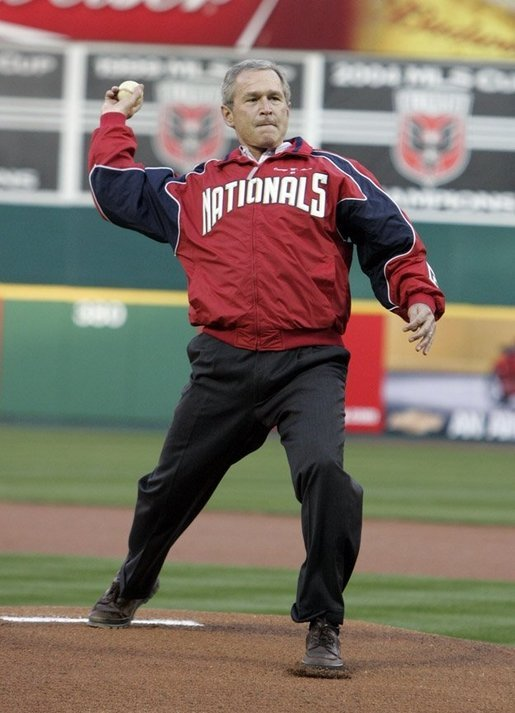
Then President George W. Bush throws out a ceremonial first pitch in 2005.

- On April 4, 2005, Brad Wilkerson (after being the last player to ever wear a Montreal Expo jersey) had the honor of being the first batter for the Washington Nationals and he promptly responded with the first hit for the new Washington incarnation of the team. Outfielder Terrmel Sledge hit the Nationals' first home run in the April 4 contest.
- On April 6, 2005, the Nationals recorded their first-ever regular season win by beating the Phillies, 7–3. The win came in their second game of the season and was highlighted by Wilkerson hitting for the cycle.
- On April 14, 2005, the Washington Nationals won their first regular season home game at RFK Stadium in Washington, D.C, by a score of 5–3 against the Arizona Diamondbacks. President George W. Bush kept up a tradition of sitting U.S. Presidents by throwing out the ceremonial first pitch on opening day in Washington, exactly 95 years after William Howard Taft started the tradition at Griffith Stadium. There were 45,596 fans in attendance, including former Senators players and Baseball Commissioner Bud Selig. Liván Hernández threw eight shutout innings, and Vinny Castilla was denied the chance to hit for the cycle when Diamondback reliever Lance Cormier hit him with a pitch in the bottom of the eighth; Castilla needed only a single to complete the cycle. Chad Cordero recorded the save for Washington.
- Between May 29 and June 15, 2005, the Nationals compiled a 15–2 record including a franchise record 10-game win streak (June 2–12). Ten of those games were decided by 1 run.
- On August 4, 2005, Brad Wilkerson became the first Washington Nationals player to ever hit a grand slam, against then Los Angeles Dodgers relief pitcher Duaner Sánchez. The Nationals won the game 7–0 on a four-hit complete game shutout by John Patterson.
- During his August–September callup, Ryan Zimmerman recorded 23 hits in 58 at-bats. He thus became the first member of the Washington Nationals to complete the season with a batting average of at least .300 in at least 50 at-bats.
- The Nationals led all National League teams in interleague play in 2005, recording 12 wins.
- At the halfway mark of the season, the Nationals were in first place in the National League East division, with a record of 50–31. However, they went 31–50 in the second half of the season, finishing at 81–81.

==== 2006 ====
- On May 19, 2006, the Nationals opened their first-ever regular season interleague series against the Baltimore Orioles. Although the Orioles won the first game of what would become known as the Beltway Series (which consisted of three games in Washington and three in Baltimore), the two teams split the season series, with the home team winning twice and the visitors once. These games marked the Orioles' first matchup with a Washington-based team in 35 years, as they played against the original Senators from 1954 to 1960, and against a new Senators team from 1961 to 1971. (Note: Prior to 2006, the Nationals' natural rival was the Toronto Blue Jays, dating back to their time in Montreal, and because the 2005 schedule was set with the Expos in mind, the two teams had to play another series that year.)
- On Father's Day, June 18, 2006, against the New York Yankees, the paid attendance was 45,157, the third-largest ever to see a single baseball game in the history of RFK Stadium. In that game, the Nationals beat the Yankees 3–2 on a two-run walk-off home run by rookie Ryan Zimmerman. (A 1962 doubleheader drew more spectators, as did the Nationals' first-ever home game with Arizona.)
- On September 2, 2006, the Nationals rallied from three runs down in the first game and from five runs down in the second game to take a day–night doubleheader sweep from the Arizona Diamondbacks, the first day-night doubleheader as part of the team's history in Washington.
- On Labor Day, September 4, 2006, Ramón Ortiz took a no-hitter into the ninth inning vs. the St. Louis Cardinals, but gave up a single to Aaron Miles on his second pitch in the 9th to break up the bid. Then he gave up a home run to Albert Pujols, ending his chance to get his second career shutout. Ortiz himself also hit a home run in the 8th inning. The Nationals won 5–2.
- On September 16, 2006, Alfonso Soriano became the fourth player to hit 40 home runs and steal 40 bases in a season when he stole his 40th base in the first inning of a game against the Milwaukee Brewers. Soriano followed that feat on September 22 by hitting his 40th double, becoming the first member of the "40–40 Club" to also hit 40 doubles in the same season.

==== 2007 ====
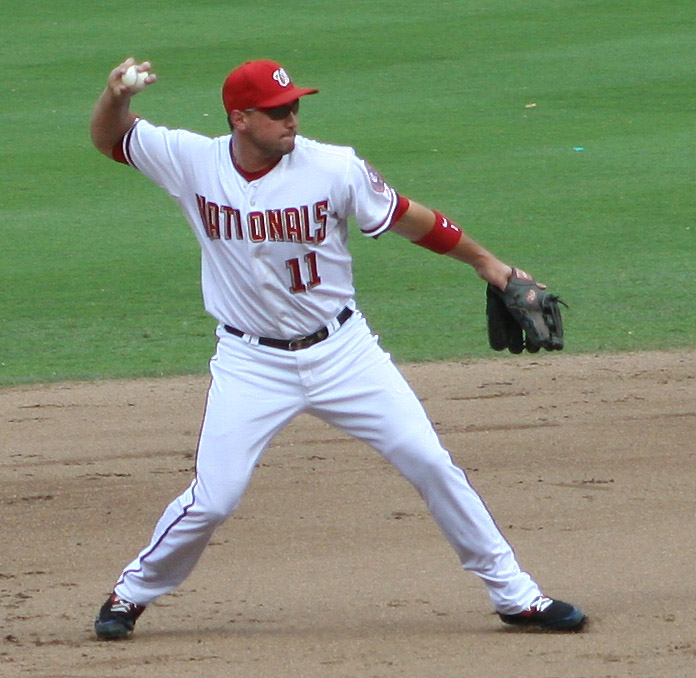
Ryan Zimmerman

After losing four starters (Liván Hernández, Tony Armas, Ramón Ortiz and Pedro Astacio) from the prior year, the Nationals invited an extraordinary 36 pitchers to spring training.

On Opening Day, the Nationals lost their starting shortstop Cristian Guzmán and center fielder Nook Logan for five weeks due to injuries. At the end of April, starting pitcher Jerome Williams hurt his ankle while batting and was placed on the 15-day disabled list. Then, in the space of just 10 days in May, Shawn Hill, John Patterson, and Jason Bergmann went on the disabled list. Jerome Williams returned, pitched one game, and went back on the DL with a shoulder injury. The Washington Post's wrote: "Almost everything that could sink a team's attitude has befallen the Nationals. They started the year 1–8, then they lost eight in a row to drop to 9–25."

They put journeymen Mike Bacsik, Micah Bowie, Tim Redding, and Jason Simontacchi, along with rookie reliever Levale Speigner into the starting rotation, amidst predictions that the 2007 Nationals might equal the 1962 Mets' record of futility of 120 losses in one season. But the Nationals bounced back, going 24–18 in their next 42 games through June 25. But on that day, a day in which Bergman made his first start off the DL, the Nationals received the news that shortstop Cristian Guzmán, their leadoff hitter (and second on the team with a .329 batting average) was lost for the rest of the season due to a thumb injury he had received the day before tagging out a runner.

The Nationals finished the 2007 season 73–89, improving their record by two more wins than in 2006.

- On April 17, 2007, one day after the shootings on the campus of Virginia Tech where 33 faculty and students were murdered in the largest mass shooting in US history, the Nationals wore Virginia Tech baseball hats as they hosted the Atlanta Braves. The idea was e-mailed to team President Stan Kasten by Nationals fan Dave Lanham following the shootings. One of these hats was sent to the National Baseball Hall of Fame to be displayed.
- On May 12, 2007, the Nationals hosted the Florida Marlins. Tied 3–3 in the bottom of the ninth, Marlins pitcher Jorge Julio faced Ryan Zimmerman with the bases loaded and two outs. Zimmerman hit the 2–2 pitch over the right-center field wall for a walk-off grand slam. Also during this game, right fielder Austin Kearns hit the Nationals' first inside-the-park home run. The game ended at 1:42AM after two separate extended rain delays.
- On August 7, 2007, while on the road against the San Francisco Giants, Nationals pitcher Mike Bacsik allowed Barry Bonds' 756th career home run, giving him first place on the career home run list. However, the Nationals won the game 8–6.
- On September 23, 2007, the Nationals played their final game at RFK Stadium, a 5–3 victory over the Philadelphia Phillies.

==== 2008 ====
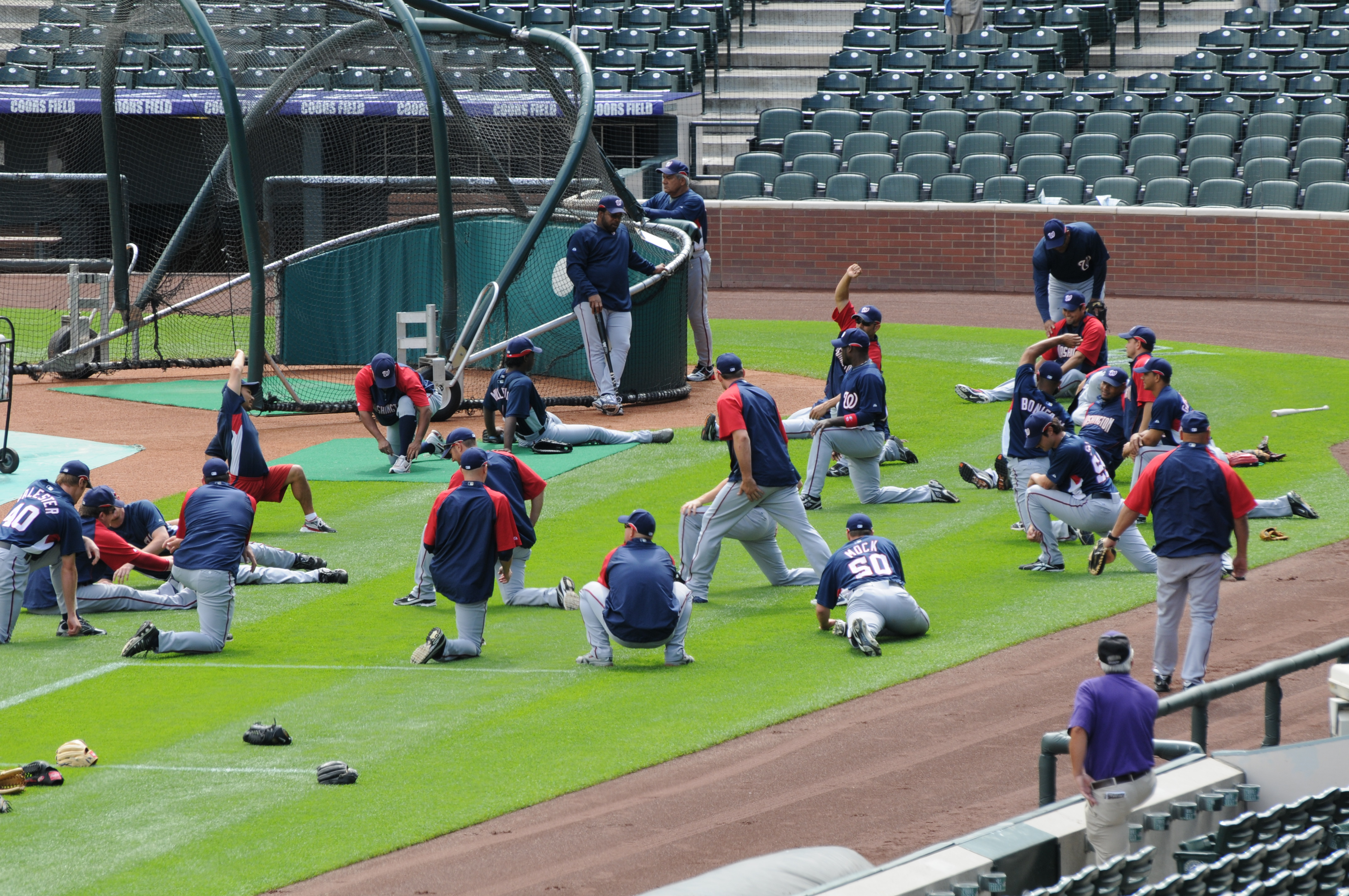
Nationals 2008 team during warm up

- On March 30, 2008, the Nationals held the grand opening of their new ballpark, Nationals Park, with a rare one game series against the Atlanta Braves. Continuing the tradition, President George W. Bush threw out the ceremonial first pitch to Nationals manager Manny Acta. The Nationals beat the Braves in dramatic fashion when, with two out in the bottom of the 9th inning, Ryan Zimmerman hit a solo walk-off home run off of pitcher Peter Moylan. This gave the Nationals a 3–2 victory. The first hit was recorded by Cristian Guzmán, the first RBI was recorded by Nick Johnson, the first run scored was recorded by Cristian Guzmán, the first home run was recorded by the Braves' Chipper Jones, and the first starting pitchers were Odalis Pérez for the Nationals and Tim Hudson for the Braves. President Bush was in the ESPN television booth at the time of Jones' homer and was the one who called it.

==== 2009 ====
- In April 2009, Ryan Zimmerman and Adam Dunn wore jerseys that improperly spelled the team's name as "Natinals". They later switched to properly spelled jerseys in the 3rd inning. Majestic Athletic, the uniform supplier for MLB later apologized. This spawned a rash of jokes both on the internet and on television regarding Nationals and futility. The jersey worn by Dunn was later auctioned for $8000 to benefit the Washington Nationals Dream foundation.
- On July 27, 2009, Josh Willingham hit two grand slams in a game against the Milwaukee Brewers. The first grand slam was hit against Jeff Suppan and the second against Mark DiFelice. Willingham became the 13th player in MLB history to accomplish the feat.
- On September 30, 2009, Justin Maxwell hit a two-out full count walk-off grand slam off Francisco Rodríguez of the 2009 New York Mets on Fan Appreciation Day, the Nationals' last home game of the season.
- On October 4, 2009, the Nationals' last game of the season, the Nationals won after 15 innings, the longest game for the team as part of its Washington history. The Nationals also became the first team in MLB history to start the season losing seven in a row and close the season winning seven in a row.

==== 2010 ====
- On April 5, 2010, President Barack Obama kept up a tradition of sitting U.S. Presidents by throwing out the ceremonial first pitch on opening day in Washington.

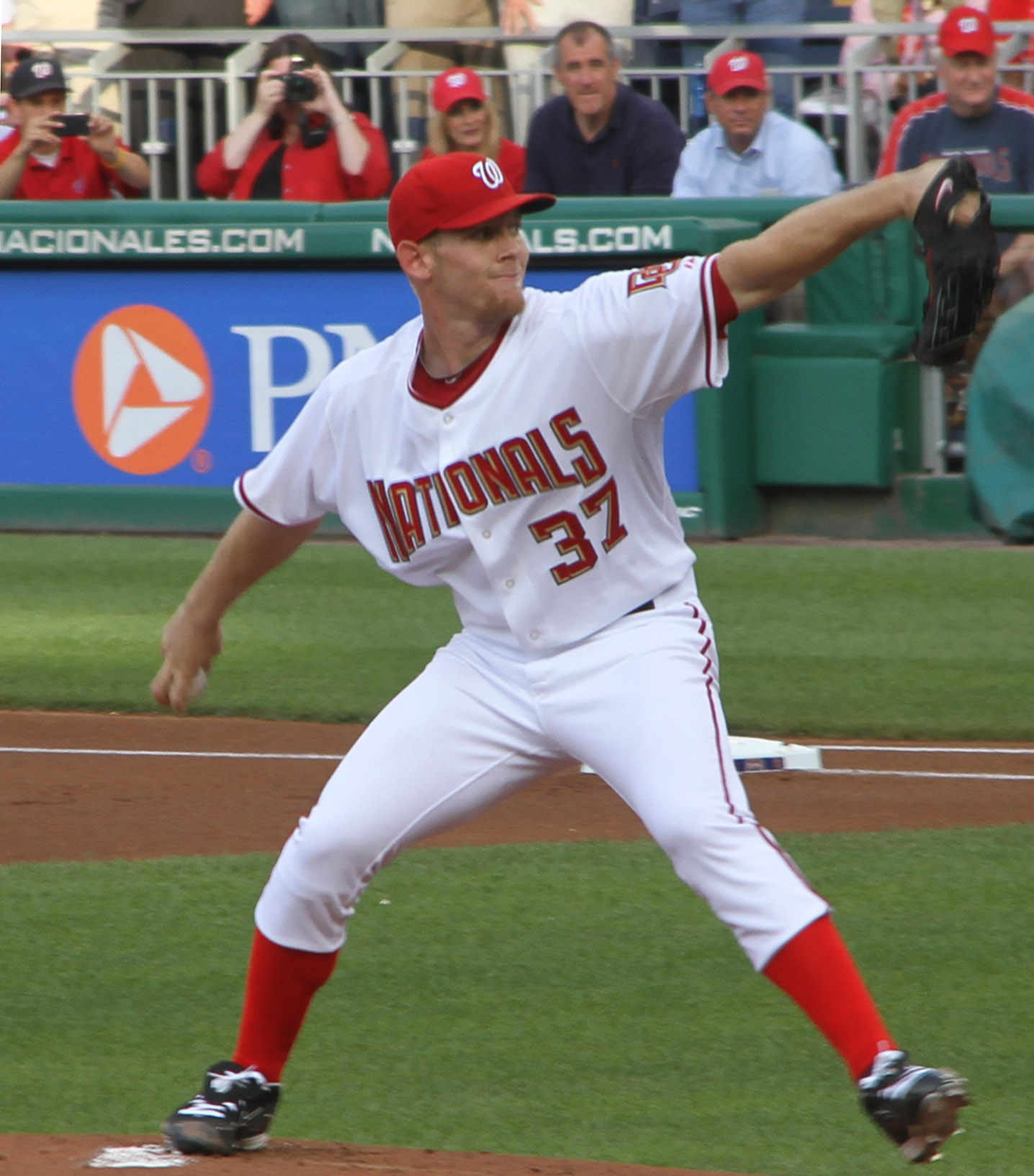
Stephen Strasburg during his major league debut

- On June 7, 2010, the Nationals selected Bryce Harper of Southern Nevada. Harper was expected to break the contract record set by Stephen Strasburg. Harper is also a client of Strasburg's agent Scott Boras. With 26 seconds left to sign, Harper and Boras agreed to a $9.9 million, five-year contract, falling short of Strasburg's 15.5 million over four years.
- On June 8, 2010, the first overall pick, Stephen Strasburg had his major league debut, attracting a sellout crowd of 40,315. Strasburg struck out 14 batters in seven innings, giving up just 2 earned runs in a win over the Pittsburgh Pirates. The 14 strikeouts were a record for the Nationals—the most in a single game by a National since the franchise moved to D.C.
- On July 29, 2010, the Nationals traded Matt Capps to the Minnesota Twins for Wilson Ramos. Ramos was considered to be the top catching prospect in the American League.
- On July 30, 2010, the Nationals traded infielder Cristian Guzmán to the Texas Rangers for two minor league pitchers. Guzmán had to approve the deal because he has 10-and-5 rights (players with 10 years in the major league and five consecutive years with their current team cannot be traded without their consent).
- On September 6, 2010, the Nationals won their 60th game of the season, eclipsing their win totals from the 2008 and 2009 season (finishing with 59 wins each time). September call-up Danny Espinosa hit two home runs including a grand slam in the Nationals' 13–3 win over the Mets at Nationals Park.
- On September 20, 2010, the Nationals recorded their lowest attendance ever since they came to Washington, with just 10,999 in attendance for a game against the Houston Astros. The poor attendance continued during the whole series, with fewer than 12,000 on September 21, fewer than 13,000 on September 22, and 14,633 on September 23.
- On September 23, 2010, team president Stan Kasten announced he would resign at the end of the season. Kasten did not explain in detail his reason for resigning and said, "It's just time to be doing something else."
- On November 10, 2010, the Nationals unveiled a new logo and uniforms.
- On December 5, 2010, the Nationals signed Jayson Werth to a seven-year deal worth $126 million.

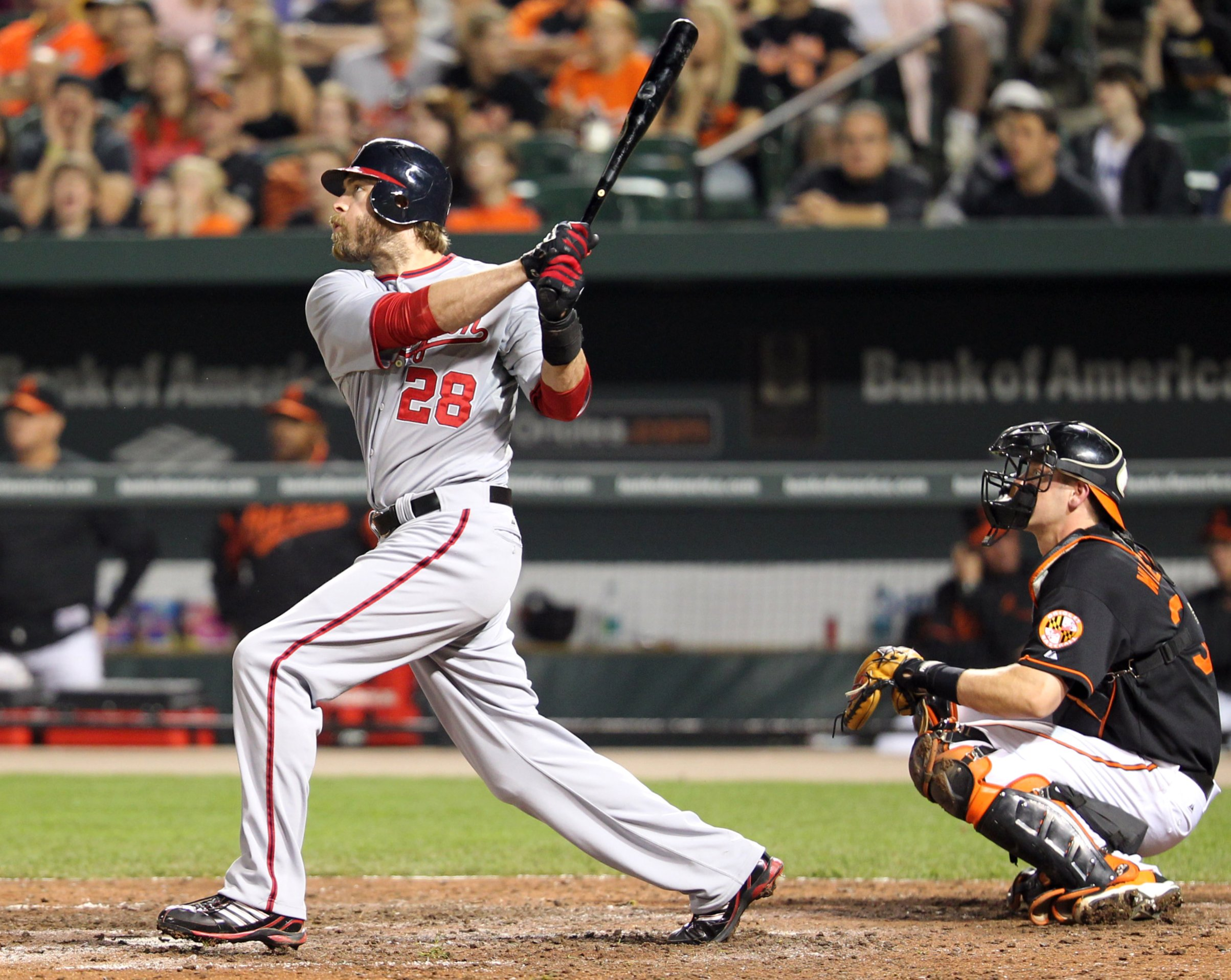
Jayson Werth playing for the Nationals against the Orioles in May 2011

==== 2011 ====
On June 23, 2011, the Nationals won a 1–0 game to put them above .500 with a record of 38–37 (.507), the latest point in the season the team had been above .500 since 2005. Immediately after the game, manager Jim Riggleman resigned, citing the team's refusal to discuss extending his contract. Bench coach John McLaren was named the interim manager. It was later reported that Davey Johnson was signed through the end of the 2011 season, with an option for 2012 (as a candidate in a search that would include minority candidates), and a contract as a front office consultant through 2013.

The Nationals finished the 2011 season in third place with a record of 80–81, their second-best record since they moved to Washington. They only played 161 games because a home game against the Dodgers was cancelled due to rain. The game was not made up because it was inconsequential to the playoffs with no room on the schedule to play it.

On December 23, Washington traded prospects A. J. Cole, Derek Norris, Tom Milone and Brad Peacock for All-Star Pitcher Gio González.

After the 2011 season, the last remaining member of the Expos – Liván Hernández – departed the Nationals, although his association with the team was non-continuous.

==== 2012 ====
On September 20, the Nationals beat the Los Angeles Dodgers to clinch a spot in the playoffs and became the first Washington-based baseball team to advance to the postseason in 79 years. On October 1, the Nationals clinched the National League East division and later clinched the best record in Major League Baseball at 98–64. However, the team lost to the St. Louis Cardinals in the NLDS 3 games to 2.

==== 2013 ====
In November 2012, manager Davey Johnson signed a contract to return for the 2013 season, and announced that he would retire from managing at the end of that season.

==== 2014 ====
On October 31, 2013, the Nationals announced the hiring of Matt Williams to replace Davey Johnson as the team's manager for the 2014 season. The Nationals clinched the NL East on September 16, 2014, after beating the Atlanta Braves. Jordan Zimmermann pitched the Nationals' first no-hitter (since moving from Montreal in 2005) on the last day of the 2014 regular season, September 28, 2014, against the Miami Marlins.

==== 2015 ====
The Nationals started their season in a skid, falling to the bottom of their division. On April 28, 2015, after a seven-game losing streak, with rookie starting pitcher A. J. Cole on the mound, the Nationals found themselves in at a nine-run deficit against their archrival, the Atlanta Braves. But the team clawed back to win the game 13–12, overcoming their largest run deficit ever. Over the coming weeks, the Nationals rebounded from their poor start to the season, rising to the top of the division behind a career-best season for outfielder Bryce Harper. On June 20, 2015, the Nationals shut out the Pittsburgh Pirates, with Max Scherzer throwing a no-hitter that was nearly perfect. The game was the second no-hitter in Nationals history. Scherzer became the first pitcher since Nolan Ryan in 1973 to throw two no-hitters in a single season regular season on October 3, 2015, shutting down the New York Mets in a performance that also equaled Ryan's historic mark of 17 strikeouts in a no-hitter. However, the Mets won the division, clinching it in late September.

==== 2016 ====
On May 11, 2016, Max Scherzer became the fourth pitcher in history to strike out 20 batters over nine innings in a single game, joining Roger Clemens (twice), Randy Johnson, and Kerry Wood. He led the National League in wins, strikeouts, and innings pitched and won the NL Cy Young Award, becoming the sixth pitcher in history to win the award in both leagues. The Nationals won the East division with a 95–67 record but lost in the NLDS to the Dodgers.

==== 2017 ====
In 2017, the Nationals again won the East division but lost in the NLDS to the Cubs, marking the fourth time out of four playoff appearances since 2012 in which the team was eliminated in the NLDS. Max Scherzer won the NL Cy Young Award for the second year in a row.

==== 2018 ====
2018 saw the Nationals host the MLB All-Star Game, but the team would regress and miss out on the playoffs, barely cracking .500 with an 82–80 record. Bryce Harper left the team after the season, signing with the Philadelphia Phillies as a free agent.

==== 2019 ====
Even without Harper, the Nationals would excel in 2019, earning a Wild Card berth with a 93–69 record, defeating the Milwaukee Brewers in the Wild Card play-in game, and winning their first playoff series since their arrival in Washington, D.C., upsetting the Los Angeles Dodgers in 5 games in their NLDS. They went on to sweep the St. Louis Cardinals in the NLCS to win the National League pennant, their first in team history dating back to their days in Montreal. When they faced the Houston Astros in the World Series, it was also the first appearance for a Washington-based team since the first AL Senators lost to the New York Giants in 1933. The Nationals went on to win their first World Series title 4 games to 3, becoming the second Washington, D.C.–based professional sports team to win their first championship in the same year, following the WNBA's Washington Mystics a few weeks earlier, and also became the third men's professional sports team to win their first title, following the NHL's St. Louis Blues and the NBA's Toronto Raptors.

==== 2020 ====
Following the 2019 season, Anthony Rendon departed to the Los Angeles Angels in free agency. The team signed Stephen Strasburg to a seven-year, $245 million contract extension. The 2020 season was shortened to 60 games, and the Nationals finished with a disappointing 26–34 record.

==== 2021 ====
The Nationals got off to another disappointing start in 2021 and were under .500 at the trade deadline. GM Mike Rizzo opted to trade many of the franchise's cornerstone players in exchange for prospects, most notably trading ace pitcher Max Scherzer and homegrown star Trea Turner to the Dodgers. The moves signified the end of an era for the team. The Nationals finished last in the National League East with a 65–97 record.

==== 2022 ====
The 2022 season was the Nationals franchise's worst since 1976, as they finished last in the National League East with a 55–107 record. On August 2, 2022, first baseman Josh Bell and outfielder Juan Soto were traded to the San Diego Padres.

==== 2023 ====
In 2023, the Nationals finished last in the National League East for the fourth year in a row, posting a 71–91 record.

==== 2024 ====
In 2024, the Nationals finished fourth in the National League East, posting a 71–91 record for the second year in a row.

== See also ==
- Washington Nationals nicknames
