= Macrococcus brunensis =

Scientific classification
- Domain: Bacteria
- Kingdom: Bacillati
- Phylum: Bacillota
- Class: Bacilli
- Order: Caryophanales
- Family: Staphylococcaceae
- Genus: Macrococcus
- Species: M. brunensis

Binomial name
- Macrococcus brunensis Mannerová et al.

Species of bacterium

Macrococcus brunensis is a species of gram-positive bacteria belonging to the genus Macrococcus.

== History ==
This species was described in 2003.

== Description ==
The cells are coccoid, Gram-positive, catalase-positive, and oxidase-positive, with a diameter of 0.89–1.21 micrometres.

== Epidemiology ==
This species was isolated from the skin of llamas (Lama glama).

== Clinical ==
This species has not been associated with disease.
