= Jeotgalicoccus =

Scientific classification
- Domain: Bacteria
- Kingdom: Bacillati
- Phylum: Bacillota
- Class: Bacilli
- Order: Bacillales
- Family: Staphylococcaceae
- Genus: Jeotgalicoccus; Yoon et al. 2003

Type species
- Jeotgalicoccus halotolerans Yoon et al. 2003

Species
- See text

Genus of bacteria

Jeotgalicoccus is a genus of Gram-positive, facultatively anaerobic, and halotolerant to halophilic bacteria. The cells are coccoid. The genus is named after the Korean fish sauce jeotgal, whence these bacteria were first isolated.

== Phylogeny ==
The currently accepted taxonomy is based on the List of Prokaryotic names with Standing in Nomenclature (LPSN) and National Center for Biotechnology Information (NCBI).

16S rRNA based LTP_10_2024

- Jeotgalicoccus
  - - J. pinnipedialis Hoyles et al. 2004
    - J. schoeneichii Glaeser et al. 2016
  - - - J. marinus Chen et al. 2009
      - J. huakuii Guo et al. 2010
    - - J. meleagridis Kämpfer et al. 2021
      - - - J. aerolatus Martin et al. 2011
          - J. halophilus Liu et al. 2011
        - - - J. halotolerans Yoon et al. 2003
            - J. nanhaiensis Liu et al. 2011
          - - J. coquinae Martin et al. 2011
            - J. psychrophilus Yoon et al. 2003

120 marker proteins based GTDB 09-RS220

- - - - Phocicoccus
        - P. pinnipedialis (Hoyles et al. 2004) Bello et al. 2024
        - P. schoeneichii (Glaeser et al. 2016) Bello et al. 2024
    - Nosocomiicoccus
  - - Jeotgalicoccus
      - - J. marinus [J. huakuii]
        - J. meleagridis ["Ca. J. stercoravium" Gilroy et al. 2021]
      - - J. aerolatus [J. halophilus]
        - - - J. halotolerans
            - J. nanhaiensis
          - - J. psychrophilus
            - - J. coquinae
              - "J. saudimassiliensis" Papadioti et al. 2017
