= Hoyles =

Hoyles is a surname. Notable people with the surname include:

- Celia Hoyles (born 1946), British mathematician
- Hugh Hoyles (1814–1888), Newfoundland politician
- Lesley Hoyles, Welsh microbiologist
- Newman Wright Hoyles (1777–1840), English-born businessman and politician in Newfoundland

== Fictional ==
- Jayden Hoyles, from Daybreak (2019 TV series)

== See also ==
- Hoyle
