= Jeotgalicoccus marinus =

Scientific classification
- Domain: Bacteria
- Kingdom: Bacillati
- Phylum: Bacillota
- Class: Bacilli
- Order: Caryophanales
- Family: Staphylococcaceae
- Genus: Jeotgalicoccus
- Species: J. marinus

Binomial name
- Jeotgalicoccus marinus Chen et al. 2009

Species of bacterium

Jeotgalicoccus marinus is a species of Gram-positive, facultatively anaerobic bacteria. It is moderately halophilic, it grows in environments with 0.5–25.0 % total salts. The cells are coccoid. The species was isolated from a sea urchin (Hemicentrotus pulcherrimus) from the South China Sea.
