= Salinicoccus kunmingensis =

Scientific classification
- Domain: Bacteria
- Kingdom: Bacillati
- Phylum: Bacillota
- Class: Bacilli
- Order: Caryophanales
- Family: Staphylococcaceae
- Genus: Salinicoccus
- Species: S. kunmingensis

Binomial name
- Salinicoccus kunmingensis Chen et al., 2007

Species of bacterium

Salinicoccus kunmingensis is a standard gram-positive bacteria in the genus Salinicoccus and Staphylococcaceae family. It is moderately halophilic growing in 0.5-25% NaCl solution, with an optimum at 8-10% NaCl solution.

== Genome ==
Salinincoccus kunmingensis is partially sequenced and is available at GenBank (accession DQ837380) for YIM Y15 Strain. Has an estimated 1493 base pairs with Guanine and Cytosine content only 46.2%.

== Strain YIM Y15 ==
Salinicoccus kunmingensis strain YIM Y15 was first isolated from a salt mine in Yunnan China. It is approximately 0.8–1.2 mm in diameter, with circular shapes in appearance and yellow pigmented in color.

It is strictly aerobic, with predominant respiratory quinone MK-6 and minimal amounts of MK-7(1.2%). Only moderately halophilic with a growth rate of 0.5%-25% (w/v) NaCl but only occurring with temperature within 4-45°C. Major cellular fatty acids are anteios-C_{15:0}(28.4%) and iso-C_{15:0}(23.1). These differences together results in the ability of hydrolyse aesculin, Tween80, and acid production from D-fructose, D-mannitol and sucrose.
