= Macrococcus lamae =

Scientific classification
- Domain: Bacteria
- Kingdom: Bacillati
- Phylum: Bacillota
- Class: Bacilli
- Order: Caryophanales
- Family: Staphylococcaceae
- Genus: Macrococcus
- Species: M. lamae

Binomial name
- Macrococcus lamae Mannerová et al. 2003

Species of bacterium

Macrococcus lamae is a species of gram-positive bacteria belonging to the genus Macrococcus. Strains of this species were originally isolated from the skin of llamas.
