= RsaOG =

rsaOG RNA
- The consensus secondary structure of RsaOG showing its pseudoknot, created in Varna. Boundaries were determined by RACE mapping in Staphylococcus aureus N315.

Identifiers
- Symbol: RsaOG
- Rfam: RF01775

Other data
- RNA type: sRNA
- Domain: Staphylococcus
- PDB structures: PDBe

RsaOG (an acronym for RNA S. aureus Orsay G) is a non-coding RNA that was discovered in the pathogenic bacteria Staphylococcus aureus N315 using a large-scale computational screening based on phylogenetic profiling. It was first identified, but not named, in 2005. RsaOG has since been identified in other strains of Staphylococcus aureus under the name of RsaI, it has also been discovered in other members of the Staphylococcus genus (such as Staphylococcus carnosus) but in no other bacteria.

The RsaOG gene is conserved in all Staphylococcaceae sequenced genomes, its secondary structure contains two highly conserved unpaired sequences which have the ability to form a pseudoknot. Northern blot experiments show that RsaOG is expressed in several S. aureus strains. Mapping of RsaOG ends indicates a size of 146 nucleotides in S. aureus. RsaOG ncRNA is thought to have trans-acting regulatory functions, possibly on fine-tuning toxin production or aiding with invasion.

== See also ==
- Rsa RNA
- Pathogenicity island
- Bacterial small RNA
