= Aquibacillus halophilus =

Scientific classification
- Domain: Bacteria
- Kingdom: Bacillati
- Phylum: Bacillota
- Class: Bacilli
- Order: Bacillales
- Family: Bacillaceae
- Genus: Aquibacillus
- Species: A. halophilus

Binomial name
- Aquibacillus halophilus Amoozegar et al. 2014

Type strain
- B6B, IBRC-M 10775, KCTC 13828

Species of bacterium

Aquibacillus halophilus is a Gram-positive and moderately halophilic bacterium from the genus of Aquibacillus.
