= Aquibacillus =

Scientific classification
- Domain: Bacteria
- Kingdom: Bacillati
- Phylum: Bacillota
- Class: Bacilli
- Order: Bacillales
- Family: Bacillaceae
- Genus: Aquibacillus; Amoozegar et al. 2014

Type species
- Aquibacillus albus (Zhang et al. 2013) Amoozegar et al. 2014

Species
- A. albus; A. halophilus; A. kalidii; A. koreensis; A. rhizosphaerae; A. salifodinae; A. saliphilus; "A. salsiterrae"; A. sediminis

Genus of bacteria

Aquibacillus is a genus of bacteria from the family of Bacillaceae.

== Phylogeny ==
The currently accepted taxonomy is based on the List of Prokaryotic names with Standing in Nomenclature (LPSN) and National Center for Biotechnology Information (NCBI).

16S rRNA based LTP_10_2024

- Aquibacillus~
  - Aquibacillus kalidii Wang, Xu & Sun 2021
  - "Aquibacillus salsiterrae" Galisteo et al. 2023

- - - Aquibacillus albus (Zhang et al. 2013) Amoozegar et al. 2014
    - - Radiobacillus
      - - Aquibacillus~
          - Aquibacillus salifodinae Zhang et al. 2015
          - - Aquibacillus koreensis (Lee et al. 2006) Amoozegar et al. 2014
            - - Aquibacillus halophilus Amoozegar et al. 2014
              - Aquibacillus saliphilus Cho & Whang 2022
  - - - Aquibacillus rhizosphaerae Ding et al. 2024
      - - Aquibacillus sediminis Lee & Whang 2019
        - Terrihalobacillus
    - other

120 marker proteins based GTDB 09-RS220

- - Aquibacillus sediminis
  - - - Aquibacillus
        - - A. albus
          - "A. salsiterrae"
        - - - A. kalidii
            - A. koreensis
          - - A. halophilus
            - A. saliphilus
    - other

== See also ==
- List of Bacteria genera
- List of bacterial orders
