= John Knox Christian School (Oakville) =

Christian school in Oakville, Ontario, Canada

Location
- 2232 Sheridan Garden Drive; Oakville, Ontario, L6J 7T1; Canada; 43.48961°N 79.65673°W

Information
- Motto: Instruct, study, experience, and observe in Christ
- Established: 1959
- Principal: George Petrusma
- Grades: JK-8
- Enrollment: approx. 350+
- Colours: burgundy, white
- Affiliations: Ontario Alliance of Christian Schools,
- Website: www.jkcs-oakville.org

John Knox Christian School (JKCS) is an independent Christian school located in Oakville, Ontario, Canada. It was founded in 1953 and began classes in 1959. John Knox currently has an enrollment of about 350+ students. JKCS is a member of the Ontario Alliance of Christian Schools (OACS).

== History ==
In 1953, several Christian families from the Clarkson Christian Reformed Church came together to form a Christian elementary school.

John Knox Christian School opened for operation in September 1959, with Mr. Van Dijk as principal. Two classrooms were set up in the basement of the Clarkson Christian Reformed Church with 44 students in eight grades. In 1961, a three-classroom building at 1884 Lakeshore Road West in Clarkson was opened. An additional two-classroom addition was ready by September 1963.

In 1981 another classroom, a staff room and a gymnasium were opened. In 1983, a senior kindergarten program was implemented in the basement of the Clarkson Christian Reformed Church. Junior kindergarten followed in 1984. Further expansion in 1988 necessitated the placement of two portable classrooms on the playground. In 1992, a Building Planning Committee began to search for a location to accommodate continuing growth. In 1994 a new property was purchased and in 1995 construction began. The school doors opened at 2232 Sheridan Garden Drive, Oakville in September 1995 with 259 students and 16 staff. The student body continued to grow in numbers so that during the summer of 1996 the portables from the old school in Mississauga were transported to the new location and refurbished to accommodate an enrollment of 305 and 18 staff members in September 1996. In the summer of 1999, the new facility was expanded to include an additional computer lab, an art room, a music room and additional classrooms. The portable classrooms were also removed at this time. The school has a capacity for 395 students from junior kindergarten to grade 8.

== Athletics ==
JKCS's school colors are burgundy and white and has a variety of sports teams, for both junior (grades 5&6) and senior (grades 7&8) grades, such as girls and boys soccer, volleyball, basketball, hockey, and badminton. There are also track and field team and a cross country team. These teams compete against others in the OACS, PSAA, and elsewhere.

== Academics ==
JKCS subjects include math, language arts (spelling, grammar, creative writing, and literature), geography, history, science, health, French, art, physical education, Bible, and computers. The computer classes follow the TechnoKids curriculum. Additionally, students in grades 6 and up must choose to participate in either Band or Drama.

== Co-curricular ==
Students from Grades 1 to 5 are required to be a part of the choir. There are two choirs: the Primary Choir is grades 1&2 and the Junior Choir is Grades 3-5. Students in grades 4&5 also learn recorder.

All students in Grades 6-8 art a part of either the Band or Drama class. Grade 6s take part in Junior band/drama, where they are required to do both band and drama, each for half the year, so that they can choose which they would like to be a part of the next year. The senior band and drama is grades 7&8. The Senior students have classes with just their grade and classes with the entire group. The Band performs at most school concert, and the drama does a big performance at the end of year concert and also perform for occasions such as Christmas and Easter. The Grade 7&8 students all go on an overnight Band and Drama tour each year which usually alternates between Québec City, Québec and Ottawa, Ontario.

JKCS also participates in the Battle of the Books each year with two teams; the junior team, which is grades 4-6, and the senior team, which is grades 7&8.

The servant team was formed by a teacher a few years ago. Each month the Servant Team serve different people in the surrounding community. They have served at bazaars and membership meetings, sang in the school's neighbourhood, served breakfast at Kerr Street Ministries, socialized at a senior's home, served at an organization called "Sew on Fire," and raked leaves for families with cancer.

Every other year, JKCS has a science fair where all students are required to complete a project. Teachers then select students from grades 7&8 to participate in the Redeemer Science Fair. In the Science Fair of April 2011, students from this school won 1st overall, 3rd overall, 1st in the Physical Science category, and 1st Honourable Mention for an innovation.

JKCS is also part of a new program called CEIADA, which is the abbreviation for Christian Education in a Digital Age.

== Uniforms ==
The uniform policy is as follows:

Girls from Jr. Kindergarten to Grade 4 wear a plaid jumper or navy pants, a white blouse with collar, white turtleneck, or white polo shirt, and an optional burgundy hoodie. Girls in grades 5-8 wear navy blue pants or a plaid kilt with burgundy knee socks/ tights. They can also wear an optional burgundy hoodie with the school logo. Boys wear navy blue pants with a white shirt and an optional burgundy hoodie with the school logo. All students can also choose to wear navy blue shorts instead of pants during the warmer months while girls from Jr. Kindergarten to Grade 4 also have the option of wearing navy blue skorts. All students in grades 2-8 must wear a gym uniform during Physical Education class, which is a grey T-shirt with the school logo and black gym shorts with the school logo. The uniform supplier for the school is InSchoolwear.

== Notable alumni ==
- Joel Reinders, played pro football in the CFL
- Nathan Rourke, played pro football in the CFL
