= Abyssicoccus albus =

Scientific classification
- Domain: Bacteria
- Kingdom: Bacillati
- Phylum: Bacillota
- Class: Bacilli
- Order: Bacillales
- Family: Staphylococcaceae
- Genus: Abyssicoccus
- Species: A. albus

Binomial name
- Abyssicoccus albus Jiang et al. 2016

Type strain
- CCTCC AB 2014213, DSM 29158, YIM M12140

Synonyms
- Albicoccus indicus

Species of bacterium

Abyssicoccus albus is a Gram-positive, aerobic and non-motile bacterium from the genus of Abyssicoccus which has been isolated from deep sea sediments from the Indian Ocean.
