= Jeotgalicoccus halotolerans =

Scientific classification
- Domain: Bacteria
- Kingdom: Bacillati
- Phylum: Bacillota
- Class: Bacilli
- Order: Bacillales
- Family: Staphylococcaceae
- Genus: Jeotgalicoccus
- Species: J. halotolerans

Binomial name
- Jeotgalicoccus halotolerans Yoon et al. 2003

Species of bacterium

Jeotgalicoccus halotolerans is a gram-positive bacterium. It is moderate halophilic, it growth in the presence of 0–20% NaCl. The cells are coccoid, with a diameter of 0.6–1.1 μm.
