= Aquibacillus salifodinae =

Scientific classification
- Domain: Bacteria
- Kingdom: Bacillati
- Phylum: Bacillota
- Class: Bacilli
- Order: Bacillales
- Family: Bacillaceae
- Genus: Aquibacillus
- Species: A. salifodinae

Binomial name
- Aquibacillus salifodinae Zhang et al. 2015

Type strain
- CGMCC 1.12849, JCM 19761, WSY08-1

Synonyms
- Virgibacillus salifodinae

Genus of bacteria

Aquibacillus halophilus is a Gram-positive, rod-shaped and strictly aerobic bacterium from the genus of Aquibacillus.
