= Macrococcus caseolyticus =

Scientific classification
- Domain: Bacteria
- Kingdom: Bacillati
- Phylum: Bacillota
- Class: Bacilli
- Order: Bacillales
- Family: Staphylococcaceae
- Genus: Macrococcus
- Species: M. caseolyticus

Binomial name
- Macrococcus caseolyticus Kloos et al., 1998

Species of bacterium

Macrococcus caseolyticus is a nonmotile, gram-positive cocci bacteria of the genus Macrococcus. They typically occur singly in pairs or short chains and clusters.

M. caseolyticus are the most studied species in the genus Macrococcus. They have been used in the process of creating fermented foods, helping to develop flavor and aroma. They are commonly used as starter cultures in fermentation.

They are nonpathogenic or opportunistic pathogens. Studies have shown that M. caseolyticus has genes associated with resistance to methicillin and other antibiotics in M. caseolytics and these resistance genes could be transferred into other bacteria in food, typically staphylococcal species.

M. caseolyticus is phylogenetically related to Staphylococcus. It has a small chromosome of 2.1 MB and 8 plasmids.
