= Jeotgalicoccus psychrophilus =

Scientific classification
- Domain: Bacteria
- Kingdom: Bacillati
- Phylum: Bacillota
- Class: Bacilli
- Order: Bacillales
- Family: Staphylococcaceae
- Genus: Jeotgalicoccus
- Species: J. psychrophilus

Binomial name
- Jeotgalicoccus psychrophilus Yoon et al. 2003

Species of bacterium

Jeotgalicoccus psychrophilus is a gram-positive bacterium. It is psychrophilic, it growth between 4 and 34 °C. To this also refers the selected species name. The cells are coccoid.
