= Joel Reinders =

Canadian gridiron football player (born 1987)

No. 68, 65, 61
- Position: Offensive lineman

Personal information
- Born: October 2, 1987 (age 39); Oakville, Ontario, Canada
- Listed height: 6 ft 8 in (2.03 m)

Career information
- University: University of Waterloo
- CFL draft: 2010: 4th round, 26th overall pick

Career history
- 2010: Cleveland Browns
- 2012: New York Giants
- 2012–2013: Toronto Argonauts
- 2013–2014: Hamilton Tiger-Cats

Awards and highlights
- Grey Cup champion (2012)

Joel Reinders (born October 2, 1987) is a Canadian former professional football offensive tackle. He played university football at the University of Waterloo.

== University athletics ==
Reinders spent four years at the University of Waterloo where he played on the school basketball team for two years before coming across the doorstep of Dennis McPhee, head coach of the University of Waterloo Football team. Reinders saw some UW players and they suggested he come try out for the team. Unsatisfied with the game of basketball, he moved on to become an aspiring football player. Over his last two seasons of university, he was able to develop his football skills to the point that both the CFL and NFL took notice.

== CFL draft ==
Two days after his announced signing in Cleveland, Reinders was drafted by the Toronto Argonauts 26th overall in the 2010 CFL draft on May 2, 2010. After a strong showing at the CFL Evaluation Camp, Reinders was ranked as the 11th best overall Canadian prospect by the CFL E-Camp Scouting Bureau. Due to his NFL signing, his draft stock had lowered considerably and was selected in the fourth round. After being cut from the New York Giants on August 27, 2012, Reinders signed a deal with the Toronto Argonauts On August 28, 2012.

== Professional career ==
On April 30, 2010, Reinders was signed as an undrafted free agent by the Cleveland Browns after only watching a single YouTube video showing highlights of the eight football games that he played in. According to their website, the Cleveland Browns waived Reinders from their practice squad on September 4, 2010. On March 13, 2012 Reinders was signed by the New York Giants. He was cut by the New York Giants on August 27, 2012.

On August 28, 2012, Reinders was signed by the Toronto Argonauts of the Canadian Football League.

On September 17, 2013, Reinders was released by the Toronto Argonauts.

On September 20, 2013 Reinders was signed as a free agent by the Hamilton Tiger-Cats of the Canadian Football League.

On May 12, 2015 Reinders retired from professional football.

== Personal life ==
Reinders is the nephew of former NHL player Wayne Van Dorp. Joel grew up in Oakville, Ontario, where he attended John Knox Christian School and later King's Christian Collegiate for high school, graduating in 2005, without ever playing high school football.
