= Abyssicoccus =

Scientific classification
- Domain: Bacteria
- Kingdom: Bacillati
- Phylum: Bacillota
- Class: Bacilli
- Order: Bacillales
- Family: Staphylococcaceae
- Genus: Abyssicoccus; Jiang et al. 2016

Type species
- Abyssicoccus albus Tsubouchi et al. 2013

Species
- Abyssicoccus albus

Genus of bacteria

Abyssicoccus is a genus from the family Staphylococcaceae, with one known species (Abyssicoccus albus).
