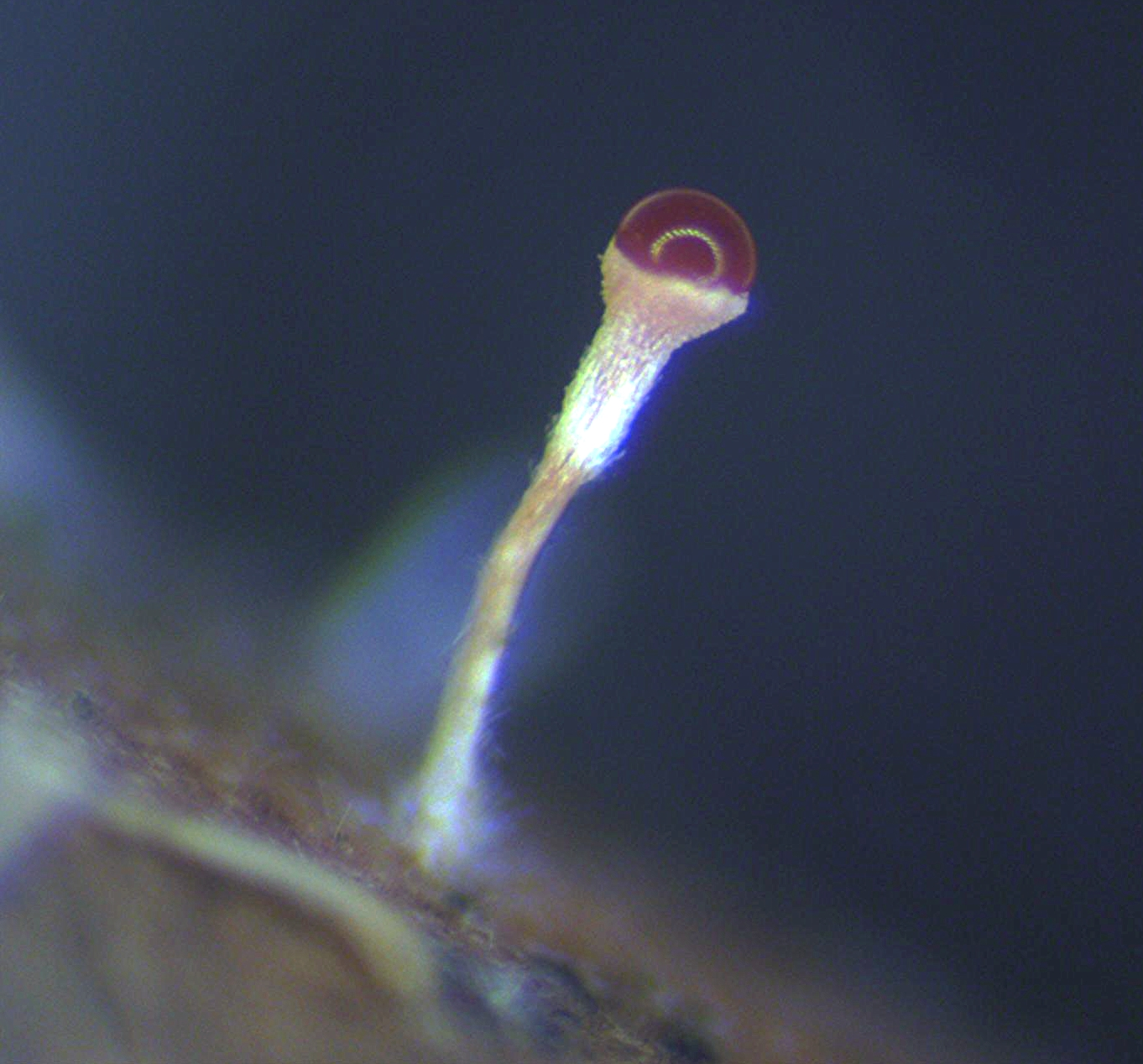
- Acrostalagmus annulatus found on decaying palm frond in a greenhouse

Scientific classification
- Kingdom: Fungi
- Division: Ascomycota
- Class: Sordariomycetes
- Order: Hypocreales
- Family: Hypocreaceae
- Genus: Acrostalagmus; Corda, 1838

Extant species
- Acrostalagmus albus; Acrostalagmus luteoalbus

= Acrostalagmus =

Genus of fungi

Acrostalagmus is a genus of fungi belonging to the family Plectosphaerellaceae.

The genus was described in 1838 by August Carl Joseph Corda. The commonest species is a hyphomycete, Acrostalagmus luteoalbus, which makes verticillate conidiophores with orange balls of slimy 1-celled conidia. It grows on dung and other kinds of debris. The species was often classified in Verticillium until DNA phylogenies suggested that the root-pathogenic species of that genus are distinct. The synnematous species Acrostalagmus annulatus is also relatively common.

Species:

- Acrostalagmus albus
- Acrostalagmus annulatus
- Acrostalagmus luteoalbus
