= Amphorocalyx =

Scientific classification
- Kingdom: Plantae
- Clade: Tracheophytes
- Clade: Angiosperms
- Clade: Eudicots
- Clade: Rosids
- Order: Myrtales
- Family: Melastomataceae
- Genus: Amphorocalyx; Baker

Genus of flowering plants

Amphorocalyx is a genus of flowering plants belonging to the family Melastomataceae.

Its native range is Madagascar.

Species:

- Amphorocalyx albus Jum. & H.Perrier
- Amphorocalyx auratifolius H.Perrier
- Amphorocalyx latifolius H.Perrier
- Amphorocalyx multiflorus Baker
- Amphorocalyx rupestris H.Perrier
