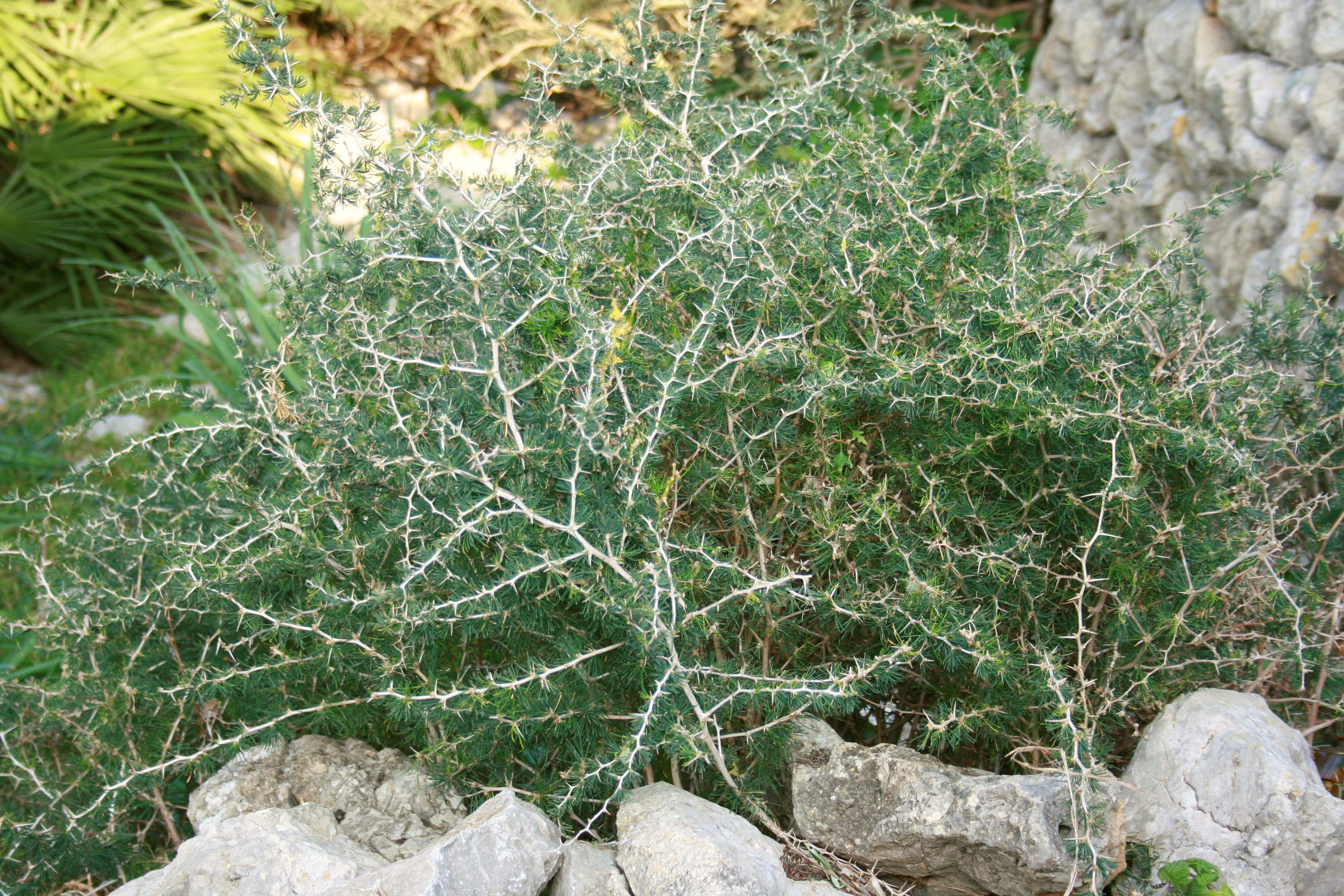
- Stems are white
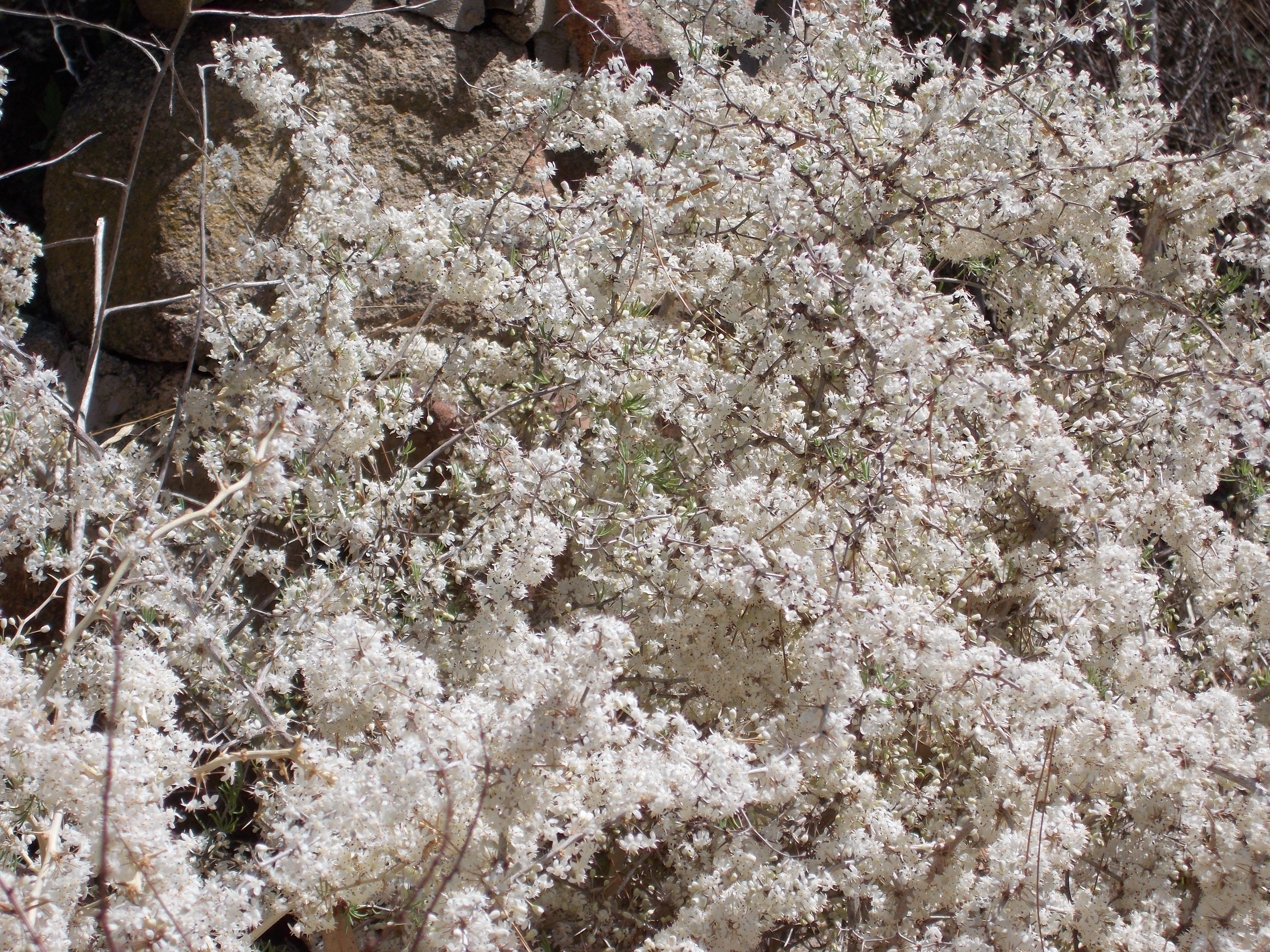
- Flowers are white

Conservation status
- Least Concern (IUCN 3.1)

Scientific classification
- Kingdom: Plantae
- Clade: Tracheophytes
- Clade: Angiosperms
- Clade: Monocots
- Order: Asparagales
- Family: Asparagaceae
- Subfamily: Asparagoideae
- Genus: Asparagus
- Species: A. albus

Binomial name
- Asparagus albus L.

Synonyms
- Asparagopsis alba (L.) Kunth; Asparagus pallidus Salisb.

= Asparagus albus =

Species of plant

Asparagus albus is a widespread species of flowering plant in the family Asparagaceae, native to the western and central Mediterranean. It is found in the coastal maquis shrubland biome, and in ruderal situations.

== Taxonomy ==
Asparagus albus was formally described in 1753 by the Swedish naturalist Carl Linnaeus in the first volume of his Species Plantarum under its current binomial name. The specific epithet, albus, is Latin meaning "white".
