= Christopher Johnson (Canadian football) =

Canadian football player (born 1991)

Toronto Varsity Blues
- Title: Linebackers coach

Personal information
- Born: April 18, 1991 (age 35); Toronto, Ontario, Canada
- Listed height: 5 ft 11 in (1.80 m)
- Listed weight: 220 lb (100 kg)

Career information
- Position: Linebacker (No. 37)
- High school: Pickering
- University: Toronto
- CFL draft: 2014: 5th round, 44th overall pick

Career history

Playing
- 2014–2015: Hamilton Tiger-Cats
- 2015: Calgary Stampeders*
- 2017: Montreal Alouettes*
- * Offseason or practice squad member only

Coaching
- 2021–present: Toronto Varsity Blues (Linebackers coach)
- Stats at CFL.ca

Christopher Johnson (born April 18, 1991) is a Canadian former professional football linebacker. He is the linebackers coach for the Toronto Varsity Blues football team of U Sports.

== Early career ==
Johnson played high school football at Pickering High School, where he was an all-star in 2009. From 2010 to 2013, he played college football for the Toronto Varsity Blues. During his time with the Varsity Blues, he recorded 91 tackles, five sacks, and one interception returned for a touchdown. He also played in the CIS East-West Bowl in 2013.

== Professional career ==
=== Hamilton Tiger-Cats ===
At the CFL Regional Combine in Toronto, Johnson impressed scouts by recording a time of 4.74 seconds in the 40-yard dash, a vertical jump of 36 inches, and a broad jump of 118 inches. All three statistics were bests among the linebackers at the Toronto Combine. Johnson was selected by the Hamilton Tiger-Cats in the fifth round of the 2014 CFL draft with the 44th overall pick. He was placed on the practice squad before the start of the regular season. Making his CFL debut against the Edmonton Eskimos on September 20, Johnson eventually played in two games with the Tiger-Cats in their 2014 season and recorded two special teams tackles. He was re-signed by the Tiger-Cats on March 11, 2015. However, he was released during training camp on June 14, 2015.

=== Calgary Stampeders ===
Two days after being released, the Calgary Stampeders expressed immediate interest and signed Johnson on June 16, 2015. He was placed on the practice roster before the beginning of the regular season. He was released from the practice roster on August 10, 2015.

=== Montreal Alouettes ===
On December 21, 2016, Johnson signed with the Montreal Alouettes. However, he was released on May 1, 2017 and did not play in 2017.

== Coaching career ==
Johnson joined the Toronto Varsity Blues in 2021 to serve as the team's linebackers coach.
