= Salinicoccus =

Scientific classification
- Domain: Bacteria
- Kingdom: Bacillati
- Phylum: Bacillota
- Class: Bacilli
- Order: Caryophanales
- Family: Staphylococcaceae
- Genus: Salinicoccus; Ventosa et al. 1990

Type species
- Salinicoccus roseus Ventosa et al. 1990

Species
- See text

Synonyms
- Lacicoccus Bello et al. 2024

Genus of bacteria

Salinococcus is a genus of Gram-positive cocci belonging to the family Staphylococcaceae.

The genus name is derived from Latin salinus - saline, and Greek kokkos - a grain or berry). The genus was described in 1990 by Ventosa et al.

== Description ==
The genomic DNA G+C content of the species in this genus lies within the range of 46–51 mol%.

== Genome ==
No species in this genus has had its genome sequenced to date.

== Clinical ==
Species in this genus are not known to cause disease.

== Phylogeny ==
The currently accepted taxonomy is based on the List of Prokaryotic names with Standing in Nomenclature (LPSN) and National Center for Biotechnology Information (NCBI).

16S rRNA based LTP_10_2024

- Salinicoccus
  - - S. albus Chen et al. 2009
    - - - S. kunmingensis Chen et al. 2007
        - S. qingdaonensis Qu et al. 2012
      - - S. alkaliphilus Zhang et al. 2002
        - S. halitifaciens Ramana et al. 2013
  - - - - S. cyprini Talwar et al. 2020
        - - S. sesuvii Kämpfer et al. 2011
          - S. hispanicus (Marquez, Ventosa &
            Ruiz-Berraquero 1990) Ventosa et al. 1993
      - - S. halodurans Wang et al. 2008
        - - S. carnicancri Jung et al. 2010
          - S. sediminis Kumar et al. 2015
    - - - S. iranensis Amoozegar et al. 2008
        - - S. amylolyticus Srinivas et al. 2016
          - S. roseus Ventosa et al. 1990
      - - S. luteus Zhang et al. 2007
        - - S. salsiraiae França et al. 2007
          - - S. jeotgali Aslam et al. 2007
            - S. siamensis Pakdeeto et al. 2007

120 marker proteins based GTDB 09-RS220

- Salinicoccus
  - - - "Ca. S. merdavium" Gilroy et al. 2021
      - S. qingdaonensis
    - - S. alkaliphilus
      - - S. halitifaciens
        - "S. kekensis" Gao et al. 2010
  - - - S. albus
      - - S. halodurans
        - - "Ca. S. stercoripullorum" Gilroy et al. 2021
          - - S. carnicancri
            - S. sediminis
    - - - S. cyprini
        - S. hispanicus
      - - S. luteus
        - S. roseus

Unassigned species:

- "S. halophilus" Birdilla Selva Donio et al. 2018
- "S. marinus" Yong, Lee & Park 2003
- "S. salitudinis" Chen et al. 2008
