= Macrococcus =

Scientific classification
- Domain: Bacteria
- Kingdom: Bacillati
- Phylum: Bacillota
- Class: Bacilli
- Order: Caryophanales
- Family: Staphylococcaceae
- Genus: Macrococcus; Kloos et al. 1998

Type species
- Macrococcus equipercicus Kloos et al. 1998

Species
- See text

Genus of bacteria

Macrococcus, (from Ancient Greek μακρός (makrós), meaning "long", and κόκκος (kókkos), meaning "kernel" or "Kermes") is a genus of Gram-positive cocci belonging to the family Staphylococcaceae. The genus was created in 1998.

== History ==
The first recognised species in this genus (Macrococcus caseolyticus) was initially named Micrococcus caseolyticus by Evans in 1916. It was then renamed Staphylococcus caseolyticus by Schleifer et al in 1982. It received its current designation in 1998 by Kloos et al.

== Description ==
Members of the genus Macrococcus are Gram-positive, nonmotile, non-spore-forming cocci that are coagulase negative and catalase positive. They can be distinguished phenotypically from most staphylococci on the basis of their cellular morphology (they are 2.5 – 4.0 times larger in diameter compared to Staphylococcus aureus) and their positive cytochrome c oxidase reaction. Species in this genus are resistant to bacitracin and lysozyme and sensitive to furazolidone. The DNA base content is 38–45 mol% G+C. The cell walls lack teichoic acid. They are usually unencapsulated.

== Genome ==
The first genome of this genus was sequenced in 2009

== Evolution ==
This genus is the closest known relation of the genus Staphylococcus. Within Staphylococcus, the closest relations of Macrococcus appear to be the Staphylococcus sciuri group.

== Clinical ==
This genus is not known to cause human disease.

A methicillin resistance gene has been identified in this genus. The significance of this discovery is not yet clear.

== Etymology ==
The name Macrococcus is a masculine Neo-Latin noun composed of the Greek adjective makros (μάκρος) meaning "large" and the Neolatin masculine noun coccus intended to mean a coccus shaped bacterium, as it comes from the Greek masculine noun kokkos (κόκκος) meaning "berry", consequently the noun Macrococcus, means "large coccus".

The etymology of the epithet of the 8 species contained in the genus are:

- For M. bovicus Kloos et al. 1998, the epithet is the masculine form of bovicus, -a, -um, a Neolatin adjective derived from the Latin noun bos, bovis meaning "cow", given that the type strain was isolated from a cow.
- For M. brunensis Mannerová et al. 2003, the Latin masculine adjective brunensis meaning from Bruna, the Roman name of the city of Brünn in the Czech Republic, where the type strain was isolated.
- M. canis Gobeli Brawand et al. 2017
- For M. carouselicus Kloos et al. 1998, the Neolatin adjective carouselicus meaning "pertaining " to a carousel".
- For M. caseolyticus (Schleifer et al. 1982) Kloos et al. 1998, the epithet is a Neolatin adjective which is a combination of the Latin noun caseus meaning "cheese" and the Neolatin adjective lyticus (from the Greek adjective lutikos (λυτικός)) meaning "able to dissolve", to mean "casein-dissolving".
- For M. equipercicus Kloos et al. 1998, the epithet is a Neolatin adjective, meaning "pertaining to Percy, the horse", composed of the Latin noun equus, -i meaning "horse" and the Neolatinised English proper name "Percy" to Percus, -i, which is the name of the Irish thoroughbred horse from which the species was isolated (In Kloos et al. 1998 the component equus is said to be in the genitive case, but more correctly equi" is the root equ-" plus a joining "-i-" as first word is a Latin word,"c.f.").
- M. hajekii Mannerová et al. 2003 Neo-Latin genitive case noun hajekii, of Hájek, named after Wenceslaus Hajek, a Czech microbiologist.
- M. lamae Mannerová; et al. 2003 Neo-Latin feminine gender genitive case noun lamae, of Lama, the zoological genus name of the llama.

== Phylogeny ==
The currently accepted taxonomy is based on the List of Prokaryotic names with Standing in Nomenclature (LPSN) and National Center for Biotechnology Information (NCBI).

16S rRNA based LTP_10_2024

- Macrococcus
  - - M. hajekii
    - - M. equipercicus
      - - M. carouselicus
        - - M. lamae
          - - M. bovicus
            - M. brunensis
  - - M. armenti
    - - - M. canis
        - M. caseolyticus
      - - M. bohemicus
        - - M. epidermidis
          - M. goetzii

120 marker proteins based GTDB 09-RS220

- - Macrococcus
    - - M. equipercicus Kloos et al. 1998
      - M. lamae Mannerová et al. 2003
    - - - M. carouselicus Kloos et al. 1998
        - M. hajekii Mannerová et al. 2003
      - - M. bovicus Kloos et al. 1998
        - M. brunensis Mannerová et al. 2003
  - Macrococcoides
    - - M. bohemicum corrig. (Mašlaňová et al. 2018) Bello et al. 2024
      - - "M. epidermidis" (Mašlaňová et al. 2018) Bello et al. 2023
        - M. goetzii (Mašlaňová et al. 2018) Bello et al. 2024
    - - "M. armenti" (Keller et al. 2022) Bello et al. 2023
      - - M. canis (Brawand et al. 2017) Bello et al. 2024
        - M. caseolyticum corrig. (Schleifer et al. 1982) Bello et al. 2024
