= Aquibacillus albus =

Scientific classification
- Domain: Bacteria
- Kingdom: Bacillati
- Phylum: Bacillota
- Class: Bacilli
- Order: Bacillales
- Family: Bacillaceae
- Genus: Aquibacillus
- Species: A. albus

Binomial name
- Aquibacillus albus Amoozegar et al. 2014

Type strain
- DSM 23711, IBRC-M 10798, JCM 17364, YIM 93624

Synonyms
- Virgibacillus albus

Species of bacterium

Aquibacillus albus is a Gram-positive, strictly anaerobic and moderately halophilic bacterium from the genus of Aquibacillus which has been isolated from the Lop Nur lake from Xinjiang in China.
