= Lesley Hoyles =

Welsh microbiologist

- Education: Imperial College London; University of Reading
- Scientific career
- Workplaces: University College Cork; Imperial College London; University of Westminster; Nottingham Trent University
- Thesis: In vitro examination of the effect of orlistat on the ability of the faecal microbiota to utilize dietary lipids. (2009)

Lesley Hoyles is a Welsh microbiologist who is Professor of Microbiome and Systems Biology at Nottingham Trent University. She combines in vivo and in vitro microbiology and bioinformatics research to better understand how the gut microbiota influences health and disease.

== Early life and education ==
Hoyles was born in Swansea. She was an undergraduate student in microbiology at the University of Reading. After graduating, she trained as a taxonomist at the Institute of Food Research, Reading where she studied Gram-positive anaerobes that had been isolated from veterinary and clinical sources. Hoyles remained at the University of Reading for postgraduate research, working in the laboratory of Glenn Gibson as a GlaxoSmithKline-sponsored researcher. Her PhD worked considered the role of the anti-obesity therapy orlistat on the human gut microbiota. After her PhD Hoyles was awarded an IRCSET research fellowship, and joined Douwe van Sinderen's phage laboratory at University College Cork to work on gut-associated bacteriophages. She returned to the UK on a Medical Research Council advanced scholarship to undertake a master's degree in bioinformatics and theoretical systems biology at Imperial College London.

== Research and career ==
Hoyles' early research concerned the characterisation of fastidious anaerobes isolated from clinical and veterinary sources. Her PhD studies led to her interest in the influence of the gut microbiota on human health and disease. After completing her master's degree at Imperial College London, Hoyles worked on translational systems biology as a postdoctoral research associate and started to investigate host–microbiome interactions. In 2014 Hoyles was appointed a Lecturer in Microbiology at the University of Westminster. She returned to Imperial College London in 2016 as an MRC Intermediate Research Fellow in Data Science to continue her microbiome work. In 2018 she joined Nottingham Trent University as an Associate Professor in Microbiology. She was promoted to full Professor in 2020.

Hoyles' work combines in vivo and in vitro microbiology and bioinformatics approaches to uncover the role of gut microbiota in mammalian health. She has demonstrated the contribution of gut microbial metabolites to the disease phenotype of non-alcoholic fatty liver disease. With Dr Simon McArthur she has demonstrated that gut-derived microbial metabolites interact directly with the blood–brain barrier. She also showed the dietary substrate trimethylamine N-oxide (TMAO) is subject to metabolic retroconversion.

Hoyles and McArthur identified that TMAO, a molecule found in fish and seafood, may play a role in improving cognitive function by strengthening the blood–brain barrier.
