= Glenn Gibson =

Glenn R. Gibson is professor of food microbiology at the University of Reading. He co-coined the term prebiotics in a 1995 scientific paper. He received his PhD in 1986 from the University of Dundee for a thesis on the subject of "The ecology and physiology of sulphate-reducing bacteria in anaerobic marine and estuarine sediments".

== Selected publications ==
- Functional Foods: Concept to Product. CRC Press, Boca Raton, 2000. (edited with Christine M. Williams)
- Handbook of Prebiotics. CRC Press, Boca Raton, 2008. (edited with Marcel Roberfroid)
