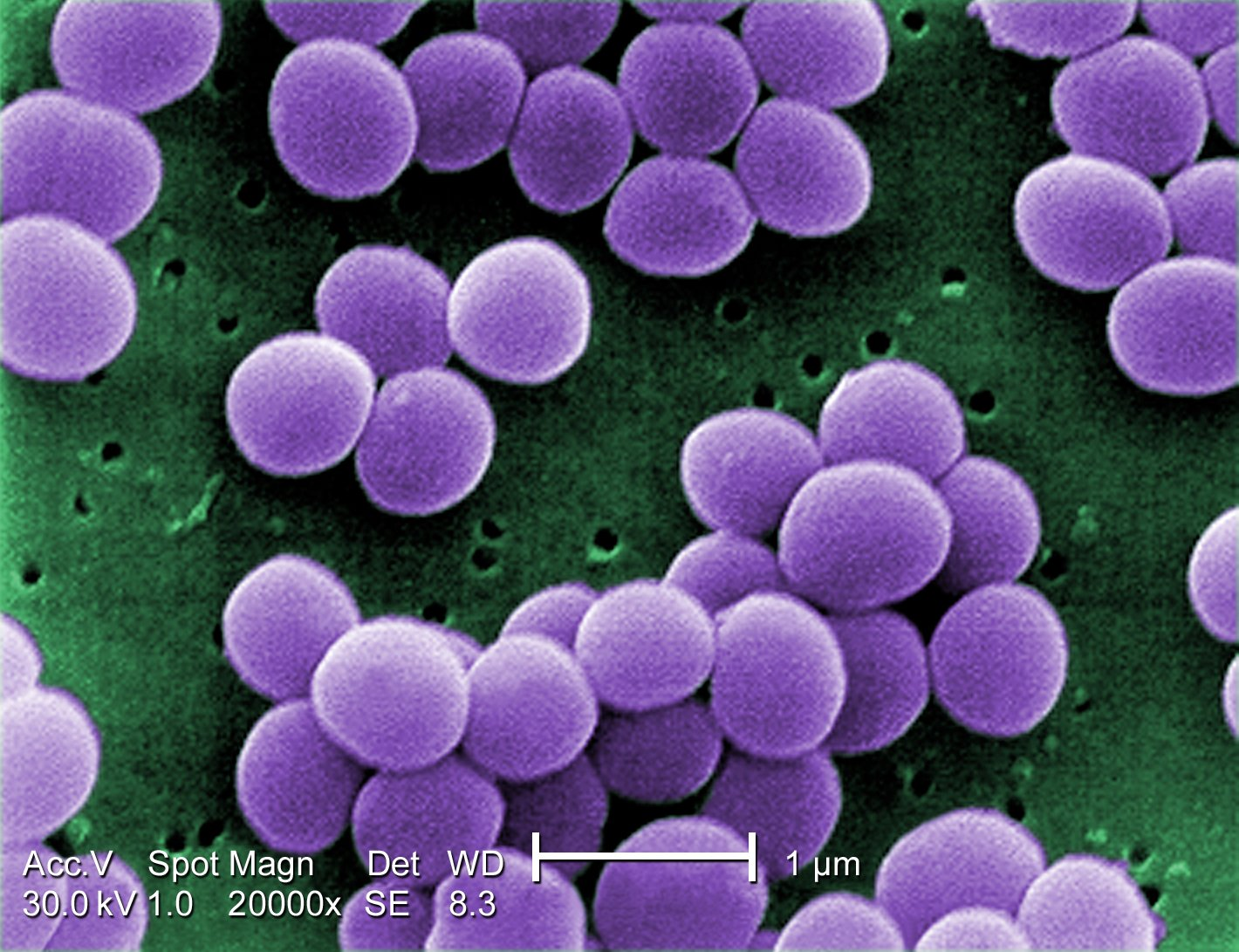
- Staphylococcus aureus

Scientific classification
- Domain: Bacteria
- Kingdom: Bacillati
- Phylum: Bacillota
- Class: Bacilli
- Order: Bacillales
- Family: Staphylococcaceae; Akatov et al. 1988 ex Schleifer and Bell 2010

Genera
- See text

Synonyms
- Staphylococceae Prévot 1940

= Staphylococcaceae =

Family of bacteria

Staphylococcaceae, from Ancient Greek σταφυλή (staphulḗ), meaning "bunch of grapes", and κόκκος (kókkos), meaning "sphere", are a family of Gram-positive bacteria that includes the genus Staphylococcus, noted for encompassing several medically significant pathogens.

The five genera Jeotgalicoccus, Macrococcus, Nosocomiicoccus, Salinicoccus, and Staphylococcus have been shown to be monophyletic, while Gemella appears to be polyphyletic. The pathogen methicillin-resistant Staphylococcus aureus is a member of this family.

The most famous species in this family is Staphylococcus aureus, usually found in the skin microbiota. Staphylococcus aureus is the pathogenic bacteria with the highest global mortality in 2019, with approximatively 1.1 million deaths.

== Phylogeny ==
The currently accepted taxonomy is based on the List of Prokaryotic names with Standing in Nomenclature (LPSN) and National Center for Biotechnology Information (NCBI).

GTDB (below) renames this taxon "Staphylococcales", as it finds that the evolutionary divergence within this taxon is more fitting of an order. Bello et al. (2023) puts the GTDB approach to familial division into a formal proposal, but the proposed names have yet to appear on any Validation List.

16S rRNA based LTP_10_2024

- - - Staphylococcales Staphylococcaceae
      - Macrococcus Kloos et al. 1998
        [incl. Macrococcoides Bello et al. 2024]
      - - - - Abyssicoccus Jiang et al. 2016
            - Auricoccus Prakash et al. 2017
          - - - Corticicoccus Li et al. 2017
              - - Nosocomiicoccus Morais et al. 2008
                - - Aliicoccus Amoozegar et al. 2014
                  - Jeotgalicoccus Yoon et al. 2003
                    [incl. Phocicoccus Bello et al. 2024]
            - Salinicoccus Ventosa et al. 1990
        - - Mammaliicoccus stepanovicii
          - - Mammaliicoccus
            - - Mammaliicoccus vitulinus
              - - Mammaliicoccus lentus
                - - Mammaliicoccus sciuri (Kloos, Schleifer &
                    Smith 1976) Madhaiyan, Wirth & Saravanan 2020
                  - Staphylococcus Rosenbach 1884
  - - - - Gemellaceae
          Gemella Berger 1960
      - other
    - Lactobacillales

120 marker proteins based GTDB 09-RS220

- - - - Staphylococcales
        - - Gemellaceae
            Gemella Berger 1960
        - - - Abyssicoccaceae
              Abyssicoccus [incl. Auricoccus]
            - Salinicoccaceae
              - - - Phocicoccus
                  - Nosocomiicoccus
                - Jeotgalicoccus
              - - Aliicoccus
                - Salinicoccus
          - - Staphylococcaceae
              - - Macrococcus
                - Macrococcoides
              - - Mammaliicoccus
                - Staphylococcus
    - other
  - Lactobacillales

Unassigned genus:

== See also ==
- List of Bacteria genera
- List of bacterial orders
