= Infection rate =

Measure of the chance or risk of a population contracting an infectious disease

An infection rate or incident rate is the probability or risk of an infection in a population. It is used to measure the frequency of occurrence of new instances of infection within a population during a specific time period.

$$\text{Rate of infection} = K \times \frac{\text{the number of infections}}{\text{the number of those at risk of infection}}$$

The number of infections equals the cases identified in the study or observed. An example would be HIV infection during a specific time period in the defined population. The population at risk are the cases appearing in the population during the same time period. An example would be all the people in a city during a specific time period. The constant K is assigned a value of 100% to represent a percentage. An example would be to find the percentage of people in a city who are infected with HIV: 6,000 cases in March divided by the population of a city (one million), which equals 0.006, multiplied by the constant (K) would give an infection rate of 0.6%.

Calculating the infection rate is used to analyze trends for the purpose of infection and disease control. An online infection rate calculator has been developed by the Centers for Disease Control and Prevention that allows the determination of the streptococcal A infection rate in a population.

== Clinical applications ==
Health care facilities routinely track their infection rates according to the guidelines issued by the Joint Commission. The healthcare-associated infection (HAI) rates measure infection of patients in a particular hospital. This allows rates to compared with other hospitals. These infections can often be prevented when healthcare facilities follow guidelines for safe care. To get payment from Medicare, hospitals are required to report data about some infections to the Centers for Disease Control and Prevention's (CDC's) National Healthcare Safety Network (NHSN). Hospitals currently submit information on central line-associated bloodstream infections (CLABSIs), catheter-associated urinary tract infections (CAUTIs), surgical site infections (SSIs), MRSA Bacteremia, and C. difficile laboratory-identified events. The public reporting of these data is an effort by the Department of Health and Human Services.

For meaningful comparisons of infection rates, populations must be very similar between the two or more assessments. However, a problem with mean rates is that they cannot reflect differences in risk between populations,
