= Safe Care Campaign =

The Safe Care Campaign is an Atlanta, Georgia (United States) based corporation seeking to help eradicate hospital acquired infections. Its goal is to instigate a national change in ideology and practices within the health care environment in regard to hand hygiene. The organization compiles, develops, distributes and promotes educational resource material and targeted media campaigns to inform and assist patients and medical providers.

The campaign partners with other like-minded organizations and individuals to promote its patient safety efforts and has been active in efforts against so-called 'Superbugs' which are resistant to antibiotics.

Safe Care Campaign was founded by Victoria and Armando Nahum after three members of their family acquired nosocomial infections in hospitals in three different states in the timespan of a year, ultimately resulting in the death of their son, Joshua.
