= Hospital-acquired infection =

Infection spread in hospitals or health care facilities

Nosocomial infection
- Other names: HAI (Healthcare-Associated Infections)
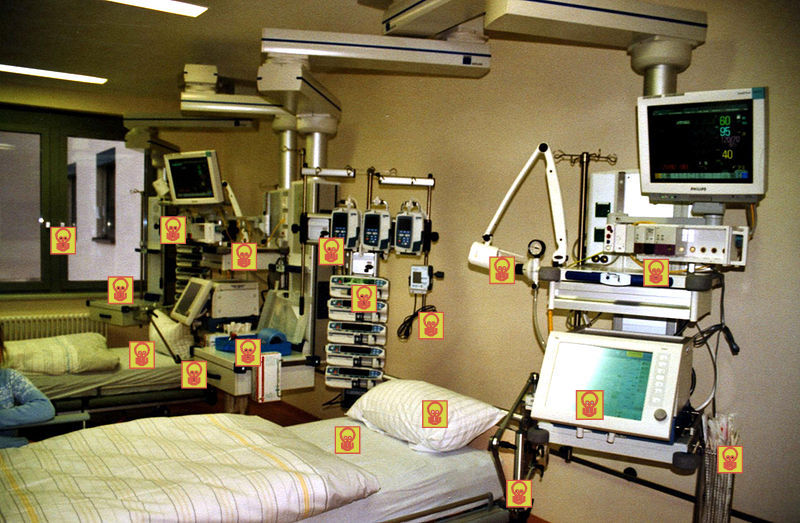
- Contaminated surfaces increase cross-transmission
- Specialty: Infectious disease

A hospital-acquired infection (HAI), also known as a nosocomial infection (from Greek nosokomeîon "hospital, infirmary", from nósos "disease" + koméō "to tend, care for", with locative suffix -eîon), is an infection that is acquired in a hospital or other healthcare facility. To encompass both hospital and non-hospital settings, it is sometimes instead called a healthcare-associated infection. Such an infection can be acquired in a hospital, nursing home, rehabilitation facility, outpatient clinic, diagnostic laboratory or other clinical settings. The term nosocomial infection is used when there is a lack of evidence that the infection was present when the patient entered the healthcare setting, thus meaning it was acquired or became problematic post-admission.

A number of dynamic processes can bring contamination into operating rooms and other areas within nosocomial settings. Infection is spread to the susceptible patient in the clinical setting by various means. Healthcare staff also spread infection, as can contaminated equipment, bed linens, or air droplets. The infection can originate from the outside environment, another infected patient, staff that may be infected, or—in some cases—the source of infection cannot be determined. In some cases the microorganism originates from the patient's own skin microbiota, becoming opportunistic after surgery or other procedures that compromise the protective skin barrier or immune system. Though the patient may have contracted the infection from their own skin, the infection is still considered nosocomial since it develops in the health care setting.

== Effects ==
During 2002 in the United States, the Centers for Disease Control and Prevention estimated that roughly 1.7 million healthcare-associated infections occurred, from all types of microorganisms, including bacteria and fungi; such infections caused or contributed to an estimated 99,000 deaths. In Europe, where hospital surveys have been conducted, the category of gram-negative infections are estimated to account for two-thirds of the 25,000 HAI-related deaths each year. Nosocomial infections can cause severe pneumonia and infections of the urinary tract, bloodstream and other parts of the body. Many types display antimicrobial resistance, which can complicate treatment.

In the UK about 300,000 patients were affected in 2017, and this was estimated to cost the NHS about £1 billion a year.

== Types ==
- Hospital-acquired pneumonia
- Ventilator-associated pneumonia
- Urinary tract infection
- Gastroenteritis
- Puerperal fever
- Central line-associated blood stream infection

=== Organisms ===
- Staphylococcus aureus
- Methicillin-resistant Staphylococcus aureus
- Candida albicans
- Pseudomonas aeruginosa
- Acinetobacter baumannii
- Stenotrophomonas maltophilia
- Clostridioides difficile
- Escherichia coli
- Tuberculosis
- Vancomycin-resistant Enterococcus
- Legionnaires' disease

== Cause ==
=== Transmission ===
In-dwelling catheters have recently been identified with hospital-acquired infections. To deal with this complication, procedures are used, called intravascular antimicrobial lock therapy, that can reduce infections that are unexposed to blood-borne antibiotics. Introducing antibiotics, including ethanol, into the catheter (without flushing it into the bloodstream) reduces the formation of biofilms.

Main routes of transmission
Route	Description
Contact transmission	The most important and frequent mode of transmission of nosocomial infections is by direct contact.
Droplet transmission	Transmission occurs when droplets containing microbes from the infected person are propelled a short distance through the air and deposited on the patient's body; droplets are generated from the source person mainly by coughing, sneezing, and talking, and during the performance of certain procedures, such as bronchoscopy.
Airborne transmission	Dissemination can be either airborne droplet nuclei (small-particle residue {5 μm or smaller in size} of evaporated droplets containing microorganisms that remain suspended in the air for long periods of time) or dust particles containing the infectious agent. Microorganisms carried in this manner can be dispersed widely by air currents and may become inhaled by a susceptible host within the same room or over a longer distance from the source patient, depending on environmental factors; therefore, special air-handling and ventilation are required to prevent airborne transmission. Microorganisms transmitted by airborne transmission include Legionella, Mycobacterium tuberculosis and the rubeola and varicella viruses.
Common vehicle transmission	This applies to microorganisms transmitted to the host by contaminated fomite items, such as food, water, medications, devices, and equipment.
Vector borne transmission	This occurs when vectors such as mosquitoes, flies, rats, and other vermin transmit microorganisms.

Contact transmission is divided into two subgroups: direct-contact transmission and indirect-contact transmission.

Routes of contact transmission
Route	Description
Direct-contact transmission	This involves a direct body surface-to-body surface contact and physical transfer of microorganisms between a susceptible host and an infected or colonized person, such as when a person turns a patient, gives a patient a bath, or performs other patient-care activities that require direct personal contact. Direct-contact transmission also can occur between two patients, with one serving as the source of the infectious microorganisms and the other as a susceptible host.
Indirect-contact transmission	This involves contact of a susceptible host with a contaminated intermediate object, usually inanimate, such as contaminated instruments, needles, or dressings, or contaminated gloves that are not changed between patients. In addition, the improper use of saline flush syringes, vials, and bags has been implicated in disease transmission in the US, even when healthcare workers had access to gloves, disposable needles, intravenous devices, and flushes.

==== Patient susceptibility ====
Alongside reducing vectors for transmission, patient susceptibility to hospital-acquired infections needs to be considered. Factors which render patients at greater risk of infections include:

1. Receipt of immunosuppressive medications such as glucocorticoids or immunosuppressive drugs as part of treatments for cancer, organ transplantation or autoimmune diseases
2. Impaired immunity due to diseases such as haematological malignancy, primary immunodeficiency, HIV/AIDS or critical illness, including severe COVID-19
3. Presence of indwelling devices which breach natural defences, including endotracheal tubes, central venous catheters and urinary catheters.
4. The use of antibiotics does not, itself, increase risk of hospital-acquired infections, but does contribute to the prevalence of antimicrobial resistant organisms amongst patients with hospital-acquired infections

==== Device-associated infections ====
Given the association between invasive devices and hospital-acquired infections, specific terms are used to delineate such infections to allow for monitoring and prevention. Noted device-associated infections include ventilator-associated pneumonia, catheter-associated blood stream infections, catheter-associated urinary tract infections and device-associated ventriculitis. Surveillance for these infections is commonly undertaken and reported by bodies such as the European Centre for Disease Prevention and Control and Centers for Disease Control and Prevention.

== Prevention ==
Controlling nosocomial infection is to implement QA/QC measures to the health care sectors, and evidence-based management can be a feasible approach. For those with ventilator-associated or hospital-acquired pneumonia, controlling and monitoring hospital indoor air quality needs to be on agenda in management, whereas for nosocomial rotavirus infection, a hand hygiene protocol has to be enforced.

To reduce the number of hospital-acquired infections, the state of Maryland implemented the Maryland Hospital-Acquired Conditions Program that provides financial rewards and penalties for individual hospitals. An adaptation of the Centers for Medicare & Medicaid Services payment policy causes poor-performing hospitals to lose up to 3% of their inpatient revenues, whereas hospitals that are able to decrease hospital-acquired infections can earn up to 3% in rewards. During the program's first two years, complication rates fell by 15.26% across all hospital-acquired conditions tracked by the state (including those not covered by the program), from a risk-adjusted complication rate of 2.38 per 1,000 people in 2009 to a rate of 2.02 in 2011. The 15.26% decline translates into more than $100 million in cost savings for the health care system in Maryland, with the largest savings coming from avoidance of urinary tract infections, sepsis and other severe infections, and pneumonia and other lung infections. If similar results could be achieved nationwide, the Medicare program would save an estimated $1.3 billion over two years, while the US healthcare system as a whole would save $5.3 billion.

=== Sanitation ===
Hospitals have sanitation protocols regarding uniforms, equipment sterilization, washing, and other preventive measures. Thorough hand washing and use of alcohol rubs by all medical personnel before and after each patient contact is one of the most effective ways to combat nosocomial infections. More careful use of antimicrobial agents, such as antibiotics, is also considered vital. As many hospital-acquired infections caused by bacteria such as methicillin-resistant Staphylococcus aureus, methicillin-susceptible Staphylococcus aureus, and Clostridioides difficile are caused by a breach of these protocols, it is common that affected patients make medical negligence claims against the hospital in question.

Sanitizing surfaces is part of control measures to reduce nosocomial infections in healthcare environments. Modern sanitizing methods such as non-flammable alcohol vapor in carbon dioxide systems have been effective against gastroenteritis, methicillin-resistant Staphylococcus aureus, and influenza agents. The use of hydrogen peroxide vapor has been clinically proven to reduce infection rates and risk of acquisition. Hydrogen peroxide is effective against endospore-forming bacteria, such as Clostridioides difficile, whereas alcohol is ineffective. Ultraviolet cleaning devices may also be used to disinfect the rooms of patients infected with Clostridioides difficile or methicillin-resistant Staphylococcus aureus after discharge.

Despite sanitation protocol, patients cannot be entirely isolated from infectious agents. Furthermore, patients are often prescribed antibiotics and other antimicrobial drugs to help treat illness; this may increase the selection pressure for the emergence of resistant strains.

=== Sterilization ===
Sterilization goes further than just sanitizing. It kills all microorganisms on equipment and surfaces through exposure to chemicals, ionizing radiation, dry heat, or steam under pressure.

=== Isolation ===
Isolation is the implementation of isolating precautions designed to prevent transmission of microorganisms by common routes in hospitals. (See Universal precautions and Transmission-based precautions.) Because agent and host factors are more difficult to control, interruption of transfer of microorganisms is directed primarily at transmission for example isolation of infectious cases in special hospitals and isolation of patient with infected wounds in special rooms also isolation of joint transplantation patients on specific rooms.

=== Handwashing ===
Handwashing frequently is called the single most important measure to reduce the risks of transmitting skin microorganisms from one person to another or from one site to another on the same patient. Washing hands as promptly and thoroughly as possible between patient contacts and after contact with blood, body fluids, secretions, excretions, and equipment or articles contaminated by them is an important component of infection control and isolation precautions. The spread of nosocomial infections, among immunocompromised patients is connected with health care workers' hand contamination in almost 40% of cases, and is a challenging problem in the modern hospitals. The best way for workers to overcome this problem is conducting correct hand-hygiene procedures; this is why the WHO launched in 2005 the GLOBAL Patient Safety Challenge.

Two categories of micro-organisms can be present on health care workers' hands: transient flora and resident flora. The first is represented by the micro-organisms taken by workers from the environment, and the bacteria in it are capable of surviving on the human skin and sometimes to grow. The second group is represented by the permanent micro-organisms living on the skin surface (on the stratum corneum or immediately under it). They are capable of surviving on the human skin and to grow freely on it. They have low pathogenicity and infection rate, and they create a kind of protection from the colonization from other more pathogenic bacteria. The skin of workers is colonized by 3.9 × 10^{4} – 4.6 × 10^{6} cfu/cm^{2}. The microbes comprising the resident flora are: Staphylococcus epidermidis, Staphylococcus hominis, and Micrococcus, Propionibacterium, Corynebacterium, Dermabacter, and Pittosporum spp., while transient organisms are Staphylococcus aureus, and Klebsiella pneumoniae, and Acinetobacter, Enterobacter and Candida spp. The goal of hand hygiene is to eliminate the transient flora with a careful and proper performance of hand washing, using different kinds of soap, (normal and antiseptic), and alcohol-based gels. The main problems found in the practice of hand hygiene is connected with the lack of available sinks and time-consuming performance of hand washing. An easy way to resolve this problem could be the use of alcohol-based hand rubs, because of faster application compared to correct hand-washing.

Improving patient hand washing has also been shown to reduce the rate of nosocomial infection. Patients who are bed-bound often do not have as much access to clean their hands at mealtimes or after touching surfaces or handling waste such as tissues. By reinforcing the importance of handwashing and providing sanitizing gel or wipes within reach of the bed, nurses were directly able to reduce infection rates. A study published in 2017 demonstrated this by improving patient education on both proper hand-washing procedure and important times to use sanitizer and successfully reduced the rate of enterococci and Staphylococcus aureus.

All visitors must follow the same procedures as hospital staff to adequately control the spread of infections. Moreover, multidrug-resistant infections can leave the hospital and become part of the community flora if steps are not taken to stop this transmission.

It is unclear whether or not nail polish or rings affected surgical wound infection rates.

=== Gloves ===
In addition to hand washing, gloves play an important role in reducing the risks of transmission of microorganisms. Gloves are worn for three important reasons in hospitals. First, they are worn to provide a protective barrier for personnel, preventing large scale contamination of the hands when touching blood, body fluids, secretions, excretions, mucous membranes, and non-intact skin. In the United States, the Occupational Safety and Health Administration has mandated wearing gloves to reduce the risk of bloodborne pathogen infections. Second, gloves are worn to reduce the likelihood that microorganisms present on the hands of personnel will be transmitted to patients during invasive or other patient-care procedures that involve touching a patient's mucous membranes and nonintact skin. Third, they are worn to reduce the likelihood that the hands of personnel contaminated with micro-organisms from a patient or a fomite can transmit those micro-organisms to another patient. In this situation, gloves must be changed between patient contacts, and hands should be washed after gloves are removed.

=== Antimicrobial surfaces ===
Micro-organisms are known to survive on inanimate "touch" surfaces for extended periods of time. This can be especially troublesome in hospital environments where immunodeficient patients are at enhanced risk for contracting nosocomial infections. Patients with hospital-acquired infections are predominantly hospitalized in different types of intensive care units (ICUs).

Touch surfaces commonly found in hospital rooms, such as bed rails, call buttons, touch plates, chairs, door handles, light switches, grab rails, intravenous poles, dispensers (alcohol gel, paper towel, soap), dressing trolleys, and counter and table tops are known to be contaminated with Staphylococcus, methicillin-resistant Staphylococcus aureus (one of the most virulent strains of antibiotic-resistant bacteria) and vancomycin-resistant Enterococcus. Objects in closest proximity to patients have the highest levels of methicillin-resistant Staphylococcus aureus and vancomycin-resistant Enterococcus. This is why touch surfaces in hospital rooms can serve as sources, or reservoirs, for the spread of bacteria from the hands of healthcare workers and visitors to patients.

A number of compounds can decrease the risk of bacteria growing on surfaces including: copper, silver, and germicides.

There have been a number of studies evaluating the use of no-touch cleaning systems particularly the use of ultraviolet C devices. One review was inconclusive due to lack of, or of poor quality evidence. Other reviews have found some evidence, and growing evidence of their effectiveness.

== Treatment ==
Two of the bacteria species most likely to infect patients are the Gram-positive strains of methicillin-resistant Staphylococcus aureus (MRSA), and Gram-negative Acinetobacter baumannii. While antibiotic drugs to treat diseases caused by methicillin-resistant Staphylococcus aureus are available, few effective drugs are available for Acinetobacter. Acinetobacter bacteria are evolving and becoming immune to antibiotics, so in many cases, polymyxin-type antibacterials need to be used. "In many respects it's far worse than MRSA", said a specialist at Case Western Reserve University.

Another growing disease, especially prevalent in New York City hospitals, is the drug-resistant, Gram-negative Klebsiella pneumoniae. An estimated more than 20% of the Klebsiella infections in Brooklyn hospitals "are now resistant to virtually all modern antibiotics, and those supergerms are now spreading worldwide."

The bacteria, classified as Gram-negative because of their color on the Gram stain, can cause severe pneumonia and infections of the urinary tract, bloodstream, and other parts of the body. Their cell structures make them more difficult to attack with antibiotics than Gram-positive organisms like methicillin-resistant Staphylococcus aureus. In some cases, antibiotic resistance is spreading to Gram-negative bacteria that can infect people outside the hospital. "For gram-positives we need better drugs; for gram-negatives we need any drugs", said Brad Spellberg, an infectious-disease specialist at Harbor–UCLA Medical Center, and the author of Rising Plague, a book about drug-resistant pathogens.

Hospital-acquired pneumonia (HAP) is the second most common nosocomial infection and accounts for approximately one-fourth of all infections in the intensive care unit (ICU). HAP, or nosocomial pneumonia, is a lower respiratory infection that was not incubating at the time of hospital admission and that presents clinically two or more days after hospitalization. Ventilator-associated pneumonia (VAP) is defined as HAP in patients receiving mechanical ventilation. The incidence of VAP is 10–30% among patients who require mechanical ventilation for >48 h. A standard treatment protocol is based on accurate diagnosis definitions, microbiological confirmation of VAP, and the administration of imipenem plus ciprofloxacin as initial empirical antibiotic treatment.

One-third of nosocomial infections are considered preventable. The CDC estimates 687,000 people in the United States were infected by hospital-acquired infections in 2015, resulting in 72,000 deaths. The most common nosocomial infections are of the urinary tract, surgical site and various pneumonias.

An alternative treatment targeting localised infections is the use of irradiation by ultraviolet C.

== Epidemiology ==
The methods used differ from country to country (definitions used, type of nosocomial infections covered, health units surveyed, inclusion or exclusion of imported infections, etc.), so the international comparisons of nosocomial infection rates should be made with the utmost care.

=== Belgium ===
In Belgium, the prevalence of nosocomial infections is about 6.2%. Annually about 125,500 patients become infected by a nosocomial infection, resulting in almost 3000 deaths. The extra costs for the health insurance are estimated to be approximately €400 million/year.

=== France ===
Estimates ranged from 6.7% in 1990 to 7.4% (patients may have several infections). At national level, prevalence among patients in health care facilities was 6.7% in 1996, 5.9% in 2001 and 5.0% in 2006. The rates for nosocomial infections were 7.6% in 1996, 6.4% in 2001 and 5.4% in 2006.

In 2006, the most common infection sites were urinary tract infections (30.3%), pneumopathy (14.7%), infections of surgery site (14.2%). Infections of the skin and mucous membrane (10.2%), other respiratory infections (6.8%) and bacterial infections / blood poisoning (6.4%). The rates among adult patients in intensive care were 13.5% in 2004, 14.6% in 2005, 14.1% in 2006 and 14.4% in 2007.

Nosocomial infections are estimated to make patients stay in the hospital for four to five additional days. Around 2004–2005, about 9,000 people died each year with a nosocomial infection, of which about 4,200 would have survived without this infection.

=== Finland ===
Rate was estimated at 8.5% of patients in 2005.

=== Italy ===
Since 2000, estimates show about a 6.7% infection rate, i.e. between 450,000 and 700,000 patients, which caused between 4,500 and 7,000 deaths. A survey in Lombardy gave a rate of 4.9% of patients in 2000.

=== Switzerland ===
Estimates range between 2 and 14%. A national survey gave a rate of 7.2% in 2004.

=== United Kingdom ===
In 2012, the Health Protection Agency reported the prevalence rate of hospital-acquired infections in England was 6.4% in 2011, against a rate of 8.2% in 2006, with respiratory tract, urinary tract and surgical site infections the most common types of infections reported. In 2018, it was reported that in-hospital infections had risen from 5,972 in 2008 to 48,815 in 2017. In 2023, it was reported that there are c.250 scabies outbreaks in semi-closed institutions such as hospitals and care homes in England and Wales annually.

=== United States ===
The Centers for Disease Control and Prevention (CDC) estimated roughly 1.7 million hospital-associated infections, from all types of bacteria combined, cause or contribute to 99,000 deaths each year. Other estimates indicate 10%, or 2 million, patients a year become infected, with the annual cost ranging from $4.5 billion to $11 billion. In the US, the most frequent types of hospital infections are catheter-associated urinary tract infection (32%), followed by surgical site infection (22%), and ventilator-associated pneumonia (15%).

== History ==
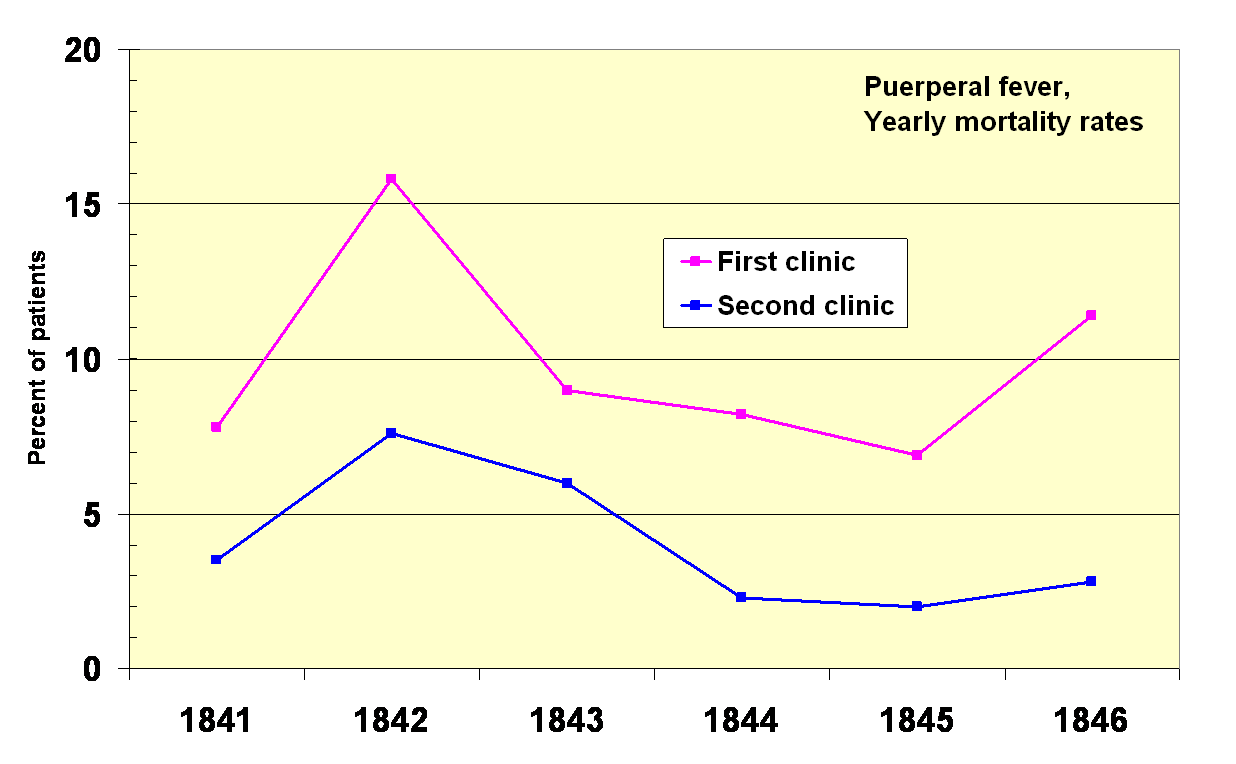
Mortality rates 1841–1846 in two clinics documented by Semmelweis

In 1841, Ignaz Semmelweis, a Hungarian obstetrician was working at a Vienna maternity hospital. He was "shocked" by the death rate of women who developed puerperal fever. He documented that mortality was three times higher in the ward where the medical students were delivering babies than in the next ward that was staffed by midwifery students. The medical students were also routinely working with cadavers. He compared the rates of infection with a similar hospital in Dublin, Ireland, and hypothesized that it was the medical students who somehow were infecting the women after labor. He instituted mandatory hand-washing in May 1847 and infection rates dropped dramatically. Louis Pasteur proposed the germ theory of disease and began his work on cholera in 1865 by identifying that it was microorganisms that were associated with disease.

== See also ==
- Cubicle curtain
- ESKAPE
- Infection control
- Iatrogenesis
- Phototherapy
- Sanitation Standard Operating Procedures
