= Commensalism =

Beneficial symbiosis between species

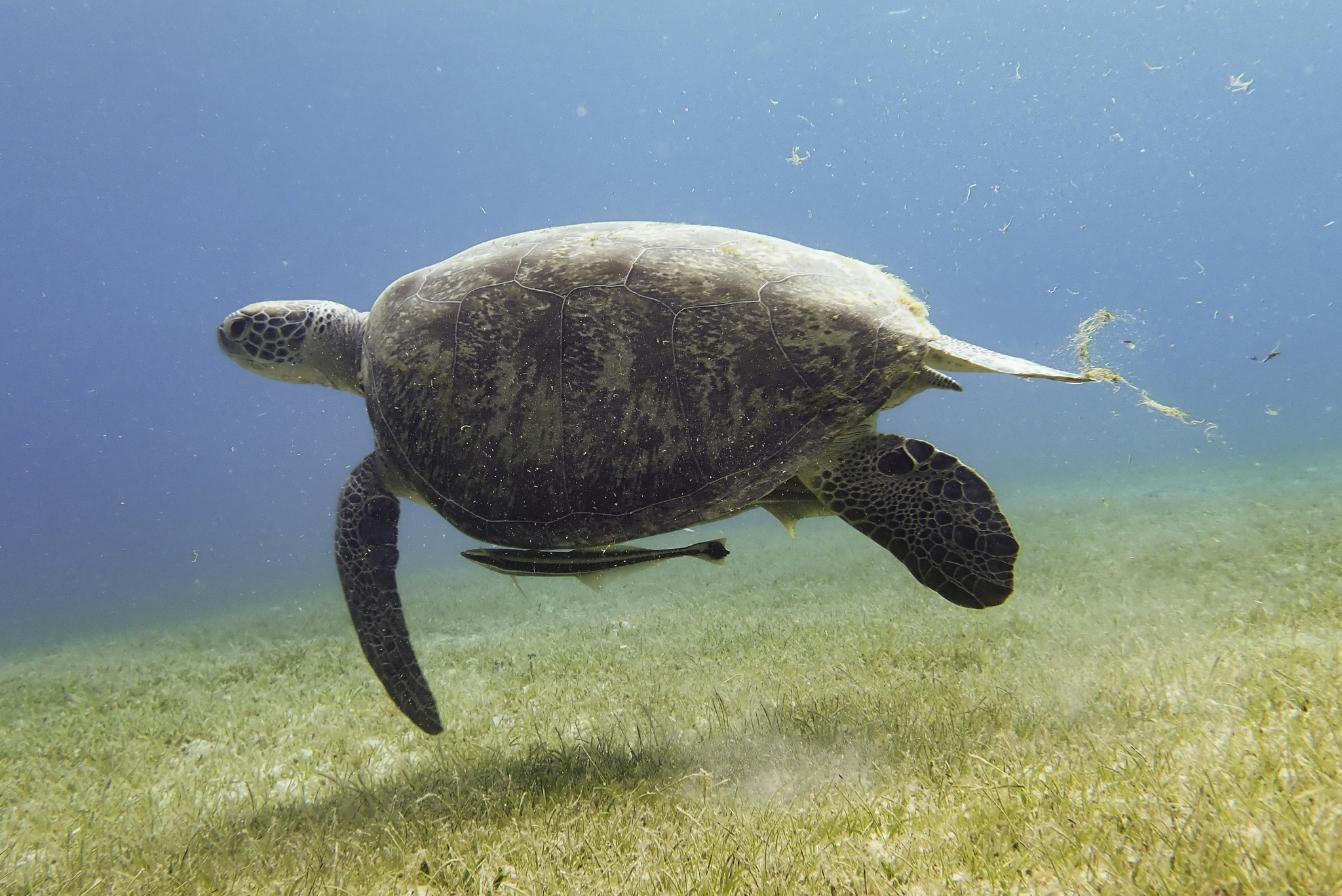
Remora are specially adapted to attach themselves to larger fish (or other animals, in this case a sea turtle) that provide locomotion and food.

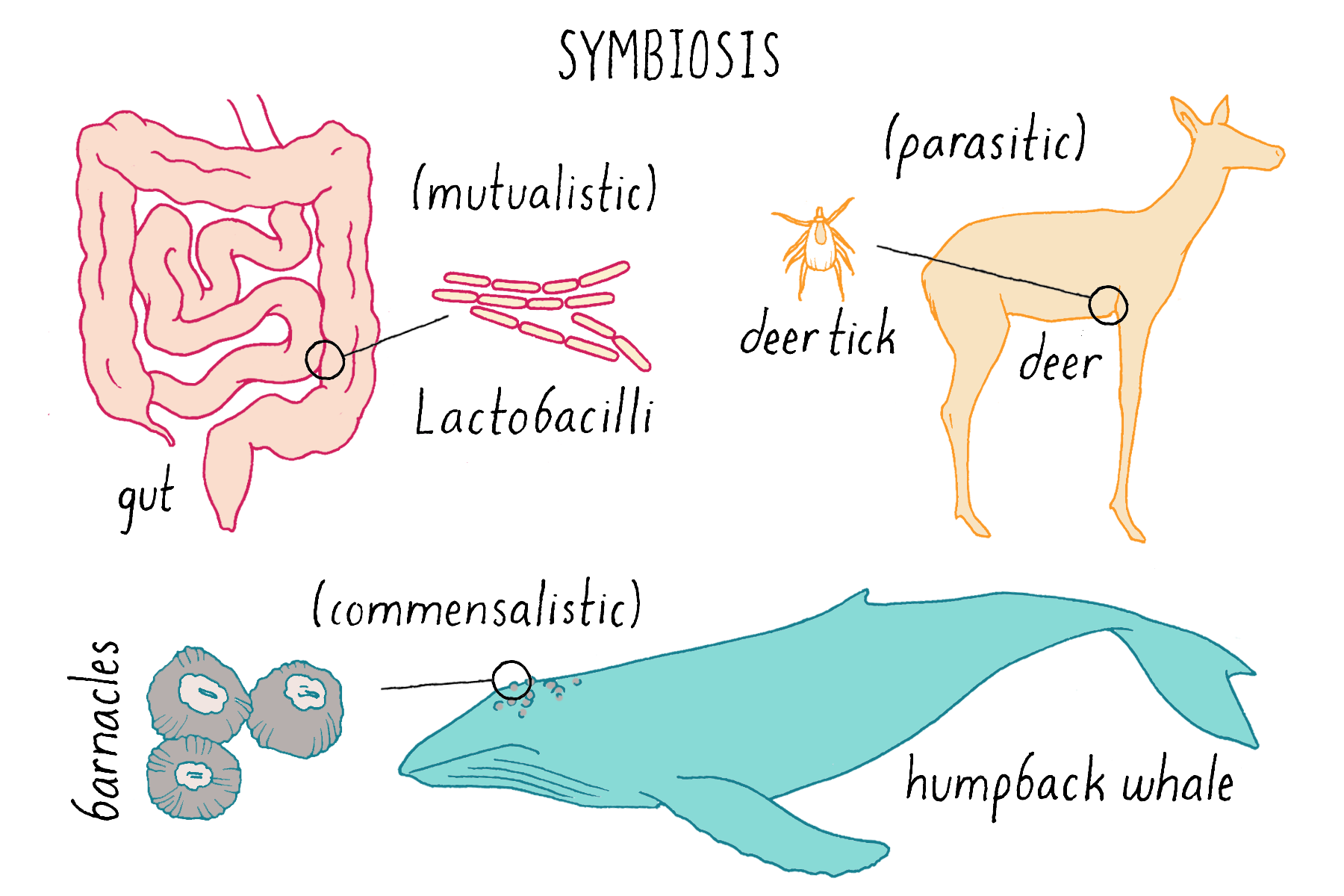
Various forms of symbiosis, or close interacting relationship between two different organisms.

Commensalism is a long-term biological interaction (symbiosis) in which members of one species gain benefits while those of the other species neither benefit nor are harmed. This is in contrast with mutualism, in which both organisms benefit from each other; amensalism, where one is harmed while the other is unaffected; and parasitism, where one is harmed and the other benefits.

The commensal (the species that benefits from the association) may obtain nutrients, shelter, support, or locomotion from the host species, which is substantially unaffected. The commensal relation is often between a larger host and a smaller commensal; the host organism is unmodified, whereas the commensal species may show great structural adaptation consistent with its habits, as in the remoras that ride attached to sharks and other fishes. Remoras feed on their hosts' fecal matter, while pilot fish feed on the leftovers of their hosts' meals. Numerous birds perch on bodies of large mammal herbivores or feed on the insects turned up by grazing mammals.

== Etymology ==
The word "commensalism" is derived from the word "commensal", meaning "eating at the same table" in human social interaction, which in turn comes through French from the Medieval Latin commensalis, meaning "sharing a table", from the prefix com-, meaning "together", and mensa, meaning "table" or "meal". Commensality, at the Universities of Oxford and Cambridge, refers to professors eating at the same table as students (as they live in the same "college").

The Belgian zoologist and paleontologist Pierre-Joseph van Beneden introduced the term "commensalism" in 1876.

== Examples of commensal relationships ==
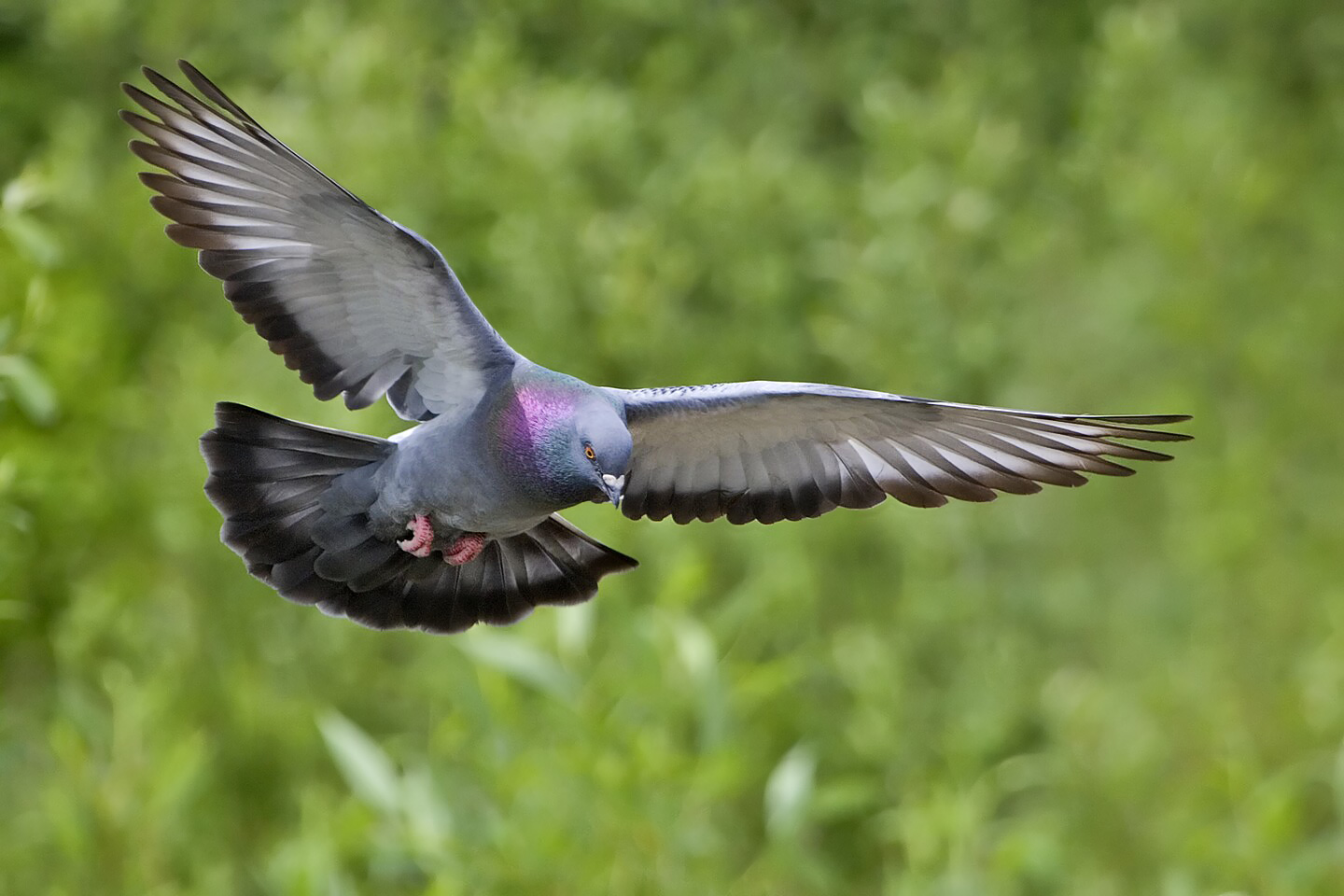
Domestic and feral pigeons (above) (Columba livia domestica) are commensals, having lived alongside humans for thousands of years after being domesticated from the rock dove (Columba livia). Due to its range being expanded with human assistance, the pigeon has a cosmopolitan distribution.

The commensal pathway was traversed by animals that fed on refuse around human habitats or by animals that preyed on other animals drawn to human camps. Those animals established a commensal relationship with humans in which the animals benefited but the humans received little benefit or harm. Those animals that were most capable of taking advantage of the resources associated with human camps would have been the 'tamer' individuals: less aggressive, with shorter fight-or-flight distances. Later, these animals developed closer social or economic bonds with humans and led to a domestic relationship.

The leap from a synanthropic population to a domestic one could only have taken place after the animals had progressed from anthropophily to habituation to commensalism and partnership, at which point the establishment of a reciprocal relationship between animal and human would have laid the foundation for domestication, including captivity and then human-controlled breeding. From this perspective, animal domestication is a coevolutionary process in which a population responds to selective pressure while adapting to a novel niche that includes another species with evolving behaviors.

=== Dogs and humans ===
The dog was the first domesticated animal and was domesticated and widely established across Eurasia before the end of the Pleistocene, well before the cultivation of crops or the domestication of other animals. The dog is often hypothesised to be a classic example of a domestic animal that likely traveled a commensal pathway into domestication. Archaeological evidence, such as the Bonn–Oberkassel dog dating to ~14,000 BP, supports the hypothesis that dog domestication preceded the emergence of agriculture and began close to the Last Glacial Maximum when hunter-gatherers preyed on megafauna.

The wolves more likely drawn to human camps were the less aggressive, subdominant pack members with lowered flight response, higher stress thresholds, and less wary around humans, and therefore better candidates for domestication. Proto-dogs might have taken advantage of carcasses left on site by early hunters, assisted in capturing prey, or provided defense from large competing predators at kills. However, the extent to which proto-domestic wolves could have become dependent on this way of life prior to domestication and without human provisioning is unclear and highly debated. In contrast, cats may have become fully dependent on a commensal lifestyle before being domesticated by preying on other commensal animals, such as rats and mice, without any human provisioning. The debate over the extent to which some wolves were commensal with humans before domestication stems from the debate over the level of human intentionality in domestication, which remains untested.

The earliest sign of domestication in dogs was the neotenization (retaining juvenile features into adulthood) of skull morphology and the shortening of snout length that results in tooth crowding, reduction in tooth size, and a reduction in the number of teeth, which has been attributed to the strong selection for reduced aggression. This process may have begun during the initial commensal stage of dog domestication, even before humans began to be active partners in the process.

A mitochondrial, microsatellite, and Y-chromosome assessment of two wolf populations in North America combined with satellite telemetry data revealed significant genetic and morphological differences between one population that migrated with and preyed upon caribou and another territorial ecotype population that remained in a boreal coniferous forest. Although these two populations spend a period of the year in the same place, and though there was evidence of gene flow between them, the difference in prey-habitat specialization has been sufficient to maintain genetic and even coloration divergence.

A different study has identified the remains of a population of extinct Pleistocene Beringian wolves with unique mitochondrial signatures. The skull shape, tooth wear, and isotopic signatures suggested these remains were derived from a population of specialist megafauna hunters and scavengers that became extinct while less specialized wolf ecotypes survived. Analogous to the modern wolf ecotype that has evolved to track and prey upon caribou, a Pleistocene wolf population could have begun following mobile hunter-gatherers, thus slowly acquiring genetic and phenotypic differences that would have allowed them to adapt to the human habitat more successfully.

=== Aspergillus and Staphylococcus ===
Numerous genera of bacteria and fungi live on and in the human body as part of its natural flora. The fungal genus Aspergillus is capable of living under considerable environmental stress, and thus is capable of colonising the upper gastrointestinal tract where relatively few examples of the body's gut flora can survive due to highly acidic or alkaline conditions produced by gastric acid and digestive juices. While Aspergillus normally produces no symptoms, in individuals who are immunocompromised or suffering from existing conditions such as tuberculosis, a condition called aspergillosis can occur, in which populations of Aspergillus grow out of control.

Staphylococcus aureus, a common bacterial species, is known best for its numerous pathogenic strains that can cause numerous illnesses and conditions. However, many strains of S. aureus are metabiotic commensals, and are present on roughly 20 to 30% of the human population as part of the skin flora. S. aureus also benefits from the variable ambient conditions created by the body's mucous membranes, and as such can be found in the oral and nasal cavities, as well as inside the ear canal. Other Staphylococcus species including S. warneri, S. lugdunensis and S. epidermidis, will also engage in commensalism for similar purposes.

=== Nitrosomonas spp and Nitrobacter spp ===
Commensalistic relationships between microorganisms include situations in which the waste product of one microorganism is a substrate for another species. One good example is nitrification — the oxidation of ammonium ion to nitrate. Nitrification occurs in two steps: first, bacteria such as Nitrosomonas spp. and certain crenarchaeotes oxidize ammonium to nitrite; and second, nitrite is oxidized to nitrate by Nitrobacter spp. and similar bacteria. Nitrobacter spp. benefit from their association with Nitrosomonas spp. because they use nitrite to obtain energy for growth.

Commensalistic associations also occur when one microbial group modifies the environment to make it better suited for another organism. The synthesis of acidic waste products during fermentation stimulates the proliferation of more acid-tolerant microorganisms, which may be only a minor part of the microbial community at neutral pH. An example of this process is the succession of microorganisms during milk spoilage.

Biofilm formation provides another example. The colonization of a newly exposed surface by one type of microorganism (an initial colonizer) makes it possible for other microorganisms to attach to the microbially modified surface.

=== Octocorals and brittle stars ===
In deep-sea, benthic environments there is an associative relationship between octocorals and brittle stars. Due to the currents flowing upward along seamount ridges, atop these ridges there are colonies of suspension feeding corals and sponges, and brittle stars that grip tight to them and get up off the sea floor. A specific documented commensal relationship is between the ophiuran Ophiocreas oedipus Lyman and the octocoral primnoid Metallogorgia melanotrichos.

Historically, commensalism has been recognized as the usual type of association between brittle stars and octocorals. In this association, the ophiurans benefit directly by being elevated through facilitating their feeding by suspension, while the octocorals do not seem to benefit or be harmed by this relationship.

Recent studies in the Gulf of Mexico have suggested that there are actually some benefits to the octocorals, such as receiving a cleaning action by the brittle star as it slowly moves around the coral. In some cases, a close relationship occurs between cohabiting species, with the interaction beginning from their juvenile stages.

== Arguments ==
Whether the relationship between humans and some types of gut flora is commensal or mutualistic is still unanswered.

Some biologists argue that any close interaction between two organisms is unlikely to be completely neutral for either party, and that relationships identified as commensal are likely mutualistic or parasitic in a subtle way that has not been detected. For example, epiphytes are "nutritional pirates" that may intercept substantial amounts of nutrients that would otherwise go to the host plant. Large numbers of epiphytes can also cause tree limbs to break or shade the host plant and reduce its rate of photosynthesis. Similarly, phoretic mites may hinder their host by making flight more difficult, which may affect its aerial hunting ability or cause it to expend extra energy while carrying these passengers.

== Types ==
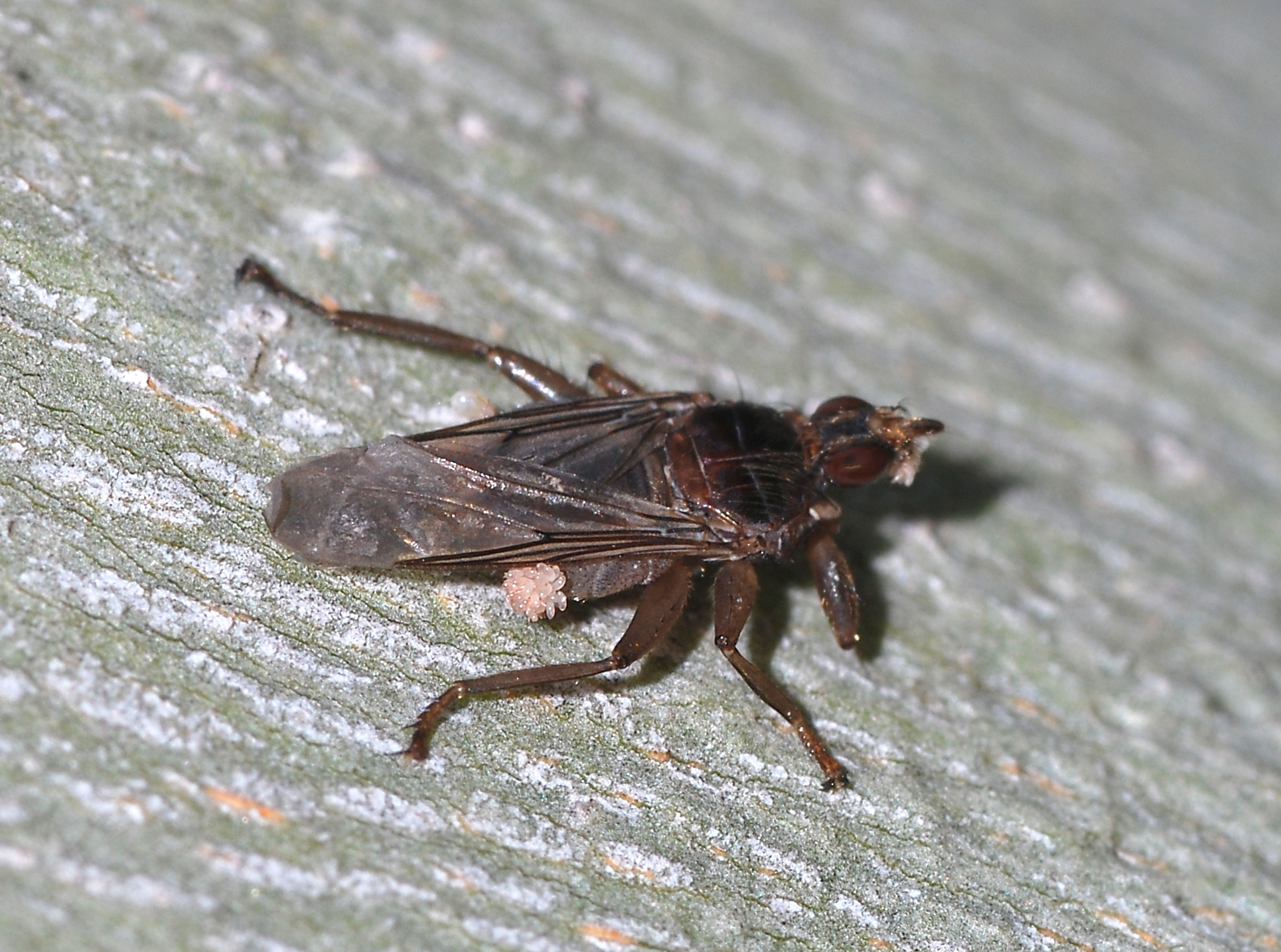
Phoretic mites on a fly (Pseudolynchia canariensis)

Like all ecological interactions, commensalisms vary in strength and duration from intimate, long-lived symbioses to brief, weak interactions through intermediaries.

=== Phoresy ===
Phoresy is one animal attached to another exclusively for transport, mainly arthropods, examples of which are mites on insects (such as beetles, flies or bees), pseudoscorpions on mammals or beetles, and millipedes on birds. Phoresy can be either obligate or facultative (induced by environmental conditions).

=== Inquilinism ===
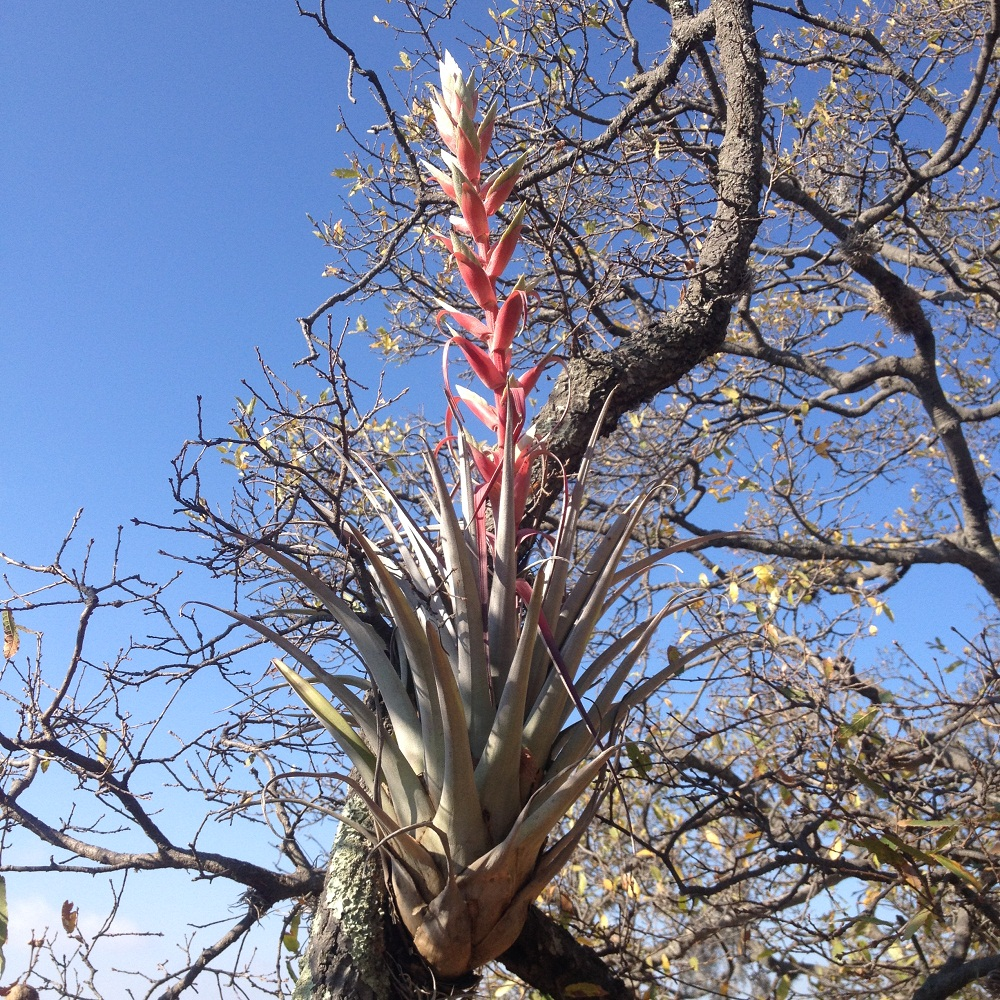
Inquilinism: Tillandsia bourgaei growing on an oak tree in Mexico

Inquilinism is the use of a second organism for permanent housing. Examples are epiphytic plants (such as many orchids) that grow on trees, or birds that live in holes in trees.

=== Metabiosis ===
Metabiosis is a more indirect dependency, in which one organism creates or prepares a suitable environment for a second. Examples include maggots, which develop on and infest corpses, and hermit crabs, which use gastropod shells to protect their bodies.

=== Facilitation ===
Facilitation or probiosis describes species interactions that benefit at least one of the participants and cause harm to neither.

=== Necromeny ===
Necromeny is one animal associating with another until the latter dies, then the former feeds on the corpse of the latter. Examples include some nematodes and some mites.

== See also ==
- Mutualism – where both organisms experience mutual benefit in the relationship
- Parasitism – where one organism benefits at the expense of another organism.
- Parabiosis – where both organisms occupy the same dwelling, but do not interfere with each other
- Symbiosis – long-term interactions between different biological species, which can be mutualistic, commensal or parasitic
- Synanthrope – species commensal with humans
