= Cauti =

Cauti may refer to:

- Catheter-associated urinary tract infection
- CAUTI (plant), the EPPO code of safflower
- Fernando Iwasaki Cauti, Peruvian writer and historian
