= Skin flora =

Microbiota that reside on the skin

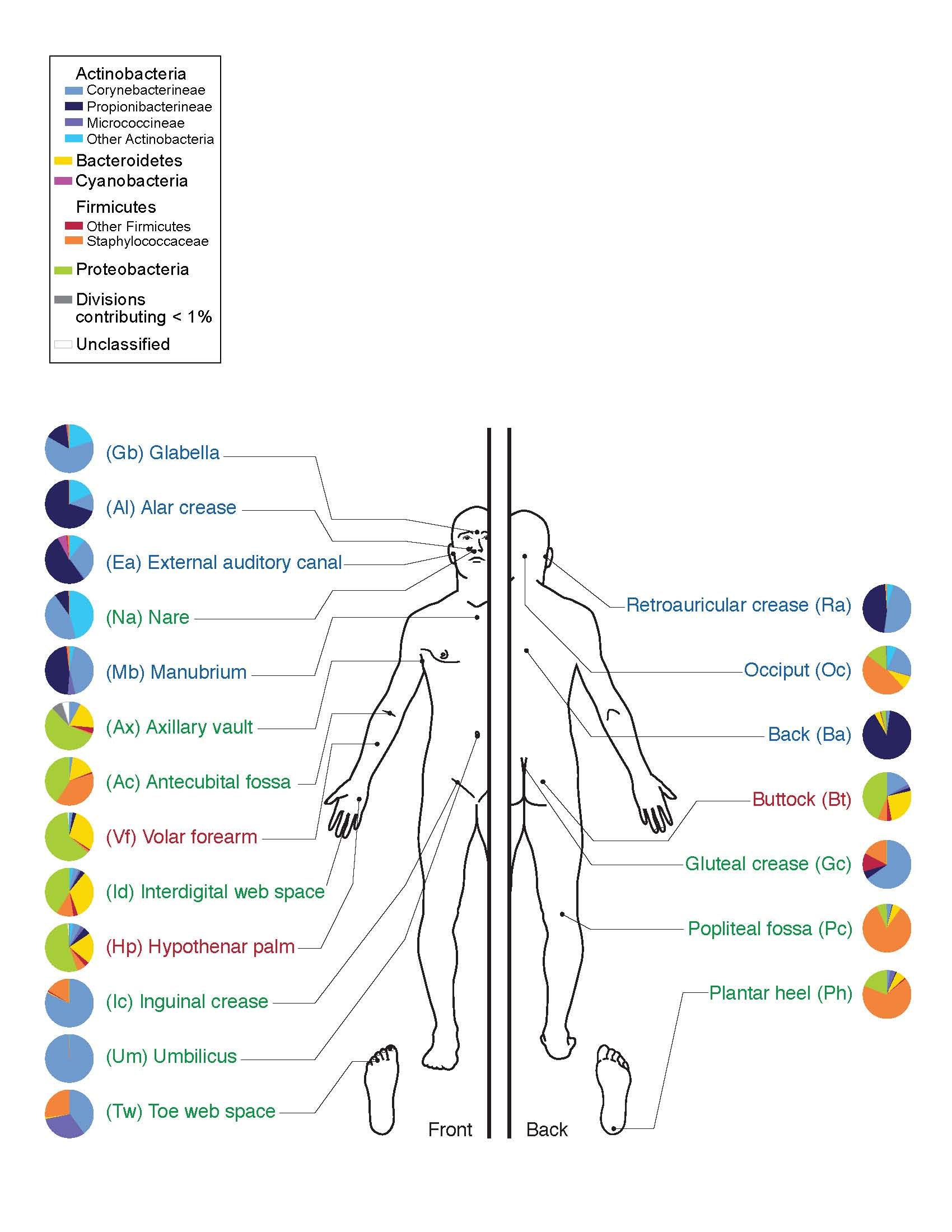
Depiction of the human body and bacteria that predominate

Skin flora, also called skin microbiota, refers to microbiota (communities of microorganisms) that reside on the skin, typically human skin. Many of them are bacteria of which there are around 1,000 species upon human skin from nineteen phyla. Most are found in the superficial layers of the epidermis and the upper parts of hair follicles.

Skin flora is usually non-pathogenic, and either commensal (are not harmful to their host) or mutualistic (offer a benefit). The benefits bacteria can offer include preventing transient pathogenic organisms from colonizing the skin surface, either by competing for nutrients, secreting chemicals against them, or stimulating the skin's immune system. However, resident microbes can cause skin diseases and enter the blood system, creating life-threatening diseases, particularly in immunosuppressed people.

A major non-human skin flora is Batrachochytrium dendrobatidis, a chytrid and non-hyphal zoosporic fungus that causes chytridiomycosis, an infectious disease thought to be responsible for the decline in amphibian populations.

== Species variety ==
=== Bacteria ===
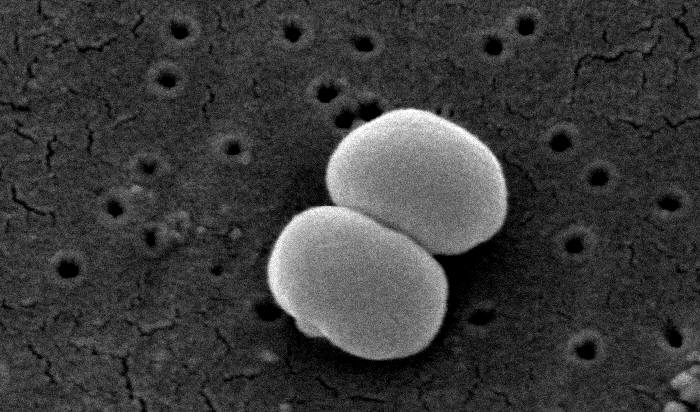
Scanning electron microscope image of Staphylococcus epidermidis, one of roughly a thousand bacteria species present on human skin. Though usually not pathogenic, it can cause skin infections and even life-threatening illnesses in those that are immunocompromised.

The estimate of the number of bacteria species present on skin has been radically changed by the use of 16S ribosomal RNA to identify bacterial species present on skin samples direct from their genetic material. Previously such identification had depended upon microbiological culture upon which many varieties of bacteria did not grow and so were hidden to science.

Staphylococcus epidermidis and Staphylococcus aureus were thought from cultural based research to be dominant. However 16S ribosomal RNA research finds that while common, these species make up only 5% of skin bacteria. However, skin variety provides a rich and diverse habitat for bacteria. Most come from four phyla: Actinomycetota (51.8%), Bacillota (24.4%), Pseudomonadota (16.5%), and Bacteroidota (6.3%).

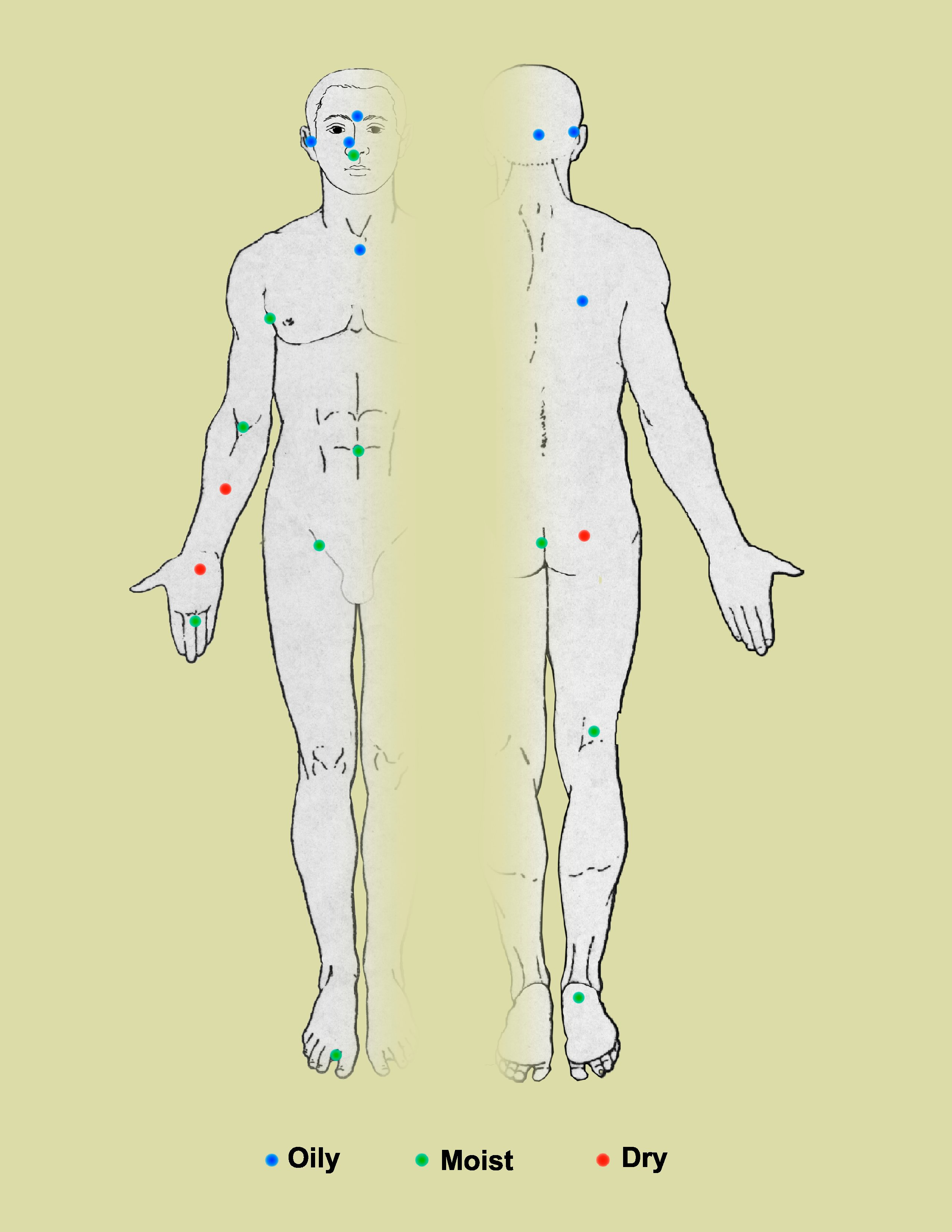
Ecology of the 20 sites on the skin studied in the Human Microbiome Project

There are three main ecological areas: sebaceous, moist, and dry. Propionibacteria and Staphylococci species were the main species in sebaceous areas. In moist places on the body Corynebacteria together with Staphylococci dominate. In dry areas, there is a mixture of species but Betaproteobacteria and Flavobacteriales are dominant. Ecologically, sebaceous areas had greater species richness than moist and dry ones. The areas with least similarity between people in species were the spaces between fingers, the spaces between toes, axillae, and umbilical cord stump. Most similarly were beside the nostril, nares (inside the nostril), and on the back.

Frequency of the best studied skin microbes
Organism	Observations	Pathogenicity
Staphylococcus epidermidis	Common	occasionally pathogenic
Staphylococcus aureus	Infrequent	usually pathogenic
Staphylococcus warneri	Infrequent	occasionally pathogenic
Streptococcus pyogenes	Infrequent	usually pathogenic
Streptococcus mitis	Frequent	occasionally pathogenic
Cutibacterium acnes	Frequent	occasionally pathogenic
Corynebacterium spp.	Frequent	occasionally pathogenic
Acinetobacter johnsonii	Frequent	occasionally pathogenic
Pseudomonas aeruginosa	Infrequent	occasionally pathogenic

=== Fungal ===
A study of the area between toes in 100 young adults found 14 different genera of fungi. These include yeasts such as Candida albicans, Rhodotorula rubra, Torulopsis and Trichosporon cutaneum, dermatophytes (skin living fungi) such as Microsporum gypseum, and Trichophyton rubrum and nondermatophyte fungi (opportunistic fungi that can live in skin) such as Rhizopus stolonifer, Trichosporon cutaneum, Fusarium, Scopulariopsis brevicaulis, Curvularia, Alternaria alternata, Paecilomyces, Aspergillus flavus and Penicillium species.

A study by the National Human Genome Research Institute in Bethesda, Maryland, researched the DNA of human skin fungi at 14 different locations on the body. These were the ear canal, between the eyebrows, the back of the head, behind the ear, the heel, toenails, between the toes, forearm, back, groin, nostrils, chest, palm, and the crook of the elbow. The study showed a large fungal diversity across the body, the richest habitat being the heel, which hosts about 80 species of fungi. By way of contrast, there are some 60 species in toenail clippings and 40 between the toes. Other rich areas are the palm, forearm and inside the elbow, with from 18 to 32 species. The head and the trunk hosted between 2 and 10 each.

==== Umbilical microbiome ====
The umbilicus, or navel, is an area of the body that is rarely exposed to UV light, soaps, or bodily secretions (the navel does not produce any secretions or oils) and because it is an almost undisturbed community of bacteria it is an excellent part of the skin microbiome to study. The navel, or umbilicus is a moist microbiome of the body (with high humidity and temperatures), that contains a large amount of bacteria, especially bacteria that favors moist conditions such as Corynebacterium and Staphylococcus.

The Belly Button Biodiversity Project began at North Carolina State University in early 2011 with two initial groups of 35 and 25 volunteers. Volunteers were given sterile cotton swabs and were asked to insert the cotton swabs into their navels, to turn the cotton swab around three times and then return the cotton swab to the researchers in a vial that contained a 0.5 ml 10% phosphate saline buffer. Researchers at North Carolina State University, led by Jiri Hulcr, then grew the samples in a culture until the bacterial colonies were large enough to be photographed and then these pictures were posted on the Belly Button Biodiversity Project's website (volunteers were given sample numbers so that they could view their own samples online). These samples then were analyzed using 16S rDNA libraries so that strains that did not grow well in cultures could be identified.

The researchers at North Carolina State University discovered that while it was difficult to predict every strain of bacteria in the microbiome of the navel that they could predict which strains would be prevalent and which strains of bacteria would be quite rare in the microbiome. It was found that the navel microbiomes only contained a few prevalent types of bacteria (Staphylococcus, Corynebacterium, Actinobacteria, Clostridiales, and Bacilli) and many different types of rare bacteria. Other types of rare organisms were discovered inside the navels of the volunteers including three types of Archaea, two of which were found in one volunteer who claimed not to have bathed or showered for many years.

Staphylococcus and Corynebacterium were among the most common types of bacteria found in the navels of this project's volunteers and these types of bacteria have been found to be the most common types of bacteria found on the human skin in larger studies of the skin microbiome (of which the Belly Button Biodiversity Project is a part). (In these larger studies it has been found that females generally have more Staphylococcus living in their skin microbiomes (usually Staphylococcus epidermidis) and that males have more Corynebacterium living in their skin microbiomes.)

According to the Belly Button Biodiversity Project at North Carolina State University, there are two types of microorganisms found in the navel and surrounding areas. Transient bacteria (bacteria that does not reproduce) forms the majority of the organisms found in the navel, and an estimated 1400 various strains were found in 95% of participants of the study.

The Belly Button Biodiversity Project is ongoing and has now taken swabs from over 500 people. The project was designed with the aim of countering that misconception that bacteria are always harmful to humans and that humans are at war with bacteria. In actuality, most strains of bacteria are harmless if not beneficial for the human body. Another of the project's goals is to foster public interest in microbiology. Working in concert with the Human Microbiome Project, the Belly Button Biodiversity Project also studies the connections between human microbiomes and the factors of age, sex, ethnicity, location and overall health.

== Relationship to host ==
Skin microflora can be commensals, mutualistic or pathogens. Often they can be all three depending upon the strength of the person's immune system. Research upon the immune system in the gut and lungs has shown that microflora aids immunity development: however such research has only started upon whether this is the case with the skin. Pseudomonas aeruginosa is an example of a mutualistic bacterium that can turn into a pathogen and cause disease: if it gains entry into the circulatory system it can result in infections in bone, joint, gastrointestinal, and respiratory systems. It can also cause dermatitis. However, P. aeruginosa produces antimicrobial substances such as pseudomonic acid (that are exploited commercially such as Mupirocin). This works against staphylococcal and streptococcal infections. P. aeruginosa also produces substances that inhibit the growth of fungus species such as Candida krusei, Candida albicans, Torulopsis glabrata, Saccharomyces cerevisiae and Aspergillus fumigatus. It can also inhibit the growth of Helicobacter pylori. So important is its antimicrobial actions that it has been noted that "removing P. aeruginosa from the skin, through use of oral or topical antibiotics, may inversely allow for aberrant yeast colonization and infection."

Another aspect of bacteria is the generation of body odor. Sweat is odorless however several bacteria may consume it and create byproducts which may be considered putrid by humans (as in contrast to flies, for example, that may find them attractive/appealing). Several examples are:

- Propionibacteria in adolescent and adult sebaceous glands can turn its amino acids into propionic acid.
- Staphylococcus epidermidis creates body odor by breaking sweat into isovaleric acid (3-methyl butanoic acid).
- Bacillus subtilis creates strong foot odor.

== Skin defenses ==
=== Antimicrobial peptides ===
The skin creates antimicrobial peptides such as cathelicidins that control the proliferation of skin microbes. Cathelicidins not only reduce microbe numbers directly but also cause the secretion of cytokine release which induces inflammation, angiogenesis, and reepithelialization. Conditions such as atopic dermatitis have been linked to the suppression in cathelicidin production. In rosacea abnormal processing of cathelicidin cause inflammation. Psoriasis has been linked to self-DNA created from cathelicidin peptides that causes autoinflammation. A major factor controlling cathelicidin is vitamin D_{3}.

=== Acidity ===
The superficial layers of the skin are naturally acidic (pH 4–4.5) due to lactic acid in sweat and produced by skin bacteria. At this pH mutualistic flora such as Staphylococci, Micrococci, Corynebacterium and Propionibacteria grow but not transient bacteria such as Gram-negative bacteria like Escherichia and Pseudomonas or Gram positive ones such as Staphylococcus aureus. Another factor affecting the growth of pathological bacteria is that the antimicrobial substances secreted by the skin are enhanced in acidic conditions. In alkaline conditions, bacteria cease to be attached to the skin and are more readily shed. It has been observed that the skin also swells under alkaline conditions and opens up allowing bacterial movement to the surface.

=== Immune system ===
If activated, the immune system in the skin produces cell-mediated immunity against microbes such as dermatophytes (skin fungi). One reaction is to increase stratum corneum turnover and so shed the fungus from the skin surface. Skin fungi such as Trichophyton rubrum have evolved to create substances that limit the immune response to them. The shedding of skin is a general means to control the buildup of flora upon the skin surface.

== Skin diseases ==
Microorganisms play a role in noninfectious skin diseases such as atopic dermatitis, rosacea, psoriasis, and acne Damaged skin can cause nonpathogenic bacteria to become pathogenic. The diversity of species on the skin is related to later development of dermatitis.

=== Acne vulgaris ===
Acne vulgaris is a common skin condition characterised by excessive sebum production by the pilosebaceous unit and inflammation of the skin. Affected areas are typically colonised by Cutibacterium acnes; a member of the commensal microbiota even in those without acne. High populations of C. acnes are linked to acne vulgaris although only certain strains are strongly associated with acne while others with healthy skin. The relative population of C. acnes is similar between those with acne and those without.

Current treatment includes topical and systemic antibacterial drugs which result in decreased C. acnes colonisation and/or activity. Potential probiotic treatment includes the use of Staphylococcus epidermidis to inhibit C. acnes growth. S. epidermidis produces succinic acid which has been shown to inhibit C. acnes growth. Lactobacillus plantarum has also been shown to act as an anti-inflammatory and improve antimicrobial properties of the skin when applied topically. It was also shown to be effective in reducing acne lesion size.

=== Atopic dermatitis ===
Individuals with atopic dermatitis have shown an increase in populations of Staphylococcus aureus in both lesional and nonlesional skin. Atopic dermatitis flares are associated with low bacterial diversity due to colonisation by S. aureus and following standard treatment, bacterial diversity has been seen to increase.

Current treatments include combinations of topical or systemic antibiotics, corticosteroids, and diluted bleach baths. Potential probiotic treatments include using the commensal skin bacteria, S. epidermidis, to inhibit S. aureus growth. During atopic dermatitis flares, population levels of S. epidermidis has been shown to increase as an attempt to control S. aureus populations. Research supported by private companies, such as Codex Labs has examined microbiome-based methods for restoring the skin barrier, including formulations designed to support balanced skin flora in atopic dermatitis. Regular use of moisturisers (emollients) helps maintain skin hydration and barrier integrity, which may reduce irritation, allergen penetration, and disease flares. Various emollient types, such as lotions, creams, and ointments, are similarly effective, with choice guided by individual preference and skin condition.

Low gut microbial diversity in babies has been associated with an increased risk of atopic dermatitis. Infants with atopic eczema have low levels of Bacteroides and high levels of Bacillota. Bacteroides have anti-inflammatory properties which are essential against dermatitis. (See gut microbiota)

=== Psoriasis vulgaris ===
Psoriasis vulgaris typically affects drier skin sites such as elbows and knees. Dry areas of the skin tend to have high microbial diversity and fewer populations than sebaceous sites. A study using swab sampling techniques show areas rich in Bacillota (mainly Streptococcus and Staphylococcus) and Actinomycetota (mainly Corynebacterium and Propionibacterium) are associated with psoriasis. While another study using biopsies associate increased levels of Bacillota and Actinomycetota with healthy skin. However most studies show that individuals affected by psoriasis have a lower microbial diversity in the affected areas.

Treatments for psoriasis include topical agents, phototherapy, and systemic agents. Current research on the skin microbiota's role in psoriasis is inconsistent therefore there are no potential probiotic treatments.

=== Rosacea ===
Rosacea is typically connected to sebaceous sites of the skin. The skin mite Demodex folliculorum produce lipases that allow them to use sebum as a source of food therefore they have a high affinity for sebaceous skin sites. Although it is a part of the commensal skin microbiota, patients affected with rosacea show an increase in D. folliculorum compared to healthy individuals, suggesting pathogenicity.

Bacillus oleronius, a Demodex associated microbe, is not typically found in the commensal skin microbiota but initiates inflammatory pathways whose starting mechanism is similar to rosacea patients. Populations of S. epidermidis have also been isolated from pustules of rosacea patients. However it is possible that they were moved by Demodex to areas that favour growth as Demodex has shown to transport bacteria around the face.

Current treatments include topical and oral antibiotics and laser therapy. As current research has yet to show a clear mechanism for Demodex influence in rosacea, there are no potential probiotic treatments.

== Clinical ==
=== Infected devices ===
Skin microbes are a potential source of infected medical devices such as catheters.

== Hygiene ==
The human skin is host to numerous bacterial and fungal species, some of which are known to be harmful, some known to be beneficial and the vast majority unresearched. The use of bactericidal and fungicidal soaps will inevitably lead to bacterial and fungal populations which are resistant to the chemicals employed (see drug resistance).

=== Contagion ===
Skin flora do not readily pass between people: 30 seconds of moderate friction and dry hand contact results in a transfer of only 0.07% of natural hand flora from naked with a greater percentage from gloves.

=== Removal ===
The most effective (60–80% reduction) antimicrobial washing is with ethanol, isopropanol, and n-propanol. Viruses are most affected by high (95%) concentrations of ethanol, while bacteria are more affected by n-propanol.

Unmedicated soaps are not very effective as illustrated by the following data. Health care workers washed their hands once in nonmedicated liquid soap for 30 seconds. The students/technicians for 20 times.

Skin flora upon two hospital groups in colony-forming units per ml.
group and hand skin condition	unwashed	washed
Health care workers healthy	3.47	3.15
Health care workers damaged	3.33	3.29
Students/technicians healthy	4.39	3.54
Students/technicians damaged	4.58	4.43

An important use of hand washing is to prevent the transmission of antibiotic resistant skin flora that cause hospital-acquired infections such as methicillin-resistant Staphylococcus aureus. While such flora have become antibiotic resistant due to antibiotics there is no evidence that recommended antiseptics or disinfectants selects for antibiotic-resistant organisms when used in hand washing. However, many strains of organisms are resistant to some of the substances used in antibacterial soaps such as triclosan.

One study of bar soaps in dentist clinics found they all had their own flora and on average from two to five different genera of microorganisms with those used most more likely to have more species varieties. Another study of bar soaps in public toilets found even more flora. Another study found that very dry soaps are not colonized while all are that rest in pools of water. However, one experiment using soaps inoculated with Pseudomonas aeruginosa and Escherichia coli that washing with inoculated bar soap did not transmit these bacteria to participants hands.

=== Damaged skin ===
Washing skin repeatedly can damage the protective external layer and cause transepidermal loss of water. This can be seen in roughness characterized by scaling and dryness, itchiness, dermatitis provoked by microorganisms and allergens penetrating the corneal layer and redness. Wearing gloves can cause further problems since it produces a humid environment favoring the growth of microbes and also contains irritants such as latex and talcum powder.

Hand washing can damage skin because the stratum corneum top layer of skin consists of 15 to 20 layers of keratin disks, corneocytes, each of which is each surrounded by a thin film of skin lipids which can be removed by alcohols and detergents.

Damaged skin defined by extensive cracking of skin surface, widespread reddening or occasional bleeding has also been found to be more frequently colonized by Staphylococcus hominis and these were more likely to be methicillin resistant. Though not related to greater antibiotic resistance, damaged skin was also more like to be colonized by Staphylococcus aureus, gram-negative bacteria, Enterococci and Candida.

== Comparison with other flora ==
The skin flora is different from that of the gut which is predominantly Bacillota and Bacteroidota. There is also low level of variation between people that is not found in gut studies. Both gut and skin flora however lack the diversity found in soil flora.

== See also ==
- Bacterial disease
- Body odor
- Gut flora
- Human flora
- Human Microbiome Project
- Medical microbiology
- Microbial ecology
- Microflora
- Oral microbiology
- Skin
- Vaginal flora
