= FAT TOM =

Mnemonic device in the food service industry

Fat Tom is a mnemonic device used in the food service industry to describe the six favorable conditions required for the growth of foodborne pathogens. It is an acronym for food, acidity, time, temperature, oxygen and moisture.

== Conditions ==
Each of the six conditions that foster the growth foodborne pathogens are defined in set ranges:

F	Food	There are sufficient nutrients available that promote the growth of microorganisms. Protein-rich foods, such as meat, milk, eggs and fish are most susceptible.
A	Acidity	Foodborne pathogens require a slightly acidic pH level of 4.6–7.5, while they thrive in conditions with a pH of 6.6–7.5. The United States Food and Drug Administration's (FDA) regulations for acid/acidified foods require that the food be brought to pH 4.5 or below.
T	Time	Food should be removed from "the danger zone" (see below) within two-four hours, either by cooling or heating. While most guidelines state two hours, a few indicate four hours is still safe.
T	Temperature	Foodborne pathogens grow best in temperatures between 41 and 135 °F (5 and 57 °C), a range referred to as the temperature danger zone (TDZ). They thrive in temperatures that are between 70 and 104 °F (21 and 40 °C).
O	Oxygen	Almost all foodborne pathogens are aerobic, that is requiring oxygen to grow. Some pathogens, such as Clostridium botulinum, the source of botulism, are anaerobic.
M	Moisture	Water is essential for the growth of foodborne pathogens. Water activity (a_{w}) is a measure of the water available for use and is measured on a scale of 0 to 1.0. Foodborne pathogens grow best in foods that have a_{w} between 0.95 and 1.0. FDA regulations for canned foods require a_{w} of 0.85 or below.

== See also ==
- HACCP
- Sanitation Standard Operating Procedures
