= Intubation =

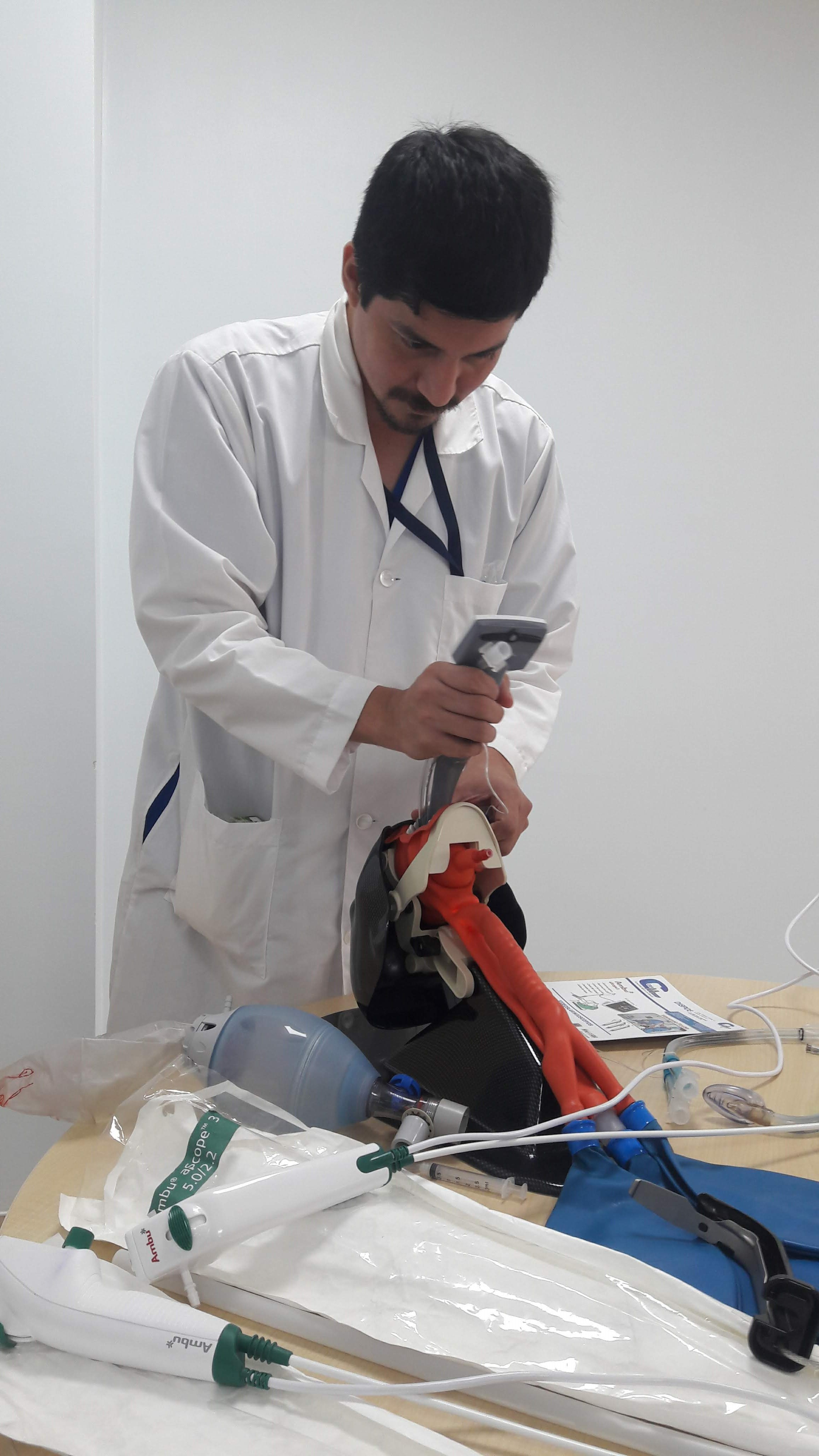
- ICD-9-CM: 96.0
- MeSH: D007440

Intubation (sometimes entubation) is a medical procedure involving the insertion of a tube into the body. Most commonly, intubation refers to tracheal intubation, a procedure during which an endotracheal tube is inserted into the trachea to support patient ventilation. Other examples of intubation include balloon tamponade using a Sengstaken–Blakemore tube (a tube into the gastrointestinal tract), urinary catheterization, and nasogastric intubation using a feeding tube.

== Types and corresponding indications ==
=== Tracheal intubation ===
Tracheal intubation is a procedure involving the placement of an endotracheal tube into a patient's windpipe, also known as the trachea. This procedure may be done to treat either emergency or non-emergency conditions. Examples of emergency conditions include airway compromise, respiratory failure, allergic reactions, and trauma. An example of a non-emergency condition where tracheal intubation is performed includes surgery, during which an individual may not be able to breathe on their own as a result of anesthetic medications.

=== Nasogastric intubation ===
Nasogastric intubation occurs when a nasogastric tube is placed. This procedure may be used to treat conditions that prevent the regular passage of food through the mouth to the rest of the GI system. Conditions where the passage of normal GI contents may be interrupted includes head and neck cancers, bowel obstruction, and conditions that cause difficulty swallowing (also known as dysphagia). Nasogastric intubation may also be used to treat malnutrition, poisoning, upper GI bleeding, surgery, and to administer medications.

=== Urinary catheterization ===
Urinary intubation via a catheter is often used to help relieve obstructions to the passage of urine. Obstructions can be caused by a variety of conditions, including urinary incontinence, prostate enlargement, or tumors. Catheterization can also be done to relieve urinary retention caused by infections, trauma, or medications. Catheterization may also be performed during surgery or to administer medications directly to the bladder.

== Technique ==
=== Tracheal intubation ===
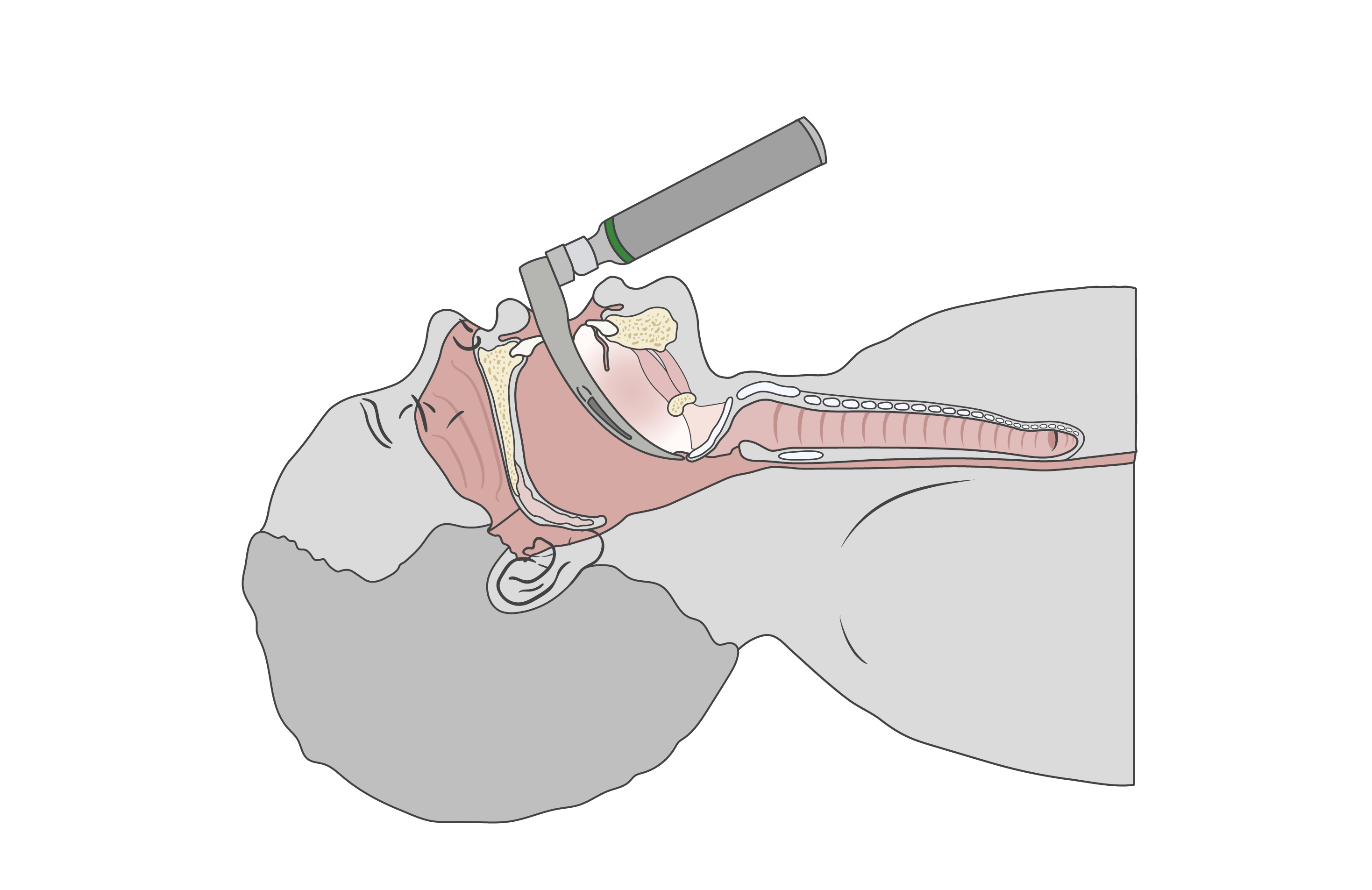
Sagittal view of anatomy of patient during tracheal intubation

Tracheal intubation involves the placement of a tube, known as an endotracheal tube, into the mouth or nose. Intubation first begins with the use of anesthesia medications, usually delivered through an IV, to place the patient to sleep. Extra oxygen is subsequently administered to the patient through a face mask. Once the patient is asleep, an anesthesia provider will tilt the patient's head back and insert a viewing device, also known as a laryngoscope, into the patient's mouth. The laryngoscope is accompanied by a dull blade to help move other oral structures, such as the tongue, out of the way. Once the anesthesia provider identifies the epiglottis, which covers the larynx, the tissue is manually lifted using the laryngoscope. The endotracheal tube is inserted through the larynx past the vocal cords and is secured by inflating a small balloon at its extremity. Once secured, the laryngoscope is removed. The tube is then secured at the mouth, often using tape or with a strap that wraps around the patient's head. Finally, correct placement is verified by listening to both lungs for breath sounds.

=== Nasogastric tube ===
Prior to placing a nasogastric tube, the first step of the process involves measuring the correct length needed so that the tube reaches the stomach. The most commonly used method worldwide involves measuring the distance of the tube from the tip of the nose to the patient's earlobe to the xiphoid. The first few inches of the tube is then lubricated to facilitate placement. Some providers may also use a lidocaine spray to help numb the sinus cavity and throat. The tube is subsequently inserted through the nostril and advanced to the back of the throat. The patient is then instructed to take small sips of water as the tube is advanced through the esophagus. Once the nasogastric tube is inserted at the correct length, as determined previously, the tube is secured via tape. Verification of correct placement most commonly involves the use of a chest X-ray, where the end tip of the tube can be seen in the stomach.

=== Urinary catheterization ===
One of the most common forms of urinary catheterization is known as Foley catheterization. During this procedure, a healthcare provider begins by sterilizing the genital area. An anesthetic gel may then be applied to ease discomfort. The Foley catheter is then lubricated with gel before being inserted into the urethra. Upon advancement into the bladder, a small balloon located toward the tip of the catheter is inflated to secure it into place. Lastly, the Foley catheter and bag are secured to the patient's leg.

== Complications ==
Each type of intubation may be associated with different complications and/or risks. Common complications include infection, particularly with urinary catheterization, as well as those associated with misplacement.

=== Infection ===
Catheter-associated urinary tract infections, or CAUTIs, are infections of the urinary tract that occur as a result of urinary catheter use. CAUTIs occur when bacteria travel up the catheter tubing and spread to the rest of the urinary tract. Risk factors for developing a CAUTI include prolonged catheter use, improper hand hygiene, and lack of aseptic insertion technique. Complications resulting from CAUTIs include increased morbidity and mortality, as well as longer hospital stays. Risk of infection is also associated with tracheal intubation. Ventilator-associated pneumonia, or VAP, is a type of pneumonia that occurs in patients who have been intubated and mechanically ventilated for more than 48 hours. A procedure to create a small opening directly into the trachea, or a tracheostomy, is often performed if prolonged intubation is expected to reduce the risk of contracting VAP.

=== Misplaced intubation ===
A separate complication that may occur includes a misplaced intubation. Specifically, if the measured length of the NG tube is too long, the tube may coil in the stomach, causing the tip to enter the esophagus or the duodenum. On the other hand, if the tube is measured too short, the tip of the NG tube may only reach the esophagus. Due to how close the esophagus is located to the trachea, NG tube placement in the esophagus can be a risk factor for aspiration. As a result, an abdominal X-ray is often performed following NG tube placement to confirm proper placement.

Similarly, placement of an endotracheal tube too far down may result in intubation of one lung as opposed to both lungs, also known as endobronchial intubation. This may be identified on physical exam with unilaterally present breath sounds, with lung sounds only being heard in the ventilated lung. Unintentional ventilation of a single lung can lead to insufficient ventilation and oxygenation. Additionally, due to how close the trachea is to the esophagus, the endotracheal tube may inadvertently be placed in the esophagus instead of the trachea during intubation, resulting in the accidental ventilation of the stomach. This can be identified through the absence of bilateral breath sounds on physical exam during mechanical ventilation. Thus, capnography is frequently used to confirm placement of an endotracheal tube in the trachea, as opposed to the esophagus.

== See also ==
- Catheterization
- Nasogastric intubation
- Tracheal intubation
