= SSOP =

SSOP may refer to:

- Sanitation Standard Operating Procedures
- Shrink Small-Outline Package
- Supreme state organ of power
