= Staphylococcus hominis =

Scientific classification
- Domain: Bacteria
- Kingdom: Bacillati
- Phylum: Bacillota
- Class: Bacilli
- Order: Bacillales
- Family: Staphylococcaceae
- Genus: Staphylococcus
- Species: S. hominis

Binomial name
- Staphylococcus hominis Kloos & Schleifer 1975

Species of bacterium

Staphylococcus hominis is a coagulase-negative member of the bacterial genus Staphylococcus, consisting of Gram-positive, spherical cells in clusters. It occurs very commonly as a generally harmless commensal on human and animal skin and is known for producing thioalcohol compounds that contribute to body odour. Like many other coagulase-negative staphylococci, S. hominis may occasionally cause infection in patients whose immune systems are compromised, for example by chemotherapy or predisposing illness.

== Description ==
Colonies of S. hominis are small, usually 1–2 mm in diameter after 24 hours' incubation at 35 °C, and white or tan in colour. Occasionally, strains are resistant to novobiocin and may be confused with other resistant species (e.g. S. saprophyticus).

It is one of only two species of Staphylococcus to display sensitivity to desferrioxamine, the other being S. epidermidis. Unlike S. epidermidis, S. hominis produces acid from trehalose, so the two tests together serve to identify the species.

== Biology ==
Numerous coagulase-negative staphylococci appear commonly on human skin. Of these species, S. epidermidis and S. hominis are the most abundant. While S. epidermidis tends to colonize the upper part of the body, S. hominis tends to colonize in areas with numerous apocrine glands, such as axillae and the pubic region. In a certain study, S. hominis was calculated to account for 22% of the total staphylococcal species recovered from individuals, second to S. epidermidis at 46%. S. hominis is the predominant species on the head, axillae, arms, and legs.

S. hominis, as well as most other staphylococcal species common on the human skin, is able to produce acid aerobically from glucose, fructose, sucrose, trehalose, and glycerol. Some strains were also able to produce acid from turanose, lactose, galactose, melezitose, mannitol, and mannose. Most strains colonize on the skin for relatively short periods of time compared to other Staphylococcus species. They, on average, stay on the skin for only several weeks or months.

The cell wall contains low amounts of teichoic acid and glutamic acid. The cell wall teichoic acid contains glycerol and glucosamine.

S. hominis cells are Gram-positive cocci, usually 1.2 to 1.4 μm in diameter. They appear normally in tetrads and sometimes in pairs.

=== Resistance ===
Based on a total of 240 strains, all were resistant to lysozyme, some were slightly resistant to lysostaphin, 77% were susceptible to penicillin G, 97% to streptomycin, 93% to erythromycin, 64% to tetracycline, and 99% to novobiocin.

Multi drug resistant strains of s. hominis have been isolated from blood and wound cultures in humans.

== Culturing ==
When grown in agar cultures, colonies are usually circular, 4.0 to 4.5 mm in diameter. Agar colonies usually have wide edges and an elevated center. They are commonly smooth with dull surfaces, and are yellow-orange pigmented in the center of the opaque colonies. They grow both in aerobic and anaerobic conditions, but tend to grow significantly less in the latter. Optimal NaCl concentrations of the agar culture for the growth of S. hominis seem to be around 7.5%, and a salt concentration of 15% yielded poor growth to no growth at all. The optimal growth temperature range was around 28 to 40 °C, but good growth is still observed at 45 °C, while no growth is observed at 15 °C.

S. hominis can be differentiated from staphylococci by its colony morphology and pigmentation patterns, predominant tetrad cell arrangement, poor growth in thioglycolate, low tolerance of NaCl, and carbohydrate reaction pattern. Each species is also significantly different in cell wall composition, lactic acid configuration, temperature extremes of growth, coagulase activity, hemolysis acetylmethylcarbinol production, nitrate reduction, and phosphatase, DNase, and bacteriolytic activities. Similarities in these properties between S. hominis and several other species suggest a close relationship between S. hominis and S. epidermidis, S. haemolyticus, and S. warneri.

== Antibiotic-resistant subspecies ==
Staphylococcus hominis is normally found on human skin and is usually harmless, but can sometimes cause infections in people with abnormally weak immune systems. Most, if not all, strains are susceptible to penicillin, erythromycin, and novobiocin, but a divergent strain, S. hominis subsp. novobiosepticus (SHN), was isolated between 1989 and 1996.

This strain was named so because of its unique resistance to novobiocin and its failure to produce acid aerobically from trehalose and glucosamine. In addition, the 26 isolated strains of this new subspecies are resistant to nalidixic acid, penicillin G, oxacillin, kanamycin, and streptomycin. They were also somewhat resistant to methicillin and gentamicin, and most strains were resistant to erythromycin, clindamycin, chloramphenicol, trimethoprim/sulfamethoxazole, and ciprofloxacin, as well. In addition, S. hominis hominis is commonly found isolated from human skin, but as of 1998, no SHN isolate from human skin had been reported.

The SHN is so similar to the original S. hominis, now called S. hominis subsp. hominis, that in 2010, a MicroScan system that clinical microbiology laboratories used, identified 7 of 31 S. hominis novobiosepticus cultures as S. hominis hominis. The relationship between the two was unknown, but antibiotic-resistant isolates of S. hominis belonged only to SHN.

SHN strains seems to have thickened cell walls, which can be the result of a genetic background that also allows for vancomycin resistance. The thickened cell walls exist in subspecies with and without vancomycin resistance which suggests this subspecies did not originate from the acquiring of resistance genes.

=== Origin ===
The combined resistance to novobiocin and oxacillin is hypothesized to have originated from a simultaneous introduction of genes controlling the resistance to the two. These genes were believed to have been acquired originally through heterologous DNA from a methicillin-resistant strain of one of the novobiocin-resistant species belonging to the S. sciuri or the S. saprophyticus groups. The larger genome size of the SHN compared to that of S. hominis hominis may be the result of the acquiring of heterologous DNA. This new, divergent strain was first described in 1998, and was first implicated in causing bacteremia in 2002.

Another hypothesis is the insertion of the mec A gene and its flanking sequence into the chromosome of SHN might have affected the expression of a closely linked gene, which converted the host to become novobiocin-resistant.

=== Recent cases ===
In 2002 and 2003, 32 isolates of SHN were found in 21 patients. Twenty-three of these were from blood cultures, six from catheters, one from cerebrospinal fluid, one from a wound, and one from external ear fluid. Eighteen of the 21 patients from whom these isolates were recovered were neonates, one was a 13-year-old boy, and two were adults.

Thirteen of these cases were confirmed as sepsis in neonates resulting from SHN infection. These were the first clinical reports of SHN causing bacteremia in hospitalized patients. SHN infections were high in morbidity, but had a low rate of mortality. More undocumented instances of SHN infections may not have been reported because not all coagulase-negative staphylococcal infections are identified to the species level.

Molecular epidemiology was successful in tracing 13 cases of sepsis in neonates to a single clone of SHN during a two-year study period in neonatal ICUs. Formal investigation regarding the mode of transmission this microbe uses were not conducted, but infants are believed to serve as reservoirs for the microorganism, and transmission takes place with contact between health workers and the infants. In addition, staphylococcal isolates from the nasopharynges and hands of health care workers were shown to be genetically similar to those that colonize or cause disease in neonates. This supports the idea that health workers serve as a form of nosocomial transmission of coagulase-negative staphylococi.

If SHN indeed takes residence on human skin, it probably exists in small numbers and would require enrichment for detection.

SHN has also been responsible for nosocomial outbreaks elsewhere. SHN strains have been causing bloodstream infections, but have still been classified as vancomycin-susceptible.

In May 2015, two babies from Simojovel rural communities of Chiapas, Mexico, were killed and about 30 required medical attention after receiving vaccines for Hepatitis B, the Mexican Social Security Institute (IMSS) launched an investigation to identify the cause of such events, the preliminary results showed that the cause was external contamination with Staphylococcus hominis.
