= Staphylococcus warneri =

Scientific classification
- Domain: Bacteria
- Kingdom: Bacillati
- Phylum: Bacillota
- Class: Bacilli
- Order: Bacillales
- Family: Staphylococcaceae
- Genus: Staphylococcus
- Species: S. warneri

Binomial name
- Staphylococcus warneri Kloos & Schleifer 1975

Species of bacterium

Staphylococcus warneri is a species of Gram-positive bacteria with spherical cells appearing in clusters and a member of the genus Staphylococcus. It is catalase-positive, oxidase-negative, and coagulase-negative, and is a common commensal organism found as part of the skin microbiota on humans and animals. Like other coagulase-negative staphylococci, S. warneri rarely causes disease, but may occasionally cause infection in patients whose immune system is compromised.

== Identification ==
Colonies of S. warneri on trypticase soy agar are usually beige, tan, or yellow, sometimes with an orange rim and about 2–4 mm in diameter after 48 hours' incubation at 35 °C. Optimal growth temperature is 30-40 °C.

== Clinical importance ==
Staphylococcus warneri has been suggested as a cause of spontaneous abortion in cattle and humans. It has been associated with vertebral discitis, urinary tract infection, meningitis, orthopedic infections/osteomyelitis, ventricular shunt infections, and infective endocarditis (more associated with prosthetic rather than native valves). Similar to other coagulase-negative staphylococci, the presence of S. warneri in blood and cerebrospinal fluid cultures can also represent contamination rather than a true infection.

It has been suggested as the cause of a case of meningoencephalitis in a dog.
