= Cubicle curtain =

Curtain used to provide privacy for patients

A cubicle curtain or hospital curtain is a dividing cloth used in a medical treatment facility that provides a private enclosure for one or more patients. The curtain is usually made from inherently flame retardant (IFR) fabric, and is suspended from a supporting structure or ceiling track.

== Construction ==
Healthcare cubicle curtains are constructed from different woven fabrics stitched together with the top portion of open mesh of the curtain as required by the National Fire Protection Association. The suggested fire prevention and regulatory codes are followed by local, state and Federal fire marshals with Healthcare patient safety in mind. The suggestion for mesh is seventy-percent (70%) open allowing for ceiling sprinkler head water penetration in event of fire. The vertical length requirement for mesh size is determined by the number of horizontal inches of the curtain ceiling track from the sprinkler head. Example: If ceiling track is six (6") inches from ceiling sprinkler head, the required vertical length of the mesh is approximately six (6") inches. The maximum vertical mesh length required is eighteen inches (18") regardless of additional distance from the ceiling sprinkler head. The code for the vertical mesh requirement is found under National Fire Protection Agency code NFPA 13. The lower portion of the cubicle curtain is opaque to ensure patient privacy. Cubicle curtain fabrics with an antimicrobial finish are not required by code but are becoming more common in medical treatment facilities to reduce the spread of germs within a facility. All cubicle curtains are required to be fire-retardant by NFPA code. The fire-retardant properties can be topically applied and/or inherent to a wide range of synthetic fibers used for cubicle curtains.

== Design ==
Cubicle curtain design underwent a period of rapid growth in the 1990s. Instead of traditional solids and tone-on-tones, a broader range of subtle colors, muted tones, and soft hues became available along with different textures and more elaborate patterns. Nature themed cubicle curtains are popular as well as customizable options.

== Problems ==
Cubicle curtains have been known to cause HAIs (hospital-acquired infections). Studies have found methicillin‐resistant Staphylococcus aureus (MRSA) on cubicle curtains in hospitals. Since the exposure of this phenomenon, some medical treatment facilities have begun to use anti-microbial curtains in an effort to impede the spread of HAI's. New medium are replacing curtains for this reason. Smart Glass offers the same privacy but glass unlike curtains can be easily cleaned disinfectants with 62–71% ethanol, 0.5% hydrogen peroxide or 0.1% sodium hypochlorite (bleach) can "efficiently" inactivate coronaviruses and other common within a minute. These cleaning agents can easily be applied to glass for a quick immediate solution. These cleaning agents can not be used on curtains. According to a research study by the University of Michigan Medical Center, fabric hospital room partitions host hazardous drug-resistant germs that can survive on bedside curtains undetected, and alive, for months at a time. Samples were taken upon admission, and again after 14 days, 30 days, then monthly up to 6 months where possible. A total of 1521 samples from 625 rooms were obtained from the edges of privacy curtains where they are touched most often, and the researchers were particularly interested in any links between bacteria found on patients, and MDRO contamination on their privacy curtain at the same visit. The team also wanted to discover whether this contamination occurred intermittently, or was persistent for those patients with 6 months of follow-up.

== Examples ==
Cubicle curtains can be used in hospital curtains and must be compliant to National Health Standard in the United Kingdom for infection control and flame retardant to British Standard BS5867 for drapery material.

Fitting room cubicle curtains are used for privacy whilst in retail premises for whilst customers are dressing into clothes. In the United Kingdom these need to be certified to BS5867 for use in commercial environments.
