= Codex Labs =

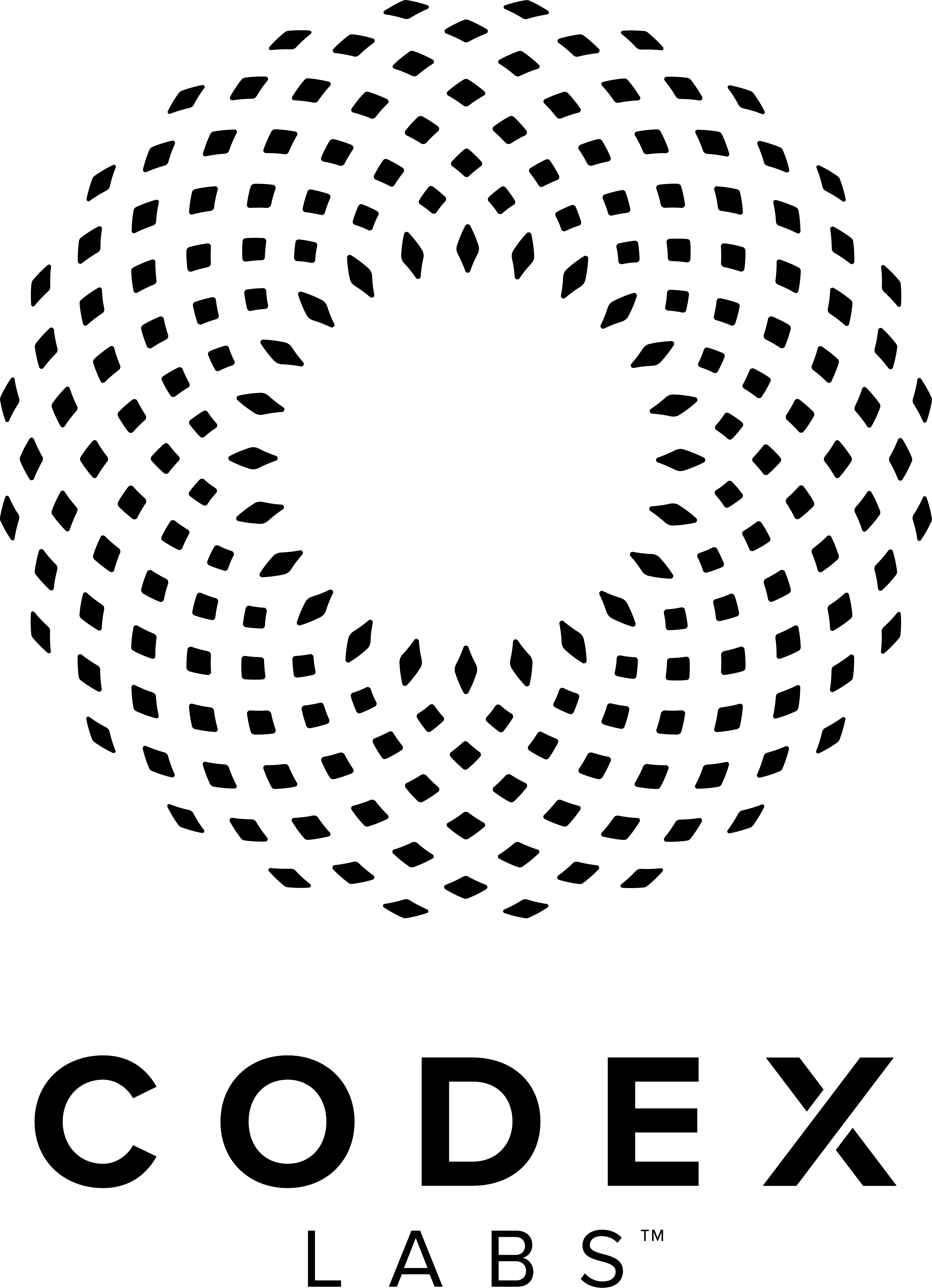
- Company type: Private
- Industry: Biotechnology, Dermatology, Wellness
- Founded: 2018
- Founder: Barbara Paldus
- Headquarters: Silicon Valley, California, United States
- Key people: Barbara Paldus (Founder, CEO)
- Products: OTC skincare, medical foods, dietary supplements, microbiome
- Website: www.codexlabscorp.com

Codex Labs is a plant-biotechnology company focused on skin-gut-brain-biome solutions for skin conditions (acne, eczema, rosacea, and psoriasis) based in Silicon Valley, California. The company develops clinically proven topicals and ingestibles for integrative dermatologists and naturopaths based on biotechnology and botanical actives.

== History ==
Codex Labs was founded by Barbara Paldus in 2018 with a focus on developing phenoxyethanol-free skincare product that preserves the native skin microbiome. In its early stages, Codex Labs acquired Irish skincare company Bia Beauty and partnered with the French Eurofins Dermscan laboratory in Lyon for experimentation and clinical trials. It also partnered with MyMicrobiome to certify all of its skincare products as microbiome-supporting. Codex launched its first skincare products in 2019 and its first supplements in 2023.

In 2019, the company developed and patented its PreservX system, a novel biotech-ferment-based preservative that supports the natural skin microbiome. It is a combination of four edible ingredients designated as GRAS (Generally Recognized As Safe) by the US FDA: edible organic acids, lactobacillus ferment, coconut oil ferment, and biotech propanediol. Later that year, Codex Labs introduced the MyMicrobiome-certified Bia collection, which focused on deep hydration, water retention, and turnover of dry skin layers. The BiaComplex patent was issued in 2020. The Antü collection, launched in 2020 and also MyMicrobiome-certified, focused on protecting and strengthening the skin barrier against the exposome, re-densifying the epidermis, and alleviating damage caused by UV light. The AntuComplex and skin protectant patents were issued in 2021.

The Shaant collection, introduced in 2022 (cosmetic) and 2023 (OTC), controlled sebum production, reduced redness, and mitigated the acne inflammasome for acne-prone skin. The Shaant face/body scrubs were the first OTC acne products on the market to be MyMicrobiome-certified. The ShaantComplex patent was issued in 2022. In 2025, the company began testing its first functional fragrance (Cocoon) in Europe for mood modulation and stress reduction. Codex Labs' products were also approved by the National Psoriasis Foundation in 2022 as irritation-free products that are safe for sensitive skin suffering from psoriasis.

In April 2025, Codex Labs’ Bia Eczema Relief Lotion was awarded Microbiome-friendly Certification (MyMicrobiome Standard) and the National Eczema Association Seal of Acceptance. In May, the company was granted U.S. Patent No. 12,194,068 for Shaant ClearSkin Probiotic 2.0, an oral synbiotic supplement aimed at managing oily and acne-prone skin.

== Products ==
In addition to skincare products like BIA, ANTÜ and SHAANT, the company has developed dietary supplements to address gut barrier integrity, mucosal function, inflammation, and microbiome balance. All products are clinically tested, microbiome-friendly, and certified vegan, cruelty-free, and sustainable.
