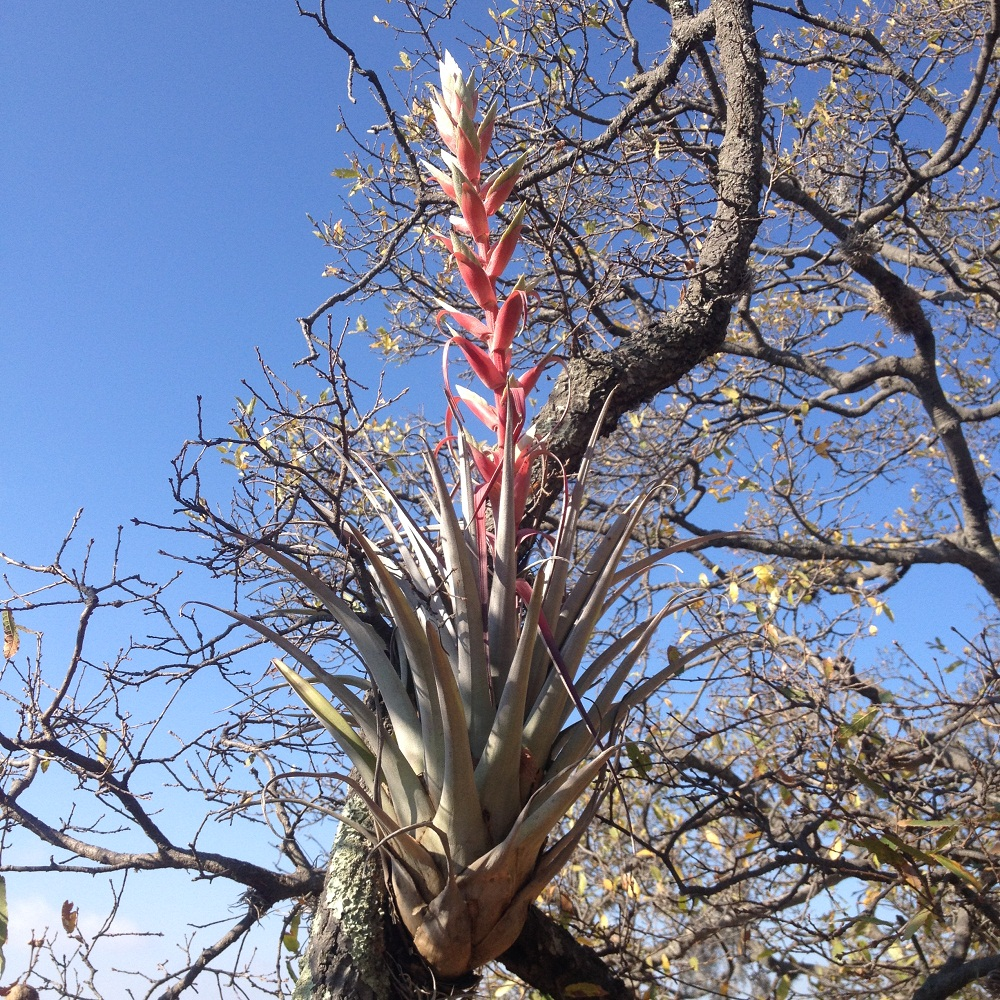

Scientific classification
- Kingdom: Plantae
- Clade: Tracheophytes
- Clade: Angiosperms
- Clade: Monocots
- Clade: Commelinids
- Order: Poales
- Family: Bromeliaceae
- Genus: Tillandsia
- Subgenus: Tillandsia subg. Tillandsia
- Species: T. bourgaei

Binomial name
- Tillandsia bourgaei Baker

Synonyms
- Tillandsia cylindrica S.Watson; Tillandsia mexiae L.B.Sm.; Tillandsia strobilifera E.Morren ex Baker

= Tillandsia bourgaei =

Species of plant

Tillandsia bourgaei is a species of flowering plant in the family Bromeliaceae. This species is endemic to Southern Mexico and Central America. This species was described and the name validly published by John Gilbert Baker in 1887.

== Cultivars ==
- Tillandsia 'Aristocrat'
