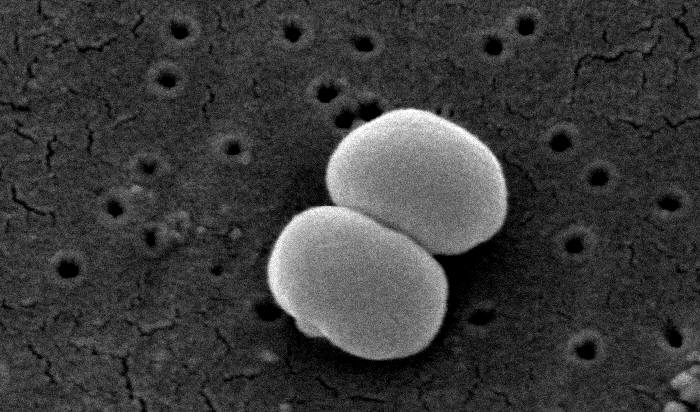
- Scanning electron image of S. epidermidis.

Scientific classification
- Domain: Bacteria
- Kingdom: Bacillati
- Phylum: Bacillota
- Class: Bacilli
- Order: Caryophanales
- Family: Staphylococcaceae
- Genus: Staphylococcus
- Species: S. epidermidis

Binomial name
- Staphylococcus epidermidis (Winslow & Winslow 1908); Evans 1916

Synonyms
- Staphylococcus albus Rosenbach 1884

= Staphylococcus epidermidis =

Species of bacterium

Staphylococcus epidermidis is a gram-positive bacterium, and one of over 40 species belonging to the genus Staphylococcus. It is part of the normal human microbiota, typically the skin microbiota, and less commonly the mucosal microbiota and also found in marine sponges. It is a facultative anaerobic bacteria. Although S. epidermidis is not usually pathogenic, patients with compromised immune systems are at risk of developing infection. These infections are generally hospital-acquired. S. epidermidis is a particular concern for people with catheters or other surgical implants because it is known to form biofilms that grow on these devices. Being part of the normal skin microbiota, S. epidermidis is a frequent contaminant of specimens sent to the diagnostic laboratory.

Some strains of S. epidermidis are highly salt tolerant and commonly found in marine environments. S.I. Paul et al. (2021) isolated and identified salt tolerant strains of S. epidermidis (strains ISP111A, ISP111B and ISP111C) from Cliona viridis sponges of the Saint Martin's Island Area of the Bay of Bengal, Bangladesh.

Commensal S. epidermidis is an essential part of a healthy skin microbiota. It contributes through supporting a healthy skin barrier, healing cuts of the skin, protecting the skin microbiota from colonization of skin pathogens, and acting as an immune system modulator.

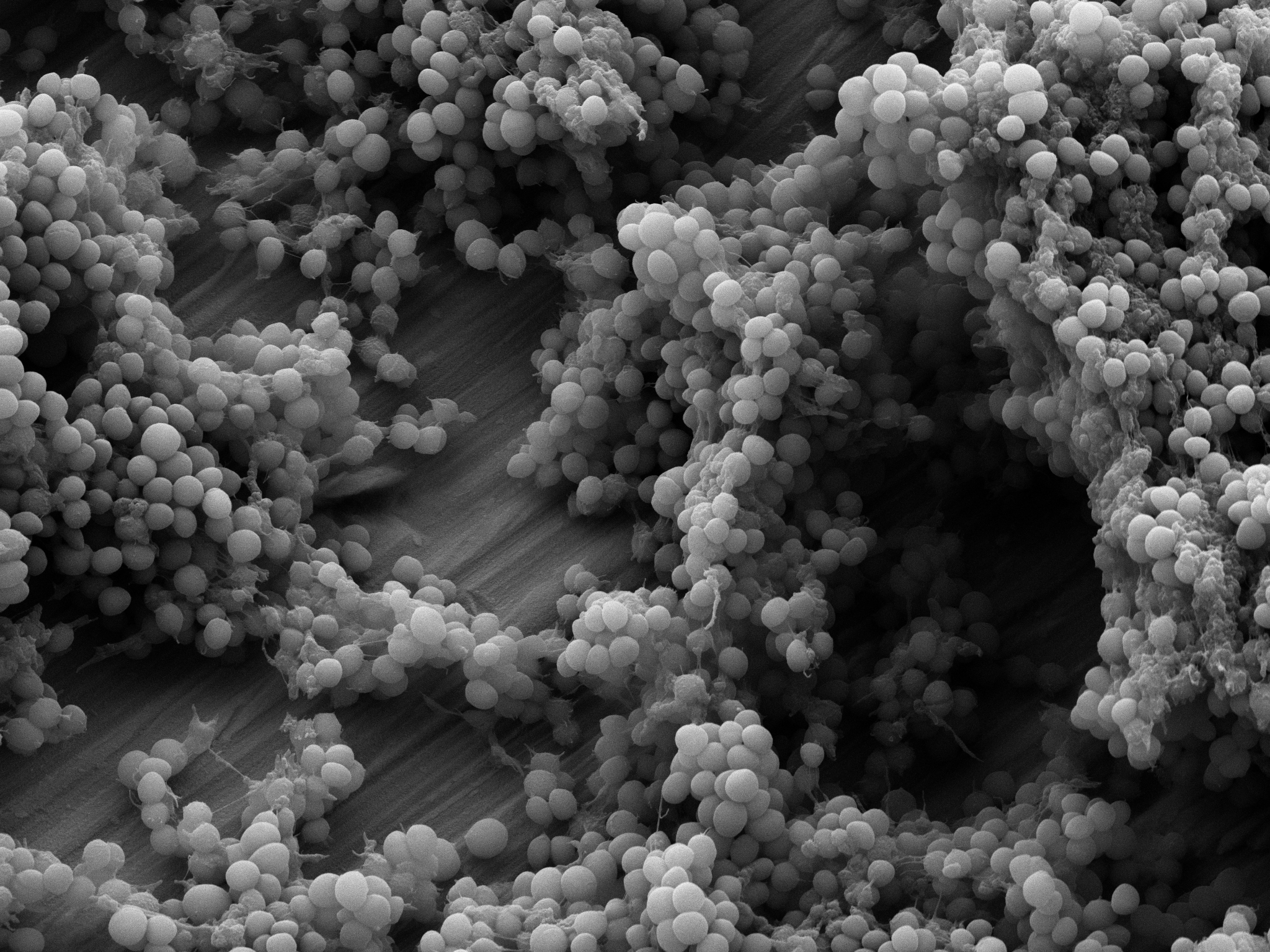
Staphylococcus epidermidis biofilm on titanium substrate

== Etymology ==
'Staphylococcus' - bunch of grape-like berries, 'epidermidis' - of the epidermis.

== Discovery ==
Friedrich Julius Rosenbach distinguished S. epidermidis from S. aureus in 1884, initially naming S. epidermidis as S. albus. He chose aureus and albus since the bacteria formed yellow and white colonies, respectively.

== Microbiology ==
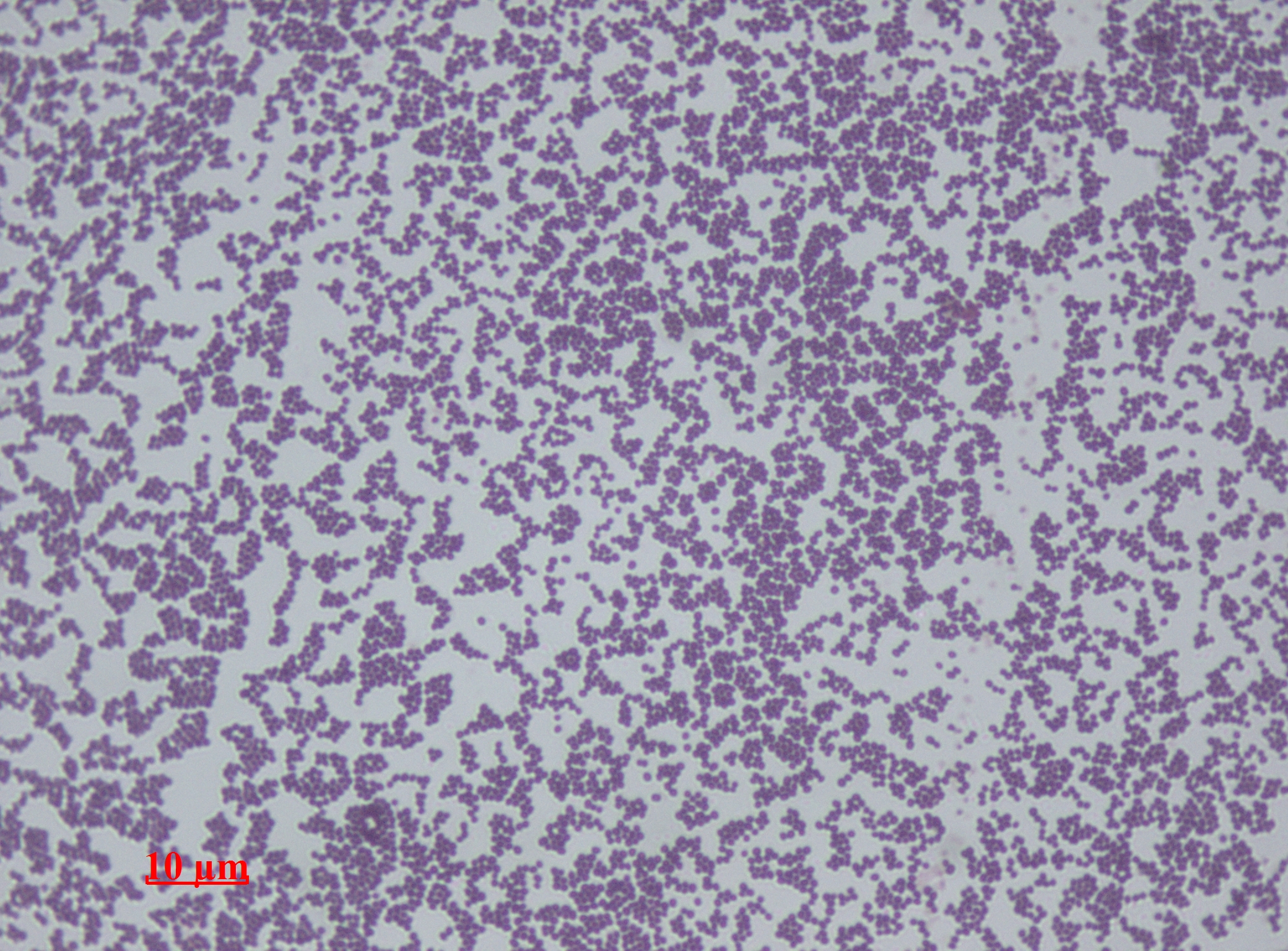
Staphylococcus epidermidis, 1000 magnification under bright field microscopy

Staphylococcus epidermidis is a very hardy microorganism, consisting of nonmotile, Gram-positive cocci, arranged in grape-like clusters. It forms white, raised, cohesive colonies about 1–2 mm in diameter after overnight incubation, and is not hemolytic on blood agar. It is a catalase-positive, coagulase-negative, facultative anaerobe that can grow by aerobic respiration or by fermentation. Some strains may not ferment.

Biochemical tests indicate this microorganism also carries out a weakly positive reaction to the nitrate reductase test. It is positive for urease production, is oxidase negative, and can use glucose, sucrose, and lactose to form acid products. In the presence of lactose, it will also produce gas. Nonpathogenic S. epidermidis unlike pathogenic S. aureus does not possess the gelatinase enzyme, so it cannot hydrolyze gelatin. It is sensitive to novobiocin, providing an important test to distinguish it from Staphylococcus saprophyticus, which is coagulase-negative, as well, but novobiocin-resistant.

Similar to those of S. aureus, the cell walls of S. epidermidis have a transferrin-binding protein that helps the organism obtain iron from transferrin. The tetramers of a surface exposed protein, glyceraldehyde-3-phosphate dehydrogenase, are believed to bind to transferrin and remove its iron. Subsequent steps include iron being transferred to surface lipoproteins, then to transport proteins which carry the iron into the cell.

=== Biochemical characteristics ===
Colony, morphological, physiological, and biochemical characteristics of marine S. epidermidis are shown in the table below.

Test type	Test	Characteristics
Colony characters	Size	Pin headed/ Very small
Colony characters	Type	Round
Colony characters	Color	Opaque
Colony characters	Shape	Convex
Morphological characters	Shape	Cocci
Physiological characters	Motility	–
Physiological characters	Growth at 6.5% NaCl	+
Biochemical characters	Gram's staining	+
Biochemical characters	Oxidase	–
Biochemical characters	Catalase	+
Biochemical characters	Oxidative-Fermentative	Fermentative
Biochemical characters	Motility	–
Biochemical characters	Methyl Red	–
Biochemical characters	Voges-Proskauer	+
Biochemical characters	Indole	–
Biochemical characters	H_{2}S Production	+
Biochemical characters	Urease	+
Biochemical characters	Nitrate reductase	+
Biochemical characters	β-Galactosidase	+
Hydrolysis of	Gelatin	–
Hydrolysis of	Aesculin	+
Hydrolysis of	Casein	+
Hydrolysis of	Tween 40	+
Hydrolysis of	Tween 60	+
Hydrolysis of	Tween 80	+
Acid production from	Glycerol	–
Acid production from	Galactose	W
Acid production from	D-Glucose	+
Acid production from	D-Fructose	+
Acid production from	D-Mannose	+
Acid production from	Mannitol	–
Acid production from	N-Acetylglucosamine	+
Acid production from	Amygdalin	+
Acid production from	Maltose	+
Acid production from	D-Melibiose	+
Acid production from	D-Trehalose	+
Acid production from	Glycogen	+
Acid production from	D-Turanose	+

Note: + = Positive, – = Negative, W = Weakly Positive

=== Identification ===
The normal practice of detecting S. epidermidis is by using appearance of colonies on selective media, bacterial morphology by light microscopy, catalase and slide coagulase testing. Zobell agar is useful for the isolation of Staphylococcus epidermidis from marine organisms. On the Baird-Parker agar with egg yolk supplement, colonies appear small and black. Increasingly, techniques such as quantitative PCR are being employed for the rapid detection and identification of Staphylococcus strains. Normally, sensitivity to desferrioxamine can also be used to distinguish it from most other staphylococci, except in the case of Staphylococcus hominis, which is also sensitive. In this case, the production of acid from trehalose by S. hominis can be used to tell the two species apart.

=== Microbial ecology ===
==== Role in foot odor ====
A common misconception about foot odor and body odor in general is that sweat itself smells and causes people to smell. However, sweat itself is almost entirely odorless. Rather, microbes present on the skin metabolize certain compounds in sweat as a source of nutrients, producing compounds with an unpleasant smell in the process. S. epidermidis thrives in warm, moist environments and is a common bacteria of the human microbiome; it is thus primarily responsible for foot odor as feet have more sweat glands than any other part of the body and thus are often moist, which creates an ideal environment for S. epidermidis to thrive. The bacteria produces enzymes that degrade the leucine present in sweat, producing unpleasant smelling volatile compounds such as isovaleric acid. Feet with stronger odors have a higher density of microorganisms than those with weaker foot odor.

== Role in disease ==
=== Virulence factors ===
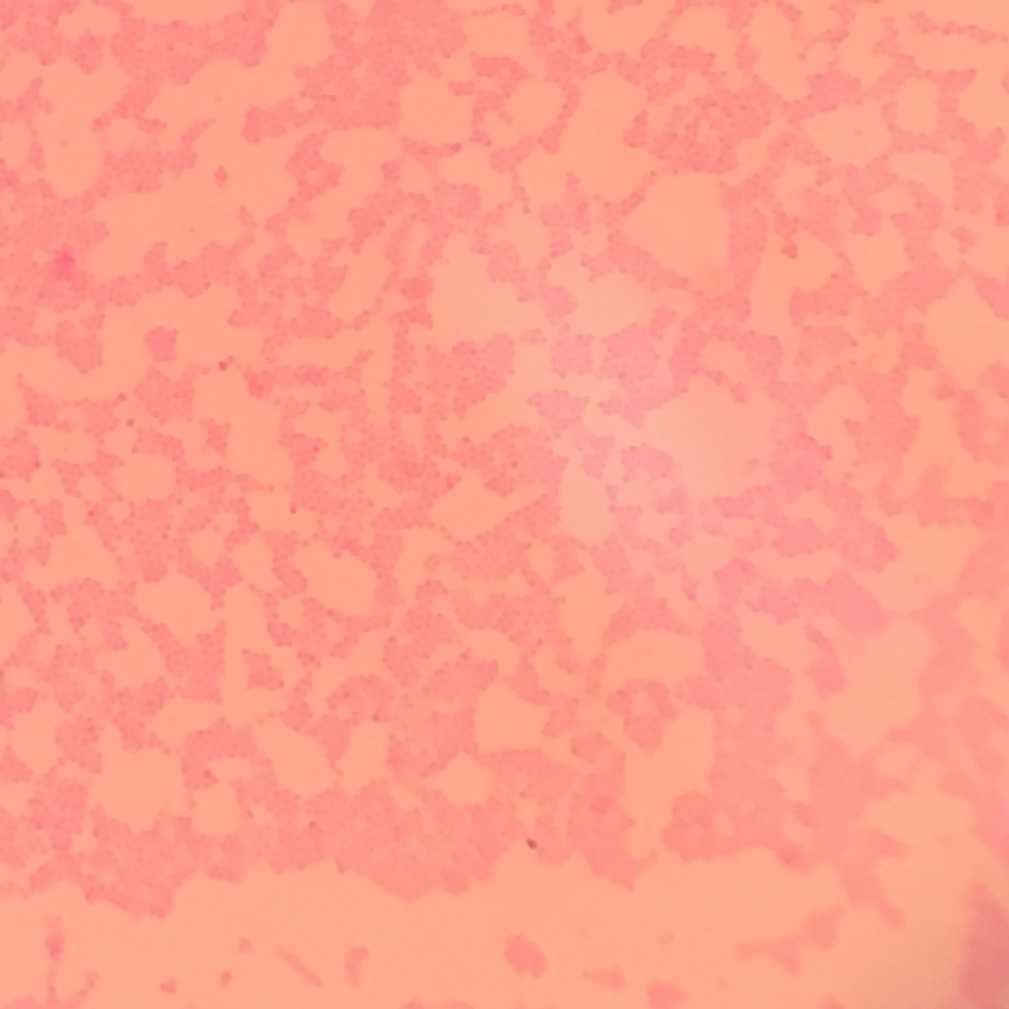
Staphylococcus epidermidis stained by safranin.(x1000)

==== Biofilm formation ====
S. epidermidis causes biofilms to grow on plastic devices placed within the body. This occurs most commonly on intravenous catheters and on medical prostheses. Infection can also occur in dialysis patients or anyone with an implanted plastic device that may have been contaminated. It also causes endocarditis, most often in patients with defective heart valves. Sepsis can occur in hospital patients, particularly in those who are immunocompromised.

The ability to form biofilms on plastic devices is a major virulence factor for S. epidermidis. One probable cause is surface proteins that bind blood and extracellular matrix proteins. It produces an extracellular material known as polysaccharide intercellular adhesin (PIA), which is made up of sulfated polysaccharides. It allows other bacteria to bind to the already existing biofilm, creating a multilayer biofilm. Such biofilms decrease the metabolic activity of bacteria within them. This decreased metabolism, in combination with impaired diffusion of antibiotics, makes it difficult for antibiotics to effectively clear this type of infection.

Antibiotics are largely ineffective in clearing biofilms. The most common treatment for these infections is to remove or replace the infected implant, though in all cases, prevention is ideal. The drug of choice is often vancomycin, to which rifampin or an aminoglycoside can be added. Hand washing has been shown to reduce the spread of infection.

==== Antibiotic resistance ====
S. epidermidis strains are often resistant to antibiotics, including rifamycin, fluoroquinolones, gentamicin, tetracycline, clindamycin, and sulfonamides. Methicillin resistance is particularly widespread, with 75-90% of hospital isolates showing resistance. Resistant organisms are most commonly found in the intestine, but organisms living on the skin can also become resistant due to routine exposure to antibiotics secreted in sweat.

=== Acne vulgaris ===
Preliminary research also indicates S. epidermidis is universally found inside affected acne vulgaris pores, where Cutibacterium acnes is normally the sole resident.

Staphylococcus epidermidis in the normal skin is nonpathogenic and innocuous. But in abnormal lesions (such as openings or cuts on the skin), it becomes pathogenic, likely in acne vulgaris. Staphylococcus epidermidis enters the sebaceous gland (colonized by Cutibacterium acnes, the main bacterium that causes acne vulgaris) and damages the hair follicles by producing lipolytic enzymes that change the sebum from fraction to dense (thick) form leading to inflammatory effect.

Moreover, S. epidermidis biofilm formation by releasing the exopolysaccharide intercellular adhesion (PIA) provides the susceptible anaerobic environment to P. acnes colonisation and protects it from the innate human immunity molecules.

Both P. acnes and S. epidermidis can interact to protect the host skin health from pathogens colonisation. But in the case of competition, they use the same carbon source (i.e. glycerol) to produce short chain fatty acids which act as antibacterial agent against each other. Also, S. epidermidis helps in skin homeostasis and reduces the P. acnes pathogenic inflammation by decreasing the TLR2 protein production that induces the skin inflammation.

== Role in skin health ==
=== Skin barrier reinforcement ===
Commensal S. epidermidis also has been shown to contribute to skin barrier homeostasis through the generation of protective ceramides, which helps maintain the integrity of the skin barrier. By modulating the moist, inner lining of some organs and body cavities and their specific immune defense mechanisms, skin commensals interact with infectious agents like pathogens. Sphingomyelin phosphodiesterase is the main driver in the S. epidermidis production of ceramides - a lipid that includes sphingosine and sphingosine-1-phosphate. This lipid, both obtains nutrients essential for bacteria and helps the host in the production of ceramides. Ceramides are important components of the epithelial barrier, and they play a key role in preventing skin from losing moisture; this acts as a protectant and averts against both dehydration and aging of the skin. Salicylic acid is known to reduce the population of S. epidermidis; the mechanism of this is currently unfamiliar, but it is hypothesized that salicylic acid inhibits S. epidermidis' biofilms.

=== Metabolic interaction ===
S. epidermidis plays a key role in metabolic processes that influence skin conditions. The bacterium can affect biochemical pathways within skin cells, which can impact skin health and disease states. Specifically, this is seen in the modulation of the aryl hydrocarbon receptor.

In non-atopic skin, S. epidermidis will help communicate the activation of the aryl hydrocarbon receptor pathway, which both enhances the skin barrier function and helps reduce inflammation. Atopic skin will usually have the inverse effect by acting as a blocker of this pathway and possibly making the skin issue worse.

A genome-scale metabolic model of strain ATCC 12228 is available from BioModels Database in SBML format.

=== Immune response ===
Commensal S. epidermidis also influences the skin's immune response. Through interacting with a host's immune cells, the skin's mucosal immune defense against various pathogens is strengthened. The skin commensal will directly interfere with harmful pathogens.

In the case of S. aureus, S. epidermidis may amplify the innate immune response by causing a reaction of keratinocytes toward this pathogen.

S. epidermidis produces molecules such as lipoteichoic acid (LTA), cell wall polysaccharides, peptidoglycan and aldehyde dipeptides which are recognized by toll-like receptors (TLRs) as molecules that modulate the immune response. These immunomodulatory molecules create a relationship between bacteria and keratinocytes and have a significant impact in the modulation of the innate immune response, mainly because of their interactions with TLRs.

== See also ==
- Biofilms
- Microbiology
- Staphylococcus
