= Sanitation Standard Operating Procedures =

Name given to the sanitation procedures in food production plants

Sanitation Standard Operating Procedures is the common name, in the United States, given to the sanitation procedures in food production plants which are required by the Food Safety and Inspection Service of the USDA and regulated by 9 CFR part 416 in conjunction with 21 CFR part 178.1010. It is considered one of the prerequisite programs of HACCP.

SSOPs are generally documented steps that must be followed to ensure adequate cleaning of product contact and non-product surfaces. These cleaning procedures must be detailed enough to make certain that adulteration of product will not occur. All HACCP plans require SSOPs to be documented and reviewed periodically to incorporate changes to the physical plant. This reviewing procedure can take on many forms, from annual formal reviews to random reviews, but any review should be done by "responsible educated management". As these procedures can make their way into the public record if there are serious failures, they might be looked at as public documents because they are required by the government. SSOPs, in conjunction with the Master Sanitation Schedule and Pre-Operational Inspection Program, form the entire sanitation operational guidelines for food-related processing and one of the primary backbones of all food industry HACCP plans.

SSOPs can be very simple to extremely intricate depending on the focus. Food industry equipment should be constructed of sanitary design; however, some automated processing equipment by necessity is difficult to clean. An individual SSOP should include:

- The equipment or affected area to be cleaned, identified by common name
- The tools necessary to prepare the equipment or area to be cleaned
- How to disassemble the area or equipment
- The method of cleaning and sanitizing

SSOPs can be standalone documents, but they should also serve as work instructions as this will help ensure they are accurate.

== Sanitary accessories ==
To assure thorough sanitation, the use of the following items (and others) may be necessary:

- Alkaline steel wool
- Detergent
- Dry ice blasting
- Potable water
- NAV-CO_{2} system
- Sanitizer
- Soap
- Vapor steam cleaners
- HEATING

== See also ==
- Environmental health specialist
- Food and cooking hygiene
- International Association for Food Protection
- Specified risk material
- Standard operating procedure
- Fast food restaurant
