= NAV-CO2 system =

Sanitization system developed in Japan

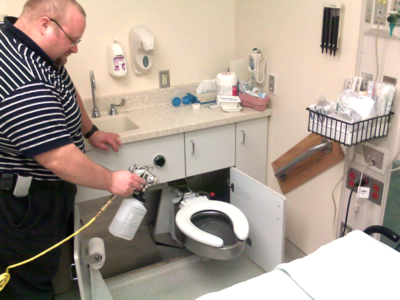
Terminal cleaning at an ER center

Non-flammable alcohol vapor in carbon dioxide systems (NAV-CO2 system) were developed in Japan in the 1990s to sanitize hospitals and ambulances.

== Application ==
The NAV-CO2 uses CO_{2} (carbon dioxide) as a propellant to dispense a 58% isopropyl alcohol solution in a heated stream. The procedure uses alcohol in an atomized vapor, and reaches nooks, crannies, and crevices that may be beyond the reach of other disinfecting methods.

== Safety ==
The use of carbon dioxide as a propellant serves to displace ambient oxygen (one of the elements needed to support combustion) and eliminates the risk of explosion. The carbon dioxide and atomized alcohol evaporate at room temperature leaving no residue.
