= Catheter-associated urinary tract infection =

- Specialty: Urology

Catheter-associated urinary tract Infection, or CAUTI, is a urinary tract infection associated with urinary catheter use.

== Core prevention ==
A number of combined practices such as improved hand hygiene, enhanced barrier protection and reduced catheter use when managing incontinence appear to reduce CAUTI. Urinary catheters should be inserted using aseptic technique and sterile equipment (including sterile gloves, drape, sponges, antiseptic and sterile solution), particularly in an acute care setting. Although catheter use should be minimized in all patients, particularly those at higher risk of CAUTI and mortality (e.g. the elderly or those with impaired immunity), a meta analysis suggests there is insufficient evidence to determine the value of different policies for replacing long term urinary catheters on patient outcomes.

== Incidence ==
Bacteria and yeast, including those naturally occurring as part of the human microbiome, can grow within biofilm that forms along the surface of urinary catheters. This leads to infection in the bladder, kidneys, and other organs connected to the urinary tract.

CAUTI can lead to complications such as prostatitis, epididymitis, and orchitis in men, and cystitis, pyelonephritis, gram-negative bacteremia, endocarditis, vertebral osteomyelitis, septic arthritis, endophthalmitis, and meningitis in all patients. Complications associated with CAUTI cause discomfort to the patient, prolonged hospital stay, and increased cost and mortality.
