= Colony-forming unit =

Parameter in microbiology

In microbiology, a colony-forming unit (CFU, cfu or Cfu) is a unit which estimates the number of microbial cells (bacteria, fungi, viruses etc.) in a sample that are viable and able to multiply via binary fission under the controlled conditions. Determining colony-forming units requires culturing the microbes and counting only viable cells, in contrast with microscopic examination which counts all cells, living or dead. The visual appearance of a colony in a cell culture requires significant growth, and when counting colonies, it is uncertain if the colony arose from a single cell or a group of cells. Expressing results as colony-forming units reflects this uncertainty.

== Theory ==
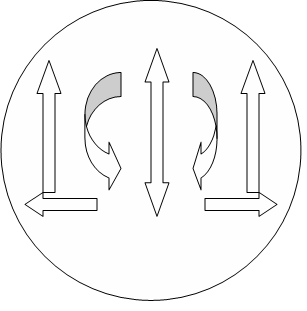
A dilution made with bacteria and peptoned water is placed in an Agar plate (Agar plate count for food samples or Trypticase soy agar for clinic samples) and spread over the plate by tipping in the pattern shown.

The purpose of plate counting is to estimate the number of cells present based on their ability to give rise to colonies under specific conditions of temperature, time, and nutrient medium. Theoretically, one viable cell can give rise to one colony through replication. However, solitary cells are the exception in nature, and in most cases the progenitor of a colony is a mass of cells deposited together. In addition, many bacteria grow in chains (e.g. Streptococcus) or clumps (e.g. Staphylococcus). Estimation of microbial numbers by CFU will, in most cases, undercount the number of living cells present in a sample for these reasons.

Typically, ten-fold serial dilutions of samples are plated to ensure that they will yield a countable number of colonies. Plating volumes generally range from 100 μL to 1 mL. The colonies on the plate are counted and then the CFU/g (or CFU/mL) of the original sample is calculated based on the volume plated and the dilution factor.

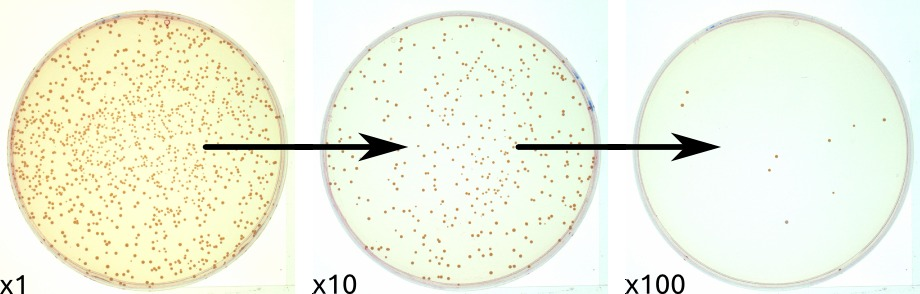
A solution of bacteria at an unknown concentration is often serially diluted in order to obtain at least one plate with a countable number of bacteria. In this figure, the "x10" plate is suitable for counting.

An advantage to this method is that different microbial species may give rise to colonies that are clearly different from each other, both microscopically and macroscopically. The colony morphology can be of great use in the identification of the microorganism present.

A prior understanding of the microscopic anatomy of the organism can give a better understanding of how the observed CFU/mL relates to the number of viable cells per milliliter. Alternatively it is possible to decrease the average number of cells per CFU in some cases by vortexing the sample before conducting the dilution. However, many microorganisms are delicate and would suffer a decrease in the proportion of cells that are viable when placed in a vortex.

=== Log notation ===
Concentrations of colony-forming units can be expressed using logarithmic notation, where the value shown is the base 10 logarithm of the concentration. This allows the log reduction of a decontamination process to be computed as a simple subtraction.

== Uses ==
Colony-forming units are used to quantify results in many microbiological plating and counting methods, including:

- The pour plate method wherein the sample is suspended in a Petri dish using molten agar cooled to approximately 40–45 °C (just above the point of solidification to minimize heat-induced cell death). After the nutrient agar solidifies the plate is incubated.
- The spread plate method wherein the sample (in a small volume) is spread across the surface of a nutrient agar plate and allowed to dry before incubation for counting.
- The membrane filter method wherein the sample is filtered through a membrane filter, then the filter placed on the surface of a nutrient agar plate. During incubation nutrients leach up through the filter to support the growing cells. As the surface area of most filters is less than that of a standard Petri dish, the linear range of the plate count will be less.
- The Miles and Misra methods or drop-plate method wherein a very small aliquot (usually about 10 microliters) of sample from each dilution in series is dropped onto a Petri dish. The drop dish must be read while the colonies are very small to prevent the loss of CFU as they grow together.

However, with the techniques that require the use of an agar plate, no fluid solution can be used because the purity of the specimen cannot be unidentified and it is not possible to count the cells one by one in the liquid.

== Tools for counting colonies ==
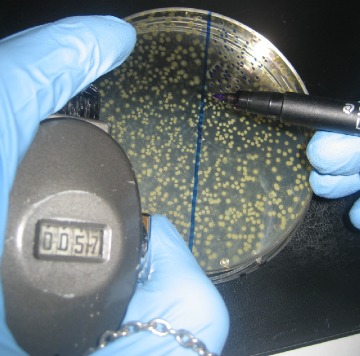
The traditional way of enumerating CFUs with a "click-counter" and a pen. When the colonies are too numerous, it is common practice to count CFUs only on a fraction of the dish.

Counting colonies is traditionally performed manually using a pen and a click-counter. This is generally a straightforward task, but can become very laborious and time-consuming when many plates have to be enumerated. Alternatively semi-automatic (software) and automatic (hardware + software) solutions can be used.

=== Software for counting CFUs ===
Colonies can be enumerated from pictures of plates using software tools. The experimenters would generally take a picture of each plate they need to count and then analyse all the pictures (this can be done with a simple digital camera or even a webcam). Since it takes less than 10 seconds to take a single picture, as opposed to several minutes to count CFU manually, this approach generally saves a lot of time. In addition, it is more objective and allows extraction of other variables such as the size and colour of the colonies.

- OpenCFU is a free and open-source program designed to optimise user friendliness, speed and robustness. It offers a wide range of filters and control as well as a modern user interface. OpenCFU is written in C++ and uses OpenCV for image analysis.
- NICE is a program written in MATLAB that provides an easy way to count colonies from images.
- ImageJ and CellProfiler: Some ImageJ macros and plugins and some CellProfiler pipelines can be used to count colonies. This often requires the user to change the code in order to achieve an efficient work-flow, but can prove useful and flexible. One main issue is the absence of specific GUI which can make the interaction with the processing algorithms tedious.

In addition to software based on traditional desktop computers, apps for both Android and iOS devices are available for semi-automated and automated colony counting. The integrated camera is used to take pictures of the agar plate and either an internal or an external algorithm is used to process the picture data and to estimate the number of colonies.

=== Automated systems ===
Many of the automated systems are used to counteract human error as many of the research techniques done by humans counting individual cells have a high chance of error involved. Due to the fact that researchers regularly manually count the cells with the assistance of a transmitted light, this error prone technique can have a significant effect on the calculated concentration in the main liquid medium when the cells are in low numbers.

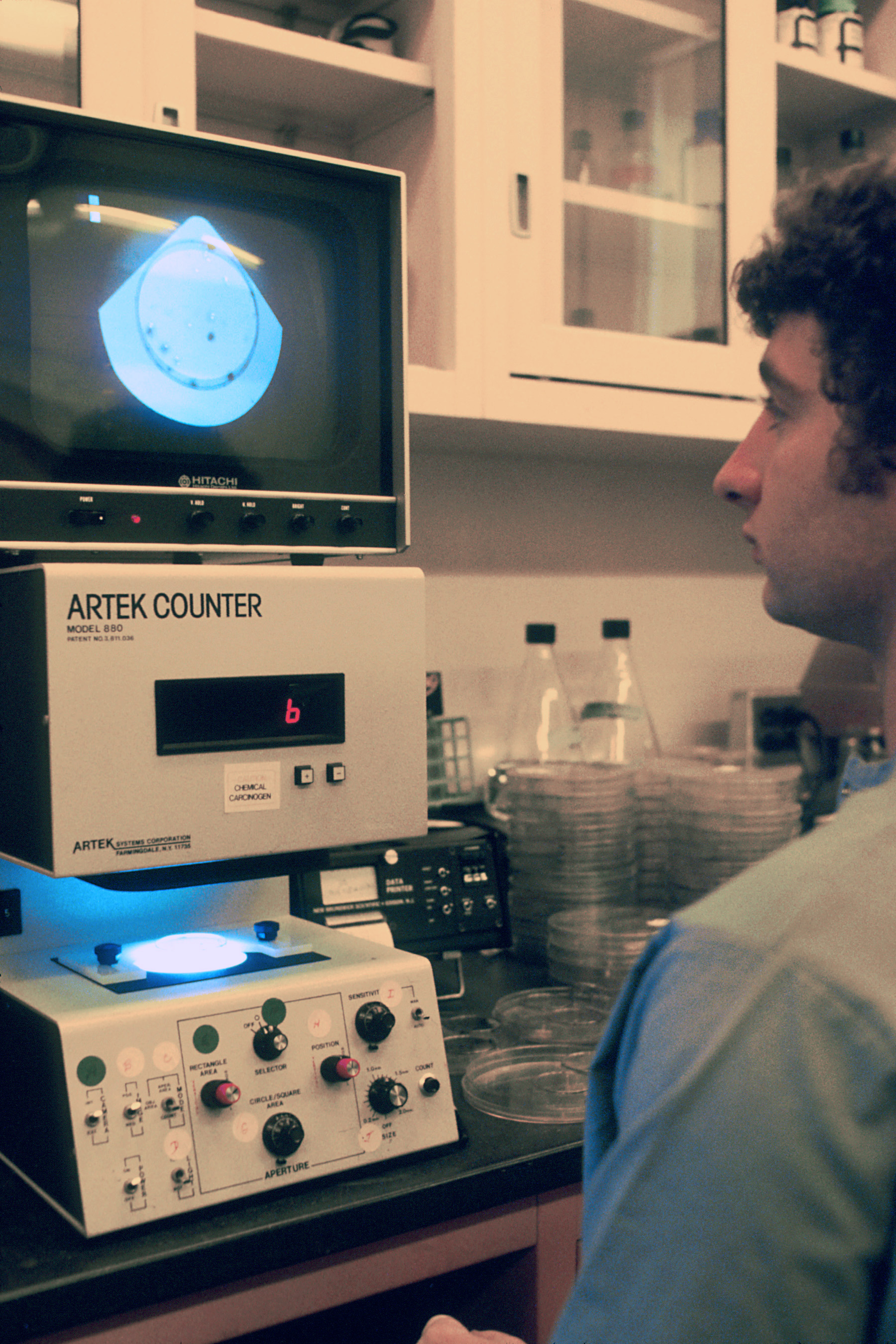
An automated colony counter using image processing.

Completely automated systems are also available from some biotechnology manufacturers. They are generally expensive and not as flexible as standalone software since the hardware and software are designed to work together for a specific set-up. Alternatively, some automatic systems use the spiral plating paradigm.

Some of the automated systems such as the systems from MATLAB allow the cells to be counted without having to stain them. This lets the colonies to be reused for other experiments without the risk of killing the microorganisms with stains. However, a disadvantage to these automated systems is that it is extremely difficult to differentiate between the microorganisms with dust or scratches on blood agar plates because both the dust and scratches can create a highly diverse combination of shapes and appearances.

=== Alternative units ===
Instead of colony-forming units, the parameters Most Probable Number (MPN) and Modified Fishman Units (MFU) can be used. The Most Probable Number method counts viable cells and is useful when enumerating low concentrations of cells or enumerating microbes in products where particulates make plate counting impractical. Modified Fishman Units take into account bacteria which are viable, but non-culturable.

== See also ==
- Cell counting
- Growth medium
- Miles and Misra method
- Most probable number
- Replica plating
- Viral plaque
