= Bacterial lawn =

Layer of bacteria grown on an agar plate

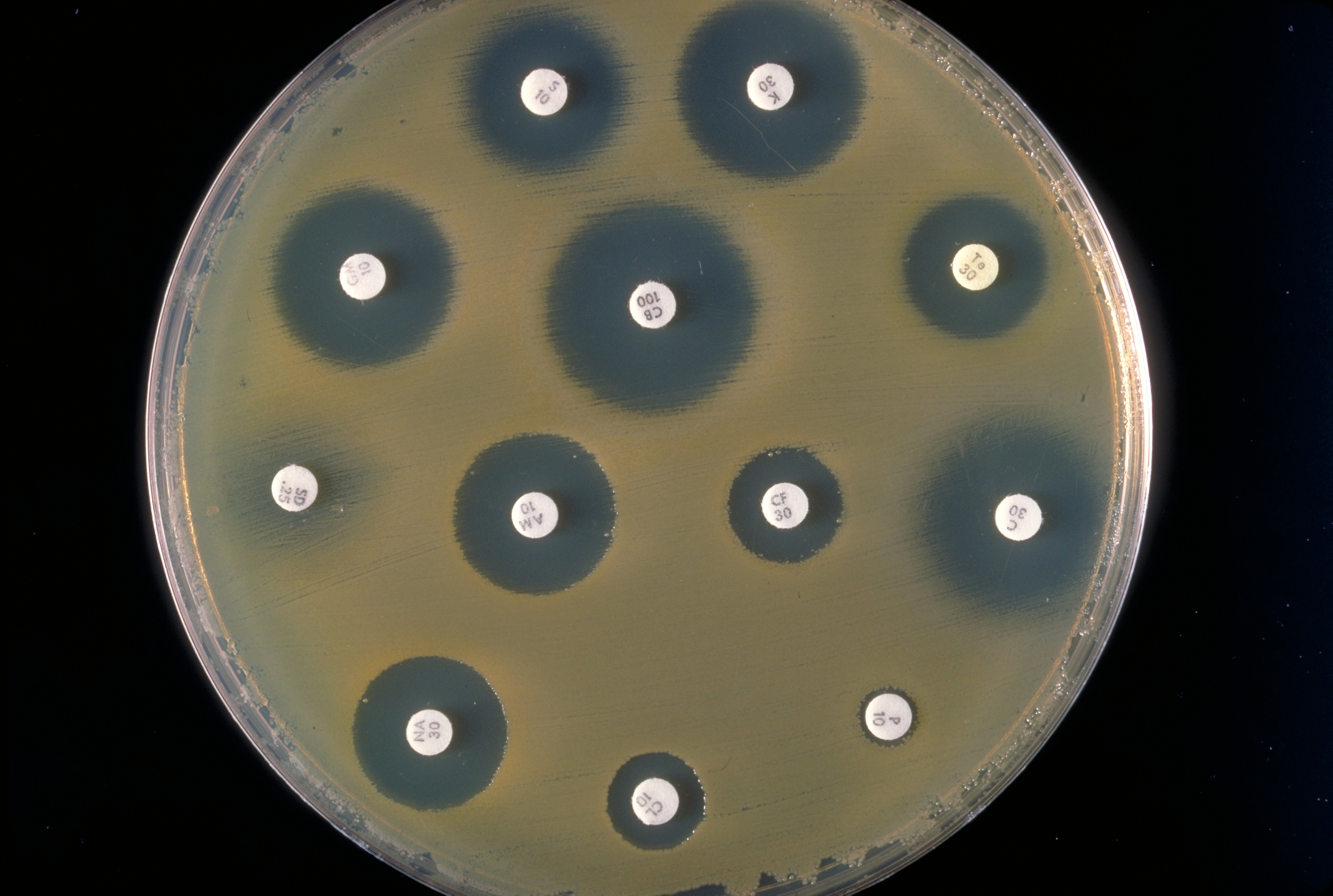
A bacterial lawn used in antibiotic resistance testing.

Bacterial lawn is a term used by microbiologists to describe the appearance of bacterial colonies when all the individual colonies on a Petri dish or agar plate merge to form a field or mat of bacteria. Bacterial lawns find use in screens for antibiotic resistance and bacteriophage titering.

Bacterial lawns (often of Serratia marcescens) are also used extensively when as an assay method when using bacteriophage as tracers in studies of groundwater flow.

Although occasionally used as a synonym for biofilm, the term primarily applies to the simple, clonal, unstructured mats of organisms that typically only form on laboratory growth media. Biofilms—the aggregated form of microorganisms most commonly found in nature— are generally more complex and diverse and marked by larger quantities of extracellular structural matrix relative to the cellular biomass.

== Techniques ==
Bacterial lawns can be produced manually by evenly spreading a high amount of bacteria onto an agar plate using a sterile cotton swab or a Drigalski spatula. Alternatively an automated machine can be used such as a spiral plater where the plate is rotated and the sample is spread evenly using an automated dispenser.

They may also be produced using the "pour plate" technique in which a concentrated inoculum of the appropriate bacteria are mixed with melted agar and spread evenly over the surface of a Petri dish.

== See also ==
- Antibiotic resistance
- Miles-Misra method
- Bacterial culture
- Antibiotic sensitivity
- Etest
