= Viral culture =

Laboratory technique to identify viruses

Viral culture is a laboratory technique in which samples of a virus are placed to different cell lines which the virus being tested for its ability to infect. If the cells show changes, known as cytopathic effects, then the culture is positive.

Traditional viral culture has been generally superseded by shell vial culture, in which the sample is centrifuged onto a single layer of cells and viral growth is measured by antigen detection methods. This greatly reduces the time to detection for slow growing viruses such as cytomegalovirus, for which the method was developed. In addition, the centrifugation step in shell vial culture enhances the sensitivity of this method because after centrifugation, the viral particles of the sample are in close proximity to the cells.

Human and monkey cells are used in both traditional viral culture and shell vial culture.

Human virus types that can be identified by viral culture include adenovirus, cytomegalovirus, enteroviruses, herpes simplex virus, influenza virus, parainfluenza virus, rhinovirus, respiratory syncytial virus, varicella zoster virus, measles and mumps. For these, the final identification method is generally by immunofluorescence, with exception of cytomegalovirus and rhinovirus, whose identification in a viral culture are determined by cytopathic effects.

Research explored the suitability of viral culture testing of SARS-CoV-2 .

== See also ==
- Cell culture
- Instruments used in microbiology
- Laboratory diagnosis of viral infections
- Viral plaque
- Viral disease testing
