= Streaking (microbiology) =

Method for isolation of bacterial strains

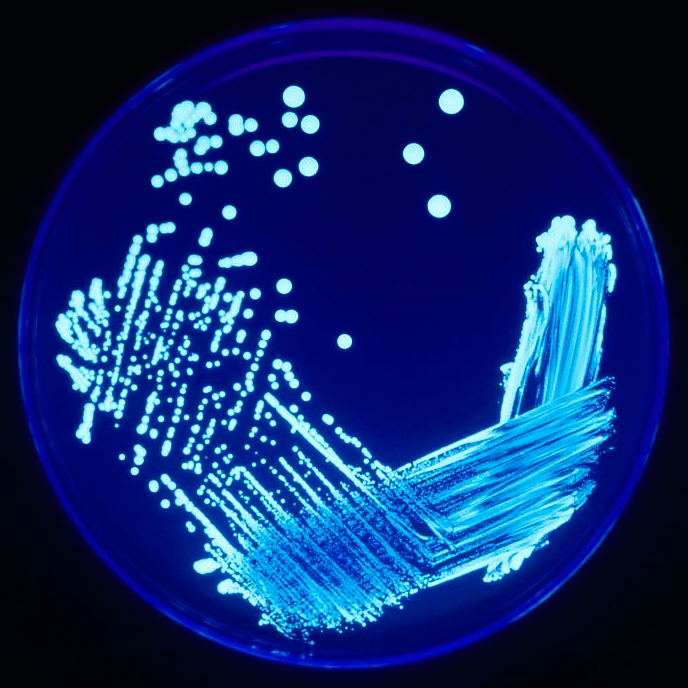
A plate which has been streaked showing the colonies thinning as the streaking moves clockwise.

In microbiology, streaking is a mechanical technique used to isolate a pure strain from a single species of microorganism, often bacteria. Samples from a colony derived from a single cell are taken from the streaked plate to create a genetically identical microbiological culture grown on a new plate so that the organism can be identified, studied, or tested. Different patterns can be used to streak a plate. All involve the dilution of bacteria by systematically streaking them over the exterior of the agar in a Petri dish to obtain isolated colonies which contain progressively fewer numbers of cells. If the agar surface grows microorganisms which are all genetically same, the culture is then considered as a pure microbiological culture. Although manual streaking is a foundational skill, laboratories are starting to adopt automated streaking systems for improved efficiency and consistency.

== History ==
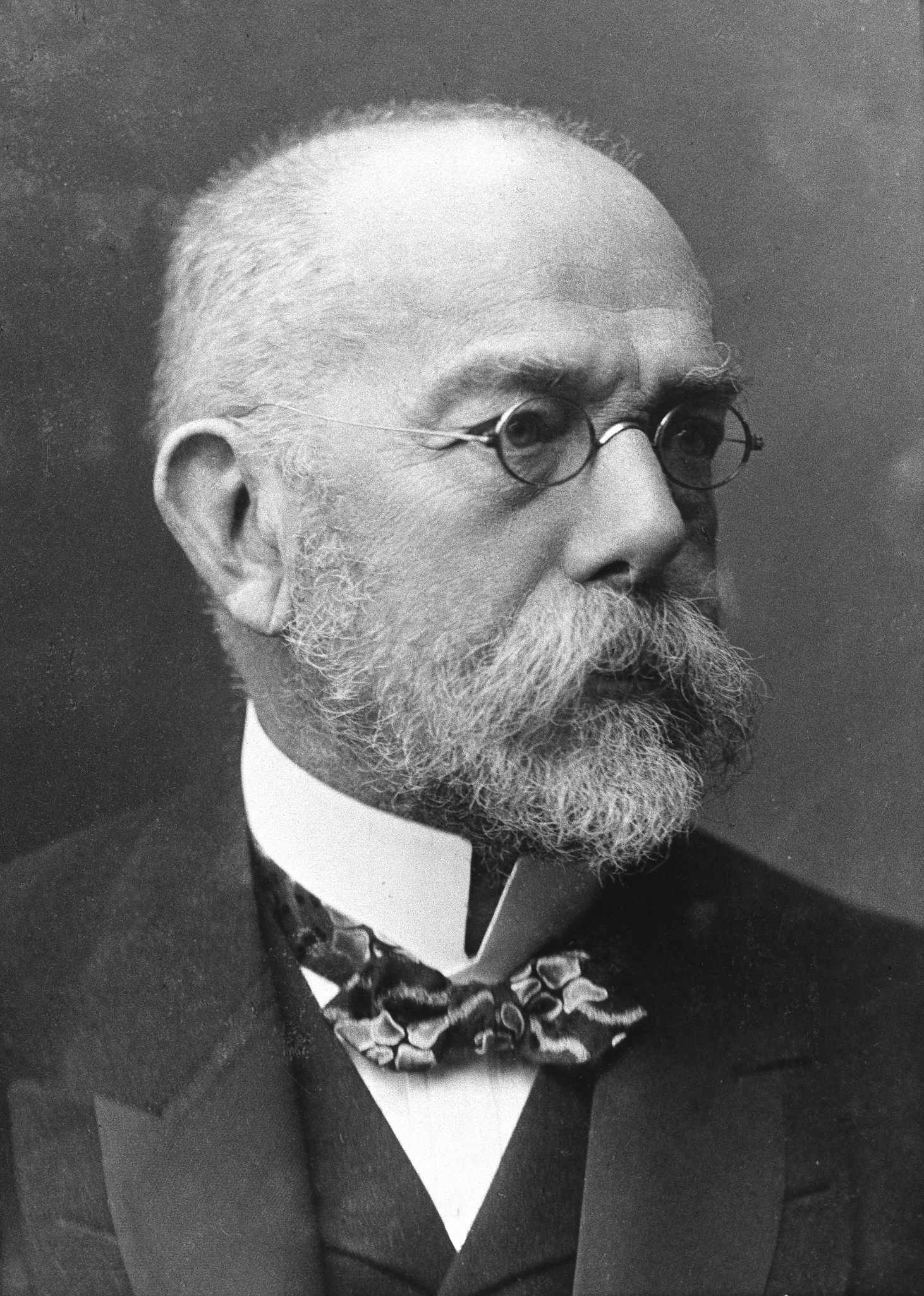
Image of Robert Koch, German microbiologist and developer of the modern streaking technique.

The modern streak plate method was developed in the 1880s from the efforts of Robert Koch and other microbiologists to obtain microbiological cultures of bacteria in order to study them. Prior to the adoption of streaking, pour plates were the common technique utilized by microbiologists to obtain pure strains. The dilution or isolation by streaking method was first developed in Koch's laboratory by his two assistants Friedrick Loeffler and Georg Theodor August Gaffky.

== Technique ==
Streaking is a rapid and simple process of microbe isolation through consecutive dilution. The technique is accomplished by reducing a comparatively large concentration of bacteria to a smaller concentration. The decrease of bacterial concentration should sufficiently spread apart colonies and allow for the separation of the different types of microbes in a sample. Streaking is done using a sterile tool and aseptic technique, such as a cotton swab or commonly an inoculation loop. If using a metal inoculation loop, it is first sterilized by passing it through a flame. When the loop is cool, it is dipped into an inoculum such as a microbial culture or patient specimen containing many species or a large quantity of bacteria. Aseptic techniques are used to maintain microbiological cultures and to prevent contamination of the growth medium.

Early examples of streaking moved in a single direction across the plate, as opposed to the back and forth "zig zag" technique preferred today. Many different methods have been developed to streak a plate. Picking a technique is a matter of individual preference and can also depend on how large the number of microbes the sample contains.

A plate showing the steps for the quadrant streaking technique.

The most common pattern used is Quadrant streaking, also called "four sectors streaking" and "four way streak method." This involves splitting the agar plate into four sections, or quadrants. To begin, a sterile loop starts in the first quadrant of a plate and moves in a back and forth motion multiple times across the agar surface going from the outside of the plate into the center. Once each previous quarter is completed, the plate is turned 90 degrees and a newly sterilized inoculation loop must be used. Starting from the bottom of the previous quadrant, the inoculation loop is pulled gently over half of the first quadrant's streaks before covering the next quarter. This process repeats sequentially moving through all four quadrants and will result in the final containing the most diluted section.

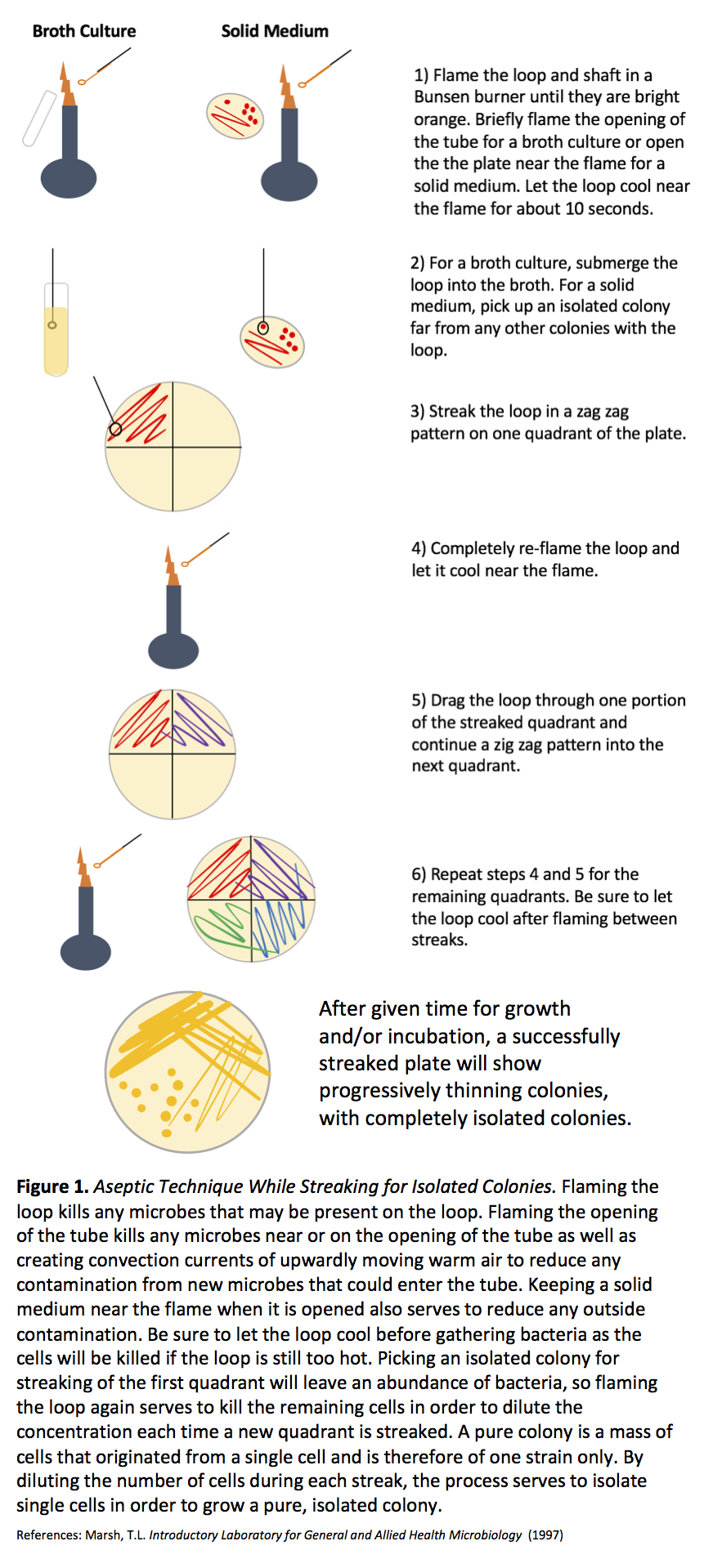
Illustration of streak plate procedure to achieve isolated colonies using aseptic technique.

The three-phase streaking pattern, also known as the T-Streak, is recommended for beginners. However, it is also limited in applications using greater than a single culture. The plate is split by drawing a "T" to create three separate sections. Rotate the plate so that the top of the "T" is furthest from your dominant hand. Starting from this first section a sterilized inoculation loop is dragged across the surface of the agar back and forth in a zigzag motion until approximately a third of the plate has been covered. The loop then is re-sterilized and the plate is turned 90 degrees. Starting in the previously streaked section, the loop is dragged through it two to three times continuing the zigzag pattern before moving to cover a second section. The procedure is then repeated once more, being cautious to not touch the previously streaked sectors. Each time the loop gathers fewer and fewer bacteria until it gathers just single bacterial cells that can grow into a colony. The plate should show the heaviest growth in the first section. The second section will have less growth and a few isolated colonies, while the final section will have the least amount of growth and many isolated colonies.

Illustration of the pattern used for a continuous streak technique.

For use in both dilutions and pure cultures, radiant streaking begins from streaking a small portion of agar on one side of the plate utilizing a sterile loop. Starting from the streaked section on the one side, make a set of vertical lines across the plate stretching to the other in a ray like pattern. Then switch to a new sterile inoculation loop and make horizontal lines crossing over the vertical as you go down the plate.

Continuous streaking is a method utilized to spread an even distribution of a sample across a plate for propagation, or increasing the size of the culture. It is implemented by starting from the outside and moving towards the inside of a plate in a single motion. This method is quick but only applicable for very diluted samples or in cases where a pure strain has already been achieved. In laboratories wishing to save material, a single plate can be divided into sections and a continuous streak used for a different material in each section. Allowing for a maximum number of samples to be streaked at one time.

Another continuous method is zig zag streaking and is also used to propagate culture samples. Starting from the side furthest from your dominant hand, move a sterilized loop back and forth across the plate. Use large motions across the entire width of the plate to cover the greatest area of the agar surface.

== Automated streaking ==
The primary goal of this technique is to obtain a pure sample by isolating a single type of microorganism from a mixed population. Professionals utilize the streak plate method to produce distinct, individual colonies on an agar surface. This process involves the dilution of the bacterial inoculum across the medium until the cells are spaced far enough apart to grow into isolated clusters. In order to achieve the best results, clinicians frequently employ the four-quadrant method. This involves rotating the petri dish and sterilizing the loop between sections, systematically thinning the concentration of bacteria. As soon as a single colony is picked and regrown, the culture is considered to be a pure microbiological culture, which is a fundamental requirement for precise subsequent testing. Integrating modern tracking into this process, such as Previ Isola (a standard automated system for sample inoculation and previous isolation tracking), is crucial. Utilizing these systems is beneficial because it standardizes the inoculation process, reducing human error and ensuring that bodily fluids are processed with high reproducibility. Although manual methods are traditional, research shows that automated streaking can increase the yield of isolated colonies and improve consistency compared to manual streaking methods. It is important to remember that the goal of this precision is identifying the microbe responsible for an infection, allowing targeted antibiotic treatment. One disadvantage of the manual streak plate is that it takes up a lot of time to master and execute. However, when comparing manual work to automated systems, while it may take the same amount of time to do the actual streaking, the consistency provided by automation often leads to fewer retakes. In the end, the streak plate remains the exemplar standard for separating complex mixtures into studyable components because without isolation there cannot be a definitive diagnosis.

== Growth medium ==
The plate upon which a sample will be streaked is a Petri dish containing a growth medium. Bacteria need different nutrients to grow. This includes water, a source of energy, sources of carbon, nitrogen, and additional minerals, growth factors, and other vitamins specific to the type of bacteria. A very common type of media used in microbiology labs is known as agar, a gelatinous substance derived from seaweed. The nutrient agar medium creates a sterile and transparent substance which can withstand the high temperatures of bacteria incubation while retaining its shape. Choice of which growth medium is used depends on which microorganism is being cultured, or selected for. Selective mediums can also be used for bacterial isolation. By adding an inhibitor such as an antibiotic into the growth medium, it can select against unwanted bacterial strains from growing on the plate.

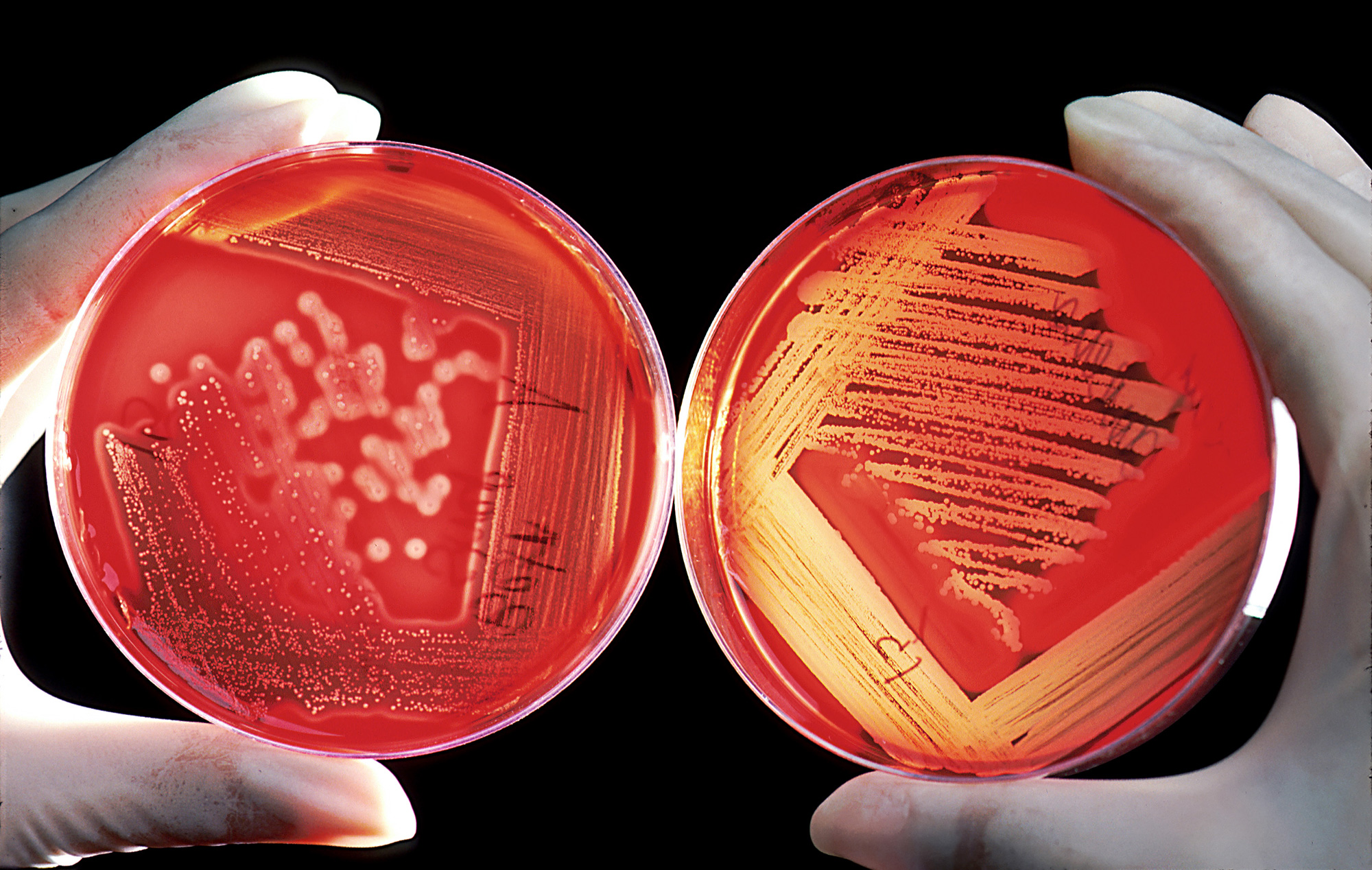
Different labs have different standards as to the direction and style of the streaking.

== Incubation ==
Dependent on the strain, the streaked plate may then be incubated, usually for 24 to 46 hours, to allow the bacteria to reproduce. Some strains of bacteria for example, the Bartonella species require longer periods of incubation due to slow growth rates. During incubation the plates are maintained at a constant temperature within the laboratory. Commonly the cultures are held at temperatures near 25 °C, standard room temperature. However, some microorganisms require incubation at different temperatures specific to their range of high growth rates and survival that must be accounted for. When setting up incubation, place the cover over the petri dish and turn the plate upside down, the portion with the streaked agar should serve as the top. This is done so any condensation that forms throughout the process will not fall onto the bacteria being grown. At the end of incubation there should be enough bacteria to form visible colonies in the areas touched by the inoculation loop. From these mixed colonies, single bacterial or fungal species can be identified based on their morphological (size/shape/color) differences. This can then be sub-cultured to a new media plate to yield a pure culture for further analysis.

== Importance ==
The use of streak plates to obtain pure cultures of bacteria is a technique utilized by a variety of scientific fields such as pathology, taxonomy and ecology. Bacteria within the environment frequently occur in mixed populations. To be able to study the infectious, morphological, and physiological characteristics of an individual species, the bacteria need to be isolated into genetically identical pure strains. Microbiology streaking is commonly employed in research of infectious disease. Streak plates allow for the analysis of antibiotic response and genome sequencing to analyze the individual genetic makeup of a strain. They are also utilized in the process of transformation, the manipulation of traits in bacteria by adding or removing specific genes.

== See also ==
- Bacterial lawn
