= Cell spreader =

Laboratory tool for bacteria

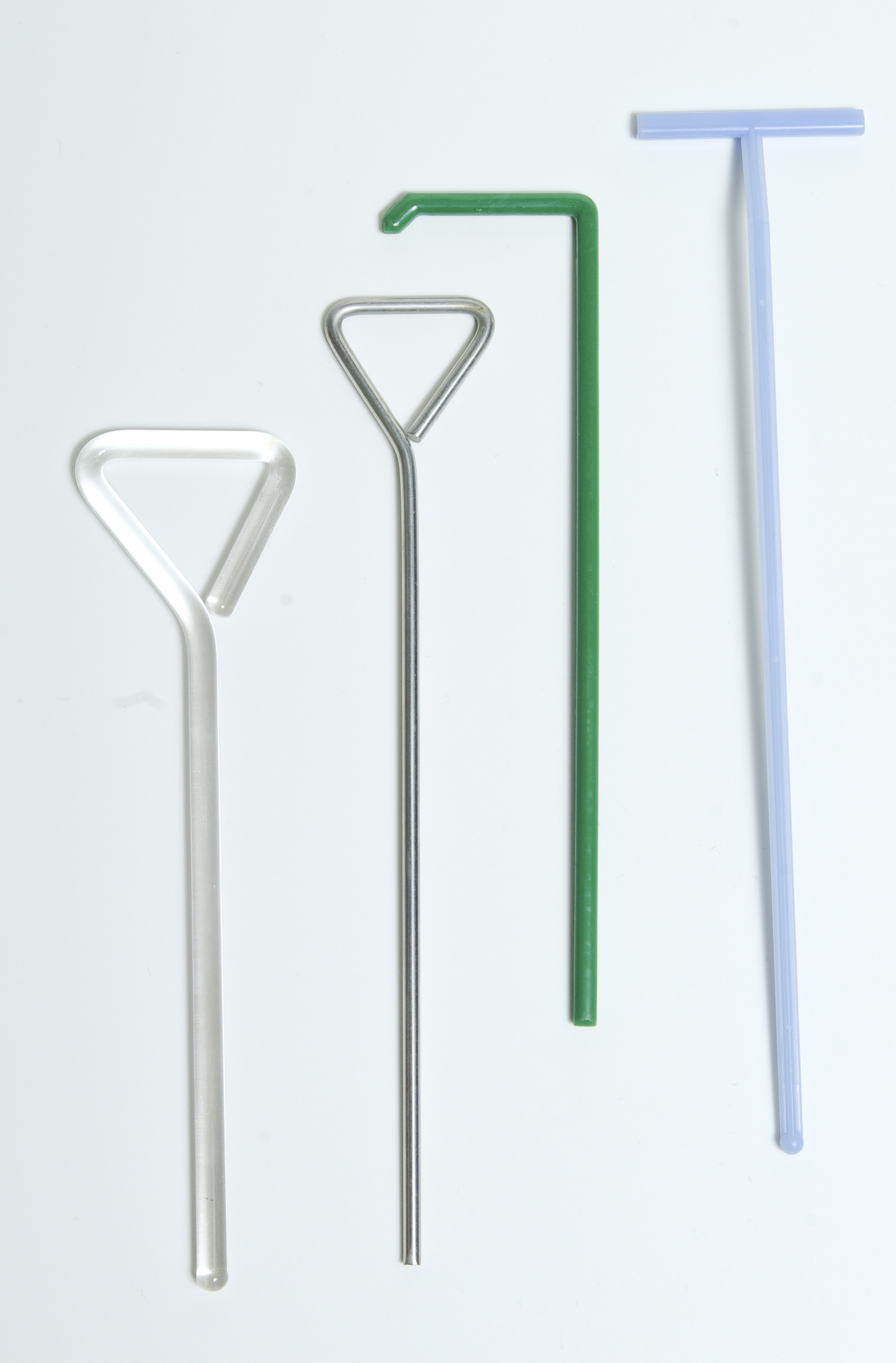
Cell spreaders

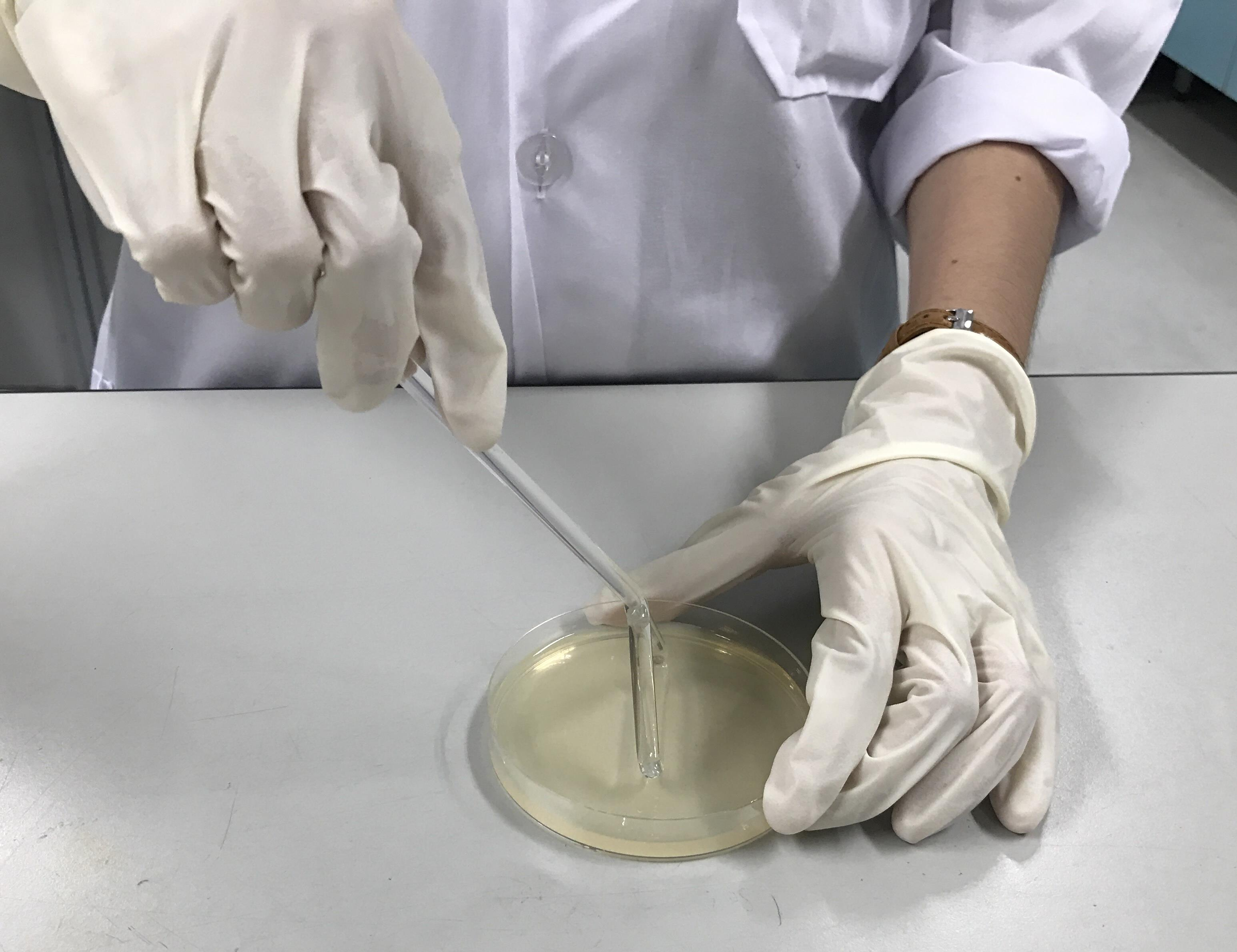
Uses of a cell spreader

Cell spreader demonstration

In microbiology, a cell spreader or plate spreader is a tool used to smoothly spread cells and bacteria on a culture plate, such as a petri dish. Cell spreaders can be made from glass, plastic, or metal, and come in various shapes.

A Drigalski spatula is a cell spreader consisting of a cylindrical rod or wire bent in the shape of a triangle with a handle. Another variant is a rod bent in L-shape. Extrusion molded versions can be T-shaped.

== Uses ==
Drop cells or bacteria at the center of the dish. Researchers can then place the spreader on top of the dish and, without applying much pressure, swirl the spreader around on the dish to evenly distribute the cells or bacteria.

=== Sterilization ===
Before using a cell spreader, if the spreader is made from glass or metal, researchers must sterilize the spreader by submerging it in alcohol or ethanol and later burning the alcohol off by placing the spreader in a Bunsen burner flame to eliminate microorganisms.

After each use, the spreader should be placed in alcohol or ethanol to keep it clean and prevent it from being contaminated with unwanted particles.

Disposable cell spreaders made of plastic are usually not subject to sterilization, but discarded.

== See also ==
- Inoculation loop
- Ball inoculator
