= Streak plate =

Streak plate may refer to:

- In streaking (microbiology), the plate used to incubate a culture and isolate a pure strain
- In streak (mineralogy), the plate used to produce the powder of a mineral
