= Spiral plater =

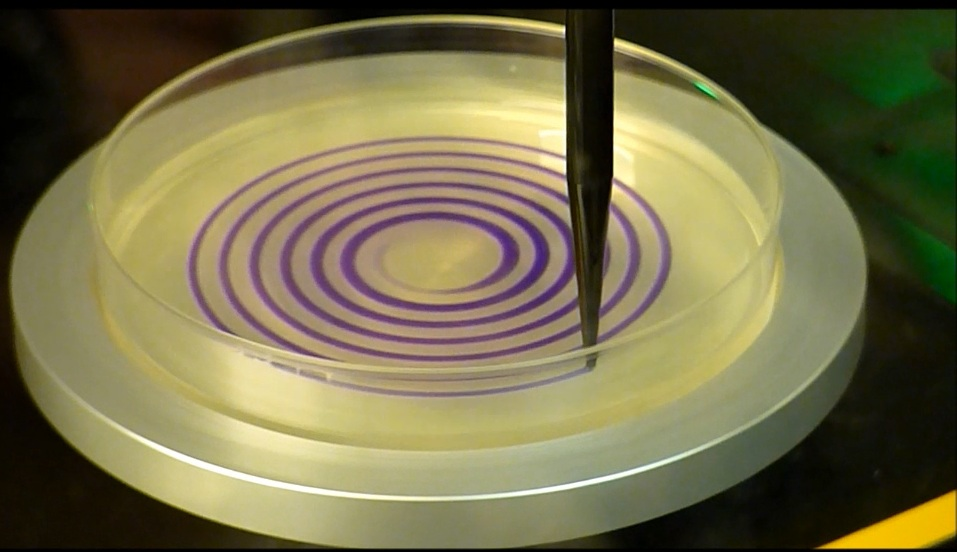
A photograph of a Petri dish with a spiral pattern dispensed using an integrated spiral plater on a Tecan robot. The media used was a purple color to illustrate the resulting pattern, normally a transparent media would be used.

A spiral plater is an instrument used to dispense a liquid sample onto a Petri dish in a spiral pattern. Commonly used as part of a CFU count procedure for the purpose of determining the number of microbes in the sample. In this setting, after spiral plating, the Petri dish is incubated for several hours after which the number of colony forming microbes (CFU) is determined. Spiral platers are also used for research, clinical diagnostics and as a method for covering a Petri dish with bacteria before placing antibiotic discs for AST.

== Mode of action ==
The spiral plater rotates the dish while simultaneously dispensing the liquid and either linearly moving the dish or the dispensing tip. This creates the common spiral pattern. If all movements are done in constant speed, the spiral created would have a lower concentration on the outside of the plate than on the inside. More advanced spiral platers provide different options for spiral patterns such as constant concentration (by slowing down the spinning and / or the lateral movements) or exponential concentration (by speeding up the spinning and / or the lateral movements).

== In food and cosmetic testing ==
Spiral plating is used extensively for microbiological testing of food, milk and milk products and cosmetics. It is an approved method by the FDA. The advantage of spiral plating is less plates used versus plating manually because different concentrations are present on each plate. This also makes it harder to count the colonies and requires special techniques and equipment.

== Stand-alone vs. Add-on ==
Spiral platers are either available as stand-alone instruments that are fed manually with plates and samples or fed automatically using dedicated stackers. Alternatively spiral platers are available as integrated devices as part of larger automated platforms. In this case a larger workflow is often automated, e.g. plating, incubation and counting.
