= Drigalski spatula =

Cell spreader

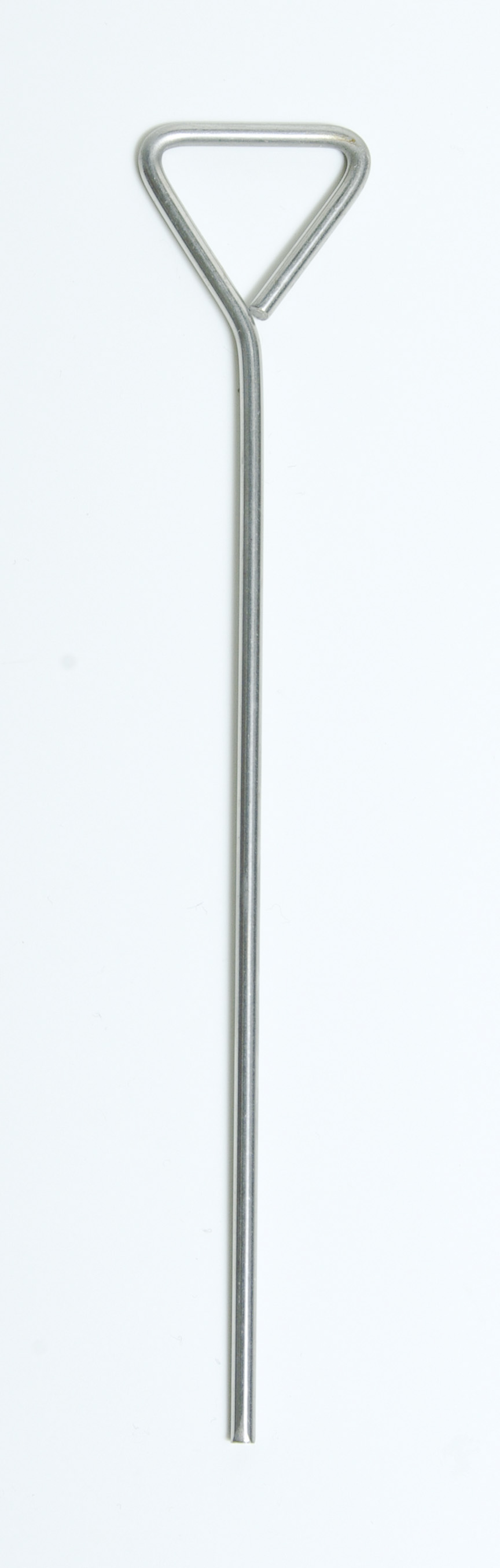
Metal

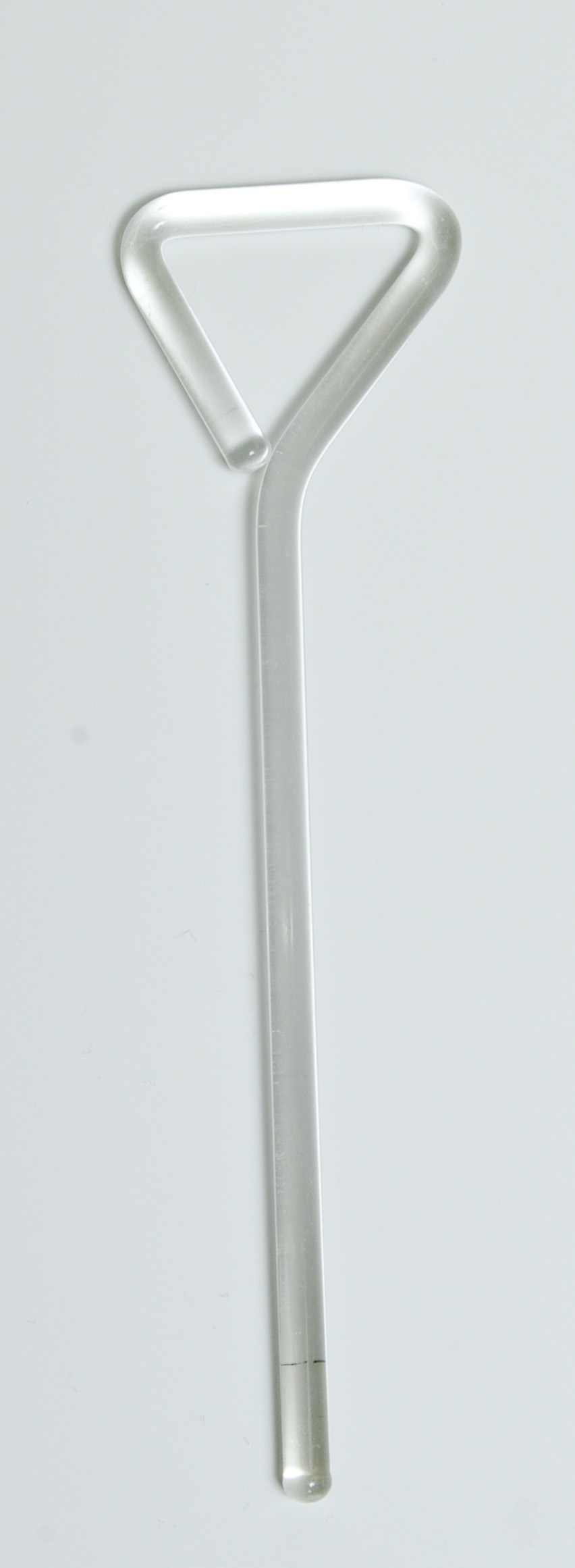
Glass

Drigalski spatulas

A Drigalski spatula is a type of cell spreader consisting of a cylindrical rod or wire, usually of metal or glass, bent in the shape of a triangle with a handle.

The tool is named after German bacteriologist Wilhelm von Drigalski (1871-1950).
