= Miles and Misra method =

The Miles and Misra Method (or surface viable count) is a technique used in Microbiology to determine the number of colony forming units in a bacterial suspension or homogenate. The technique was first described in 1938 by Miles, Misra and Irwin who at the time were working at the LSHTM. The Miles and Misra method has been shown to be precise.

Materials

- A calibrated dropping pipette, or automatic pipette, delivering drops of 20μl.
- Petri dishes containing nutrient agar or other appropriate medium.
- Phosphate Buffered Saline (PBS) or other appropriate diluent.
- Bacterial suspension or homogenate.

Method

- The inoculum / suspension is serially diluted by adding 1x of suspension to 9x of diluent. When the quantity of bacteria is unknown, dilutions should be made to at least 10^{−8}.
- Three plates are needed for each dilution series, for statistical reasons an average of at least 3 counts are needed.
- The surface of the plates need to be sufficiently dry to allow a 20μl drop to be absorbed in 15–20 minutes.
- Plates are divided into equal sectors (it is possible to use up to 8 per plate). The sectors are labelled with the dilutions.
- In each sector, 1 x 20 μl of the appropriate dilution is dropped onto the surface of the agar and the drop allowed to spread naturally. In the original description of the method a drop from a height of 2.5 cm spread over an area of 1.5-2.0 cm. It is important to avoid touching the surface of the agar with the pipette.
- The plates are left upright on the bench to dry before inversion and incubation at 37 °C for 18 – 24 hours (or appropriate incubation conditions considering the organism and agar used).
- Each sector is observed for growth, high concentrations will give a confluent growth over the area of the drop, or a large number of small/merged colonies. Colonies are counted in the sector where the highest number of full-size discrete colonies can be seen (usually sectors containing between 2-20 colonies are counted).
- The following equation is used to calculate the number of colony forming units (CFU) per ml from the original aliquot / sample:

CFU per ml = (Average number of colonies for a dilution / 0.02) x dilution factor.

Advantages

- Faster than other methods.
- Produce less bacterial contamination of the working surface.

== See also ==
- Colony-forming unit
