= Gas-pak =

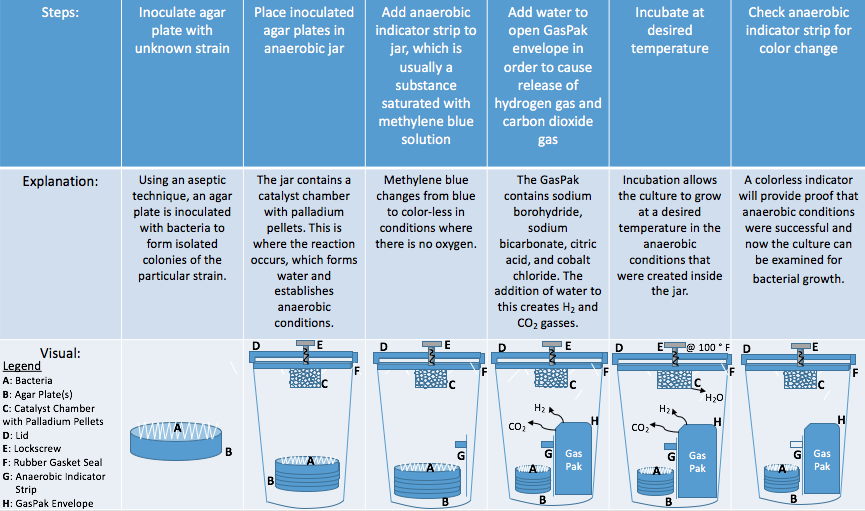
This table displays the steps involved in using a GasPak to create a completely anaerobic environment for incubating an inoculated agar plate. After inoculating the agar plate(s) with bacteria under aseptic conditions, the agar plates are placed in an anaerobic jar that contains components, like the catalyst chamber, that will help facilitate the reaction to eliminate free oxygen and provide completely anaerobic conditions. The methylene blue strip is an indicator that is placed in the jar that will turn colorless under entirely anaerobic conditions, which provides proof that the jar was able to successfully reach an anaerobic state. The components of the GasPak envelope along with the addition of water, allow for the start of the reaction that takes place in the catalyst chamber. The sealed anaerobic jar is then incubated at a desired temperature to allow growth of the bacteria. In the above figure for example, the incubation occurred at 100 °F (38 °C). A colorless indicator strip provides proof that the anaerobic conditions were met and the agar plates can now be observed for bacterial growth.

Gas-pak is a method used in the production of an anaerobic environment. It is used to culture bacteria which die or fail to grow in the presence of oxygen (anaerobes).

These are commercially available, disposable sachets containing a dry powder or pellets, which, when mixed with water and kept in an appropriately sized airtight jar, produce an atmosphere free of elemental oxygen gas (O_{2}). They are used to produce an anaerobic culture in microbiology. It is a much simpler technique than the McIntosh and Filde's anaerobic jar where one needs to pump gases in and out.

== Constituents of gas-pak sachets ==
1. Sodium borohydride - NaBH_{4}
2. Sodium bicarbonate - NaHCO_{3}
3. Citric acid - C_{3}H_{5}O(COOH)_{3}
4. Cobalt chloride - CoCl_{2} (catalyst)

The addition of a Dicot Catalyst may be required to initiate the reaction.

== Reactions ==
- NaBH_{4} + 2 H_{2}O = NaBO_{2} + 4 H_{2}↑
- C_{3}H_{5}O(COOH)_{3} + 3 NaHCO_{3} + [CoCl_{2}] = C_{3}H_{5}O(COONa)_{3} + 3 CO_{2} + 3 H_{2} + [CoCl_{2}]
- 2 H_{2} + O_{2} + [Catalyst] = 2 H_{2}O + [Catalyst]

== Consumption of oxygen ==
These chemicals react with water to produce hydrogen and carbon dioxide along with sodium citrate (C_{3}H_{5}O(COONa)_{3}) and water as byproducts . Again, hydrogen and oxygen reacting on a catalyst like Palladiumised alumina (supplied separately) combine to form water.

== Culture method ==
The medium, the gas-pak sachet (opened and with water added) and an indicator are placed in an air-tight gas jar which is incubated at the desired temperature. The indicator tells whether the environment was indeed oxygen free or not.

The chemical indicator generally used for this purpose is "chemical methylene blue solution" that since synthesis has never been exposed to elemental oxygen. It is colored deep blue on oxidation in presence of atmospheric oxygen in the jar, but will become colorless when oxygen is gone, and anaerobic conditions are achieved.
