= Culture plate =

Low flat-bottomed container for growing microbes

In microbiology, a culture plate is a low flat-bottomed laboratory container for growing a layer of organisms such as bacteria, molds, and cells on a thin layer of nutrient medium. The most common types are the petri dish and multiwell plates.

Multiwell culture plates	Penicillium mold colonies in a Petri dish

== See also ==
- Roux culture bottle
- Inoculation loop
- Test tube
