= Viable count =

Method used to determine number of living cells in a cell culture

Viable count is a method used in cell culture to determine the number of living cells in a culture. This is different from other cell counting techniques because it makes a distinction between live and dead cells.

== Method ==
A dilution of the cells to be counted is prepared and mixed with Trypan blue, this is normally the stain of choice because it is taken up by dead cells and actively excluded from live cells. Once the cells have been stained, they are counted using a hemocytometer, then a calculation is carried out to the original concentration of live cells.

== Use in Cell Culture ==
Determining the viable cell count is important for calculating dilutions required for the passaging of cells, as well as determining the size and number of flasks needed during growth time. It is also vital when seeding plates for assays, such as the plaque assay, because the plates need a known number of live replicating cells for the virus to attach to and replicate in, in order to get an accurate result.
