= Viral disease testing =

Viral disease testing is the use of a variety of testing techniques for a variety of purposes, including diagnosing conditions, assessing immunity and understanding disease prevalence. The primary approaches include DNA/RNA tests, serological tests and antigen tests.

== History ==
=== COVID-19 ===
In March 2020, Abbott received emergency use authorization (EUA) for its isothermal nucleic acid test for COVID-19. It produces test results in 5 minutes using its ID NOW portable testing system. It also received EUA for its m2000-based laboratory nucleic acid test for COVID-19.

In April 2020, Abbott received EUA for its ARCHITECT IgG laboratory antibody test for COVID-19. Also in April, Abbott's ID NOW test was reported to have sensitivity of 85.2%. A later study found sensitivity of only 52%, inducing the FDA to issue an alert. A different study found sensitivity of 91%. The UK spent $20 million for antibody tests that proved flawed.

In May 2020, a rapid antigen test from Quidel Corporation received EUA for detecting SARS-CoV-2. Test results were said to be available at point of care within 15 minutes. Sensitivity is 85%. Also in May 2020, a CRISPR genetic test was approved for emergency use that claimed 100% selectivity and 97.5% sensitivity. That month Abbott received EUA for its Alinity antibody test for COVID-19. The company claimed 100% sensitivity and 99.6% specificity for patients tested 14 days after symptoms began. Another review found that the accuracy of PCR tests depended on the interval between the infection and the test. Immediately after infection, the sensitivity was 0, rising to 80% after three days and then declining thereafter.

In May 2020 the FDA withdrew approval for 29 of 41 antibody tests for which it had given EUAs.

== Types ==
=== DNA/RNA tests ===
Tests for viral DNA can look for either DNA or RNA. They typically use reverse transcriptase polymerase chain reactions to multiply the amount of genetic material in a small sample into an amount that is measurable. The genetic material is generally taken from the nose/sinus. One study found clinical sensitivity was found to range from 66 to 80%. Another found accuracy of 70%.

A newer form uses CRISPR to produce a test result without requiring lab equipment. The test reacts with genetic material to produce a visible signal without requiring amplification.

=== Serological tests ===
Serological tests look for the presence of antibodies in a test sample. Antibodies are materials that the body produces to fight off an infection. The primary antibodies sought in viral testing are IgE and IgG.

=== Rapid antigen tests ===
A rapid antigen test quickly searches for antigens, protein fragments that are found on the surface of or within a virus. Antigen tests can be analyzed within a few minutes. Antigen tests are less accurate than PCR tests. It has a low false positive rate, but a higher false negative rate. A negative test result may require confirmation with a PCR test. Advocates claim that antigen tests are less expensive and can be scaled up more rapidly than PCR tests. Antigen tests are available for a variety of conditions, including streptococcus, influenza, giardia, Ebola and Helicobacter pylori. Antigens can be detected via blood, urine or stool.

=== Imaging ===
Imaging such as computerized tomography can be used to inform a diagnostic process. CT scans are considerably more expensive than nucleic acid tests and involve a small dose of radiation. For COVID-19, they are seen as the most accurate diagnostic tool, because the disease creates patchy "ground glass" areas in the lungs that are revealed by a scan. One study found 97% sensitivity.

== Accuracy ==
Accuracy is measured in terms of specificity and selectivity. Test errors can come false positives (the test is positive, but the virus is not present) or false negatives (the test is negative, but the virus is present).

=== Sensitivity ===
Sensitivity indicates whether the test accurately identifies whether the virus is or is not present. A 90% sensitive test will correctly identify 90% of infections, leaving 10% with a false negative result.

=== Specificity ===
Specificity indicates how well-targeted the test is to the virus in question. Highly specific tests pick up only the virus in question. Non-selective tests pick up other viruses as well. A 90% specific test will correctly identify 90% of those who are uninfected, leaving 10% with a false positive result.

== See also ==
- H1N1
- MERS
- SARS
