= Most probable number =

Microbiological method for quantification of microorganism growth

The most probable number method, otherwise known as the method of Poisson zeroes, is a method of getting quantitative data on concentrations of discrete items from positive/negative (incidence) data.

== Purpose ==
There are many discrete entities that are easily detected but difficult to count. Any sort of amplification reaction or catalysis reaction obliterates easy quantification but allows presence to be detected very sensitively. Common examples include microorganism growth, enzyme action, or catalytic chemistry. The MPN method involves taking the original solution or sample, and subdividing it by orders of magnitude (frequently 10× or 2×), and assessing presence/absence in multiple subdivisions.

The degree of dilution at which absence begins to appear indicates that the items have been diluted so much that there are many subsamples in which none appear. A suite of replicates at any given concentration allow finer resolution, to use the number of positive and negative samples to estimate the original concentration within the appropriate order of magnitude.

== Applications ==
In microbiology, the cultures are incubated and assessed by eye, bypassing tedious colony counting or expensive and tedious microscopic counts. Presumptive, confirmative and completed tests are a part of MPN.

In molecular biology, a common application involves DNA templates diluted into polymerase chain reactions (PCR). Reactions only proceed when a template is present, allowing for a form of quantitative PCR, to assess the original concentration of template molecules. Another application involves diluting enzyme stocks into solution containing a chromogenic substrate, or diluting antigens into solutions for ELISA (Enzyme-Linked ImmunoSorbent Assay) or some other antibody cascade detection reaction, to measure the original concentration of the enzyme or antigen.

== Weakness and importance ==
The major weakness of MPN methods is the need for large numbers of replicates at the appropriate dilution to narrow the confidence intervals. However, it is a very important method for counts when the appropriate order of magnitude is unknown a priori and sampling is necessarily destructive.

== See also ==
- Dilution assay
