= Wilhelm von Drigalski =

German bacteriologist (1871–1950)

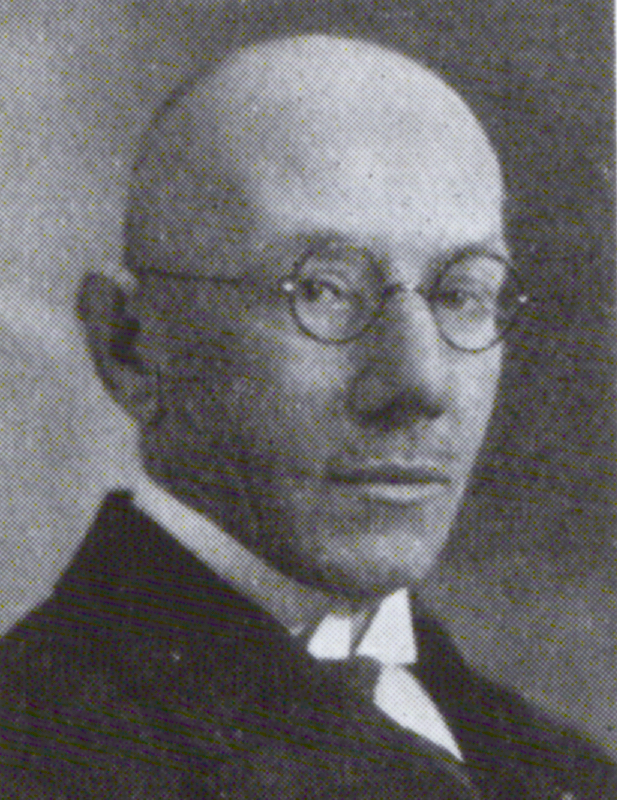

Wilhelm von Drigalski (born 21 June 1871 in Dresden - died 12 May 1950 in Wiesbaden) was a German bacteriologist. Von Drigalski was awarded a doctor of medicine degree at the University of Berlin in 1895. As medical officer he worked at the Charité hospital under the supervision of Robert Koch. He married the writer Liesbet Dill, daughter of the Dudweiler estate and brewery owner Friedrich Wilhelm Dill and Elisabeth Dill née Bottler, in Wiesbaden on March 5, 1905, and fathered their daughter Leonore (b. 1912) and son Wolfgang von Drigalski (1907-1943).
