= Cragie tube =

Method for determining bacterial motility

The Cragie tube or Craigie tube is a method used in microbiology for determining bacterial motility.

== Technique ==
A hollow tube with some culture medium is placed in semi-solid agar inside a bottle. A sample of the bacterium to be tested is inoculated into the medium in the hollow tube and the setup is incubated at 37 °C overnight.

== Observation ==
On examining the areas where bacterial growth has occurred there are several observations to be made:

- the colonies of the non-motile bacteria remain confined within the tube at the site of inoculation
- the motile bacteria swim out from the bottom of the tube and colonize the surrounding medium as well

Confirmation may be obtained by subculture and retesting.

== See also ==
- Kauffman-White classification
