= Egyptian egg oven =

Oven/incubator for hatching eggs

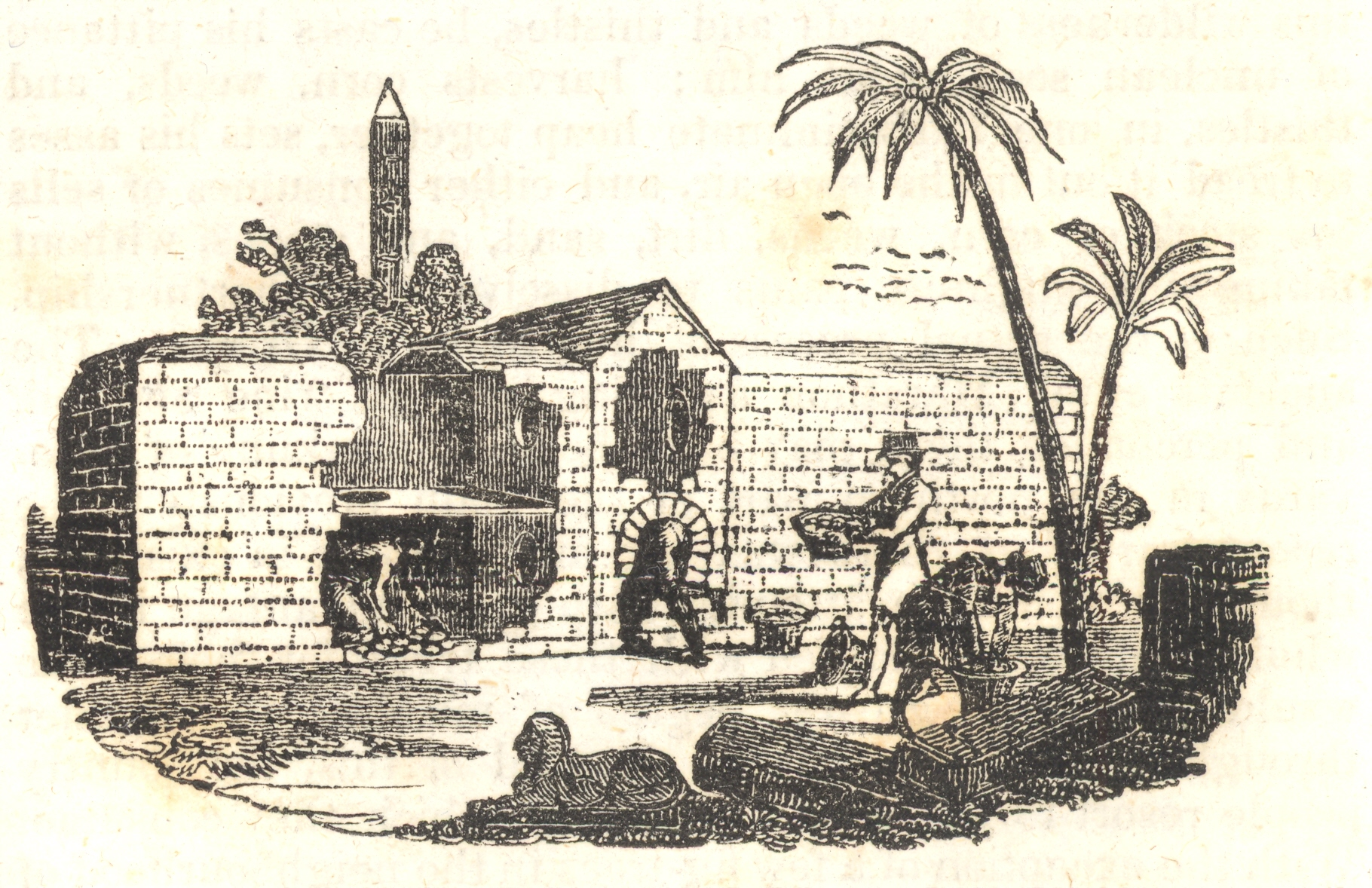
Egyptian egg oven

An Egyptian egg oven or Egyptian mamal is an oven for hatching eggs by incubation using artificial heat.

== History ==
Manmade hatching ovens in Egypt date back to the 4th century BC. Although using old processing methods, they were considered effective at hatching chickens, especially in comparison to other techniques of the time.

Egyptian egg ovens are typically brick structures, often created from mud. In Egypt, the ovens varied in size depending on the area served, with the largest having a capacity of 80,000 eggs. Bricks of cow or camel dung fueled the incubators, burning in the upper cells and emitting heat to the lower cells. Heat was regulated with openings between the stories, and in the outer domes. Eggs were arranged in the lower cells. Operators would also need to periodically turn the eggs, to avoid deformities in the chicks. An assessment of their internal heat would be done by pressing an egg to the eyelids.

Arnold von Harff mentioned the ovens in the 1490s. He was awed by how, in consequence of the great supply, merchants can sell chicks by the volume of a vessel, disregarding the exact number. He also transmitted a joke, that in the whole of Cairo there is only one cock, and 24 hens, not unlike the Sultan.

Jean de Thévenot visited an oven in Cairo in 1657, and described its structure and scale of operation. He noted only Copts work there. In the 1670s Johann Michael Wansleben added that the good eggs were sorted from dead ones, by inspection against a sun-beam, at day 14 of the incubation. He denied that chicks are sold by the measure.

Claude Sicard, in the early 18th century, wrote further on the economics of the ovens. He explained that the operation is a trade secret, of the village of Birma in the delta, passed down from generation to generation. Each year, three to four-hundred people of the village ("Bremeans"), would purchase a license from the Agha of Birma, and go about all parts of Egypt, to construct ovens and operate them. A local entrepreneur would pay their wage. This was their occupation in the spring and winter, as the heat of other seasons might disrupt the mild temperature preserved in the ovens. Throughout Egypt, local villagers were assigned to a regional oven, and were obliged by the local authorities to sell the Bremean with their eggs. They were guaranteed to receive chicks based on a 2/3 hatching success rate. Any chicks hatched in excess of this rate, the operator would sell to the entrepreneur. Dead and unfit chicks were culled and used as feed for poultry.

In 1750, French naturalist René Antoine Ferchault de Réaumur published a detailed report of the ovens, and declared that "Egypt ought to be prouder of them than her pyramids."

The book Egypt: Familiar Description of the Land, People and Produce published in 1839 placed the number of egg-ovens at 450, and noted that the Egyptian government generated significant revenue through a heavy tax on the poultry farmers.

An 1895 report from the American Consul in Egypt stated there were "150 egg-ovens, each with a hatching capacity of 300,000 each season". The report also stated the importance of the poultry industry in Egypt.

In the 1910s it was reported that Egyptian poultry farmers used these incubators to produce over 90,000,000 chickens per year.

In 2009 the Food and Agriculture Organization published a survey of the traditional hatcheries in three of the Governorates of Egypt, in an attempt to assess risks of Avian influenza in the country.

== See also ==
- Ancient Egyptian agriculture
- Fayoumi
