= Roux culture bottle =

Type of laboratory glassware

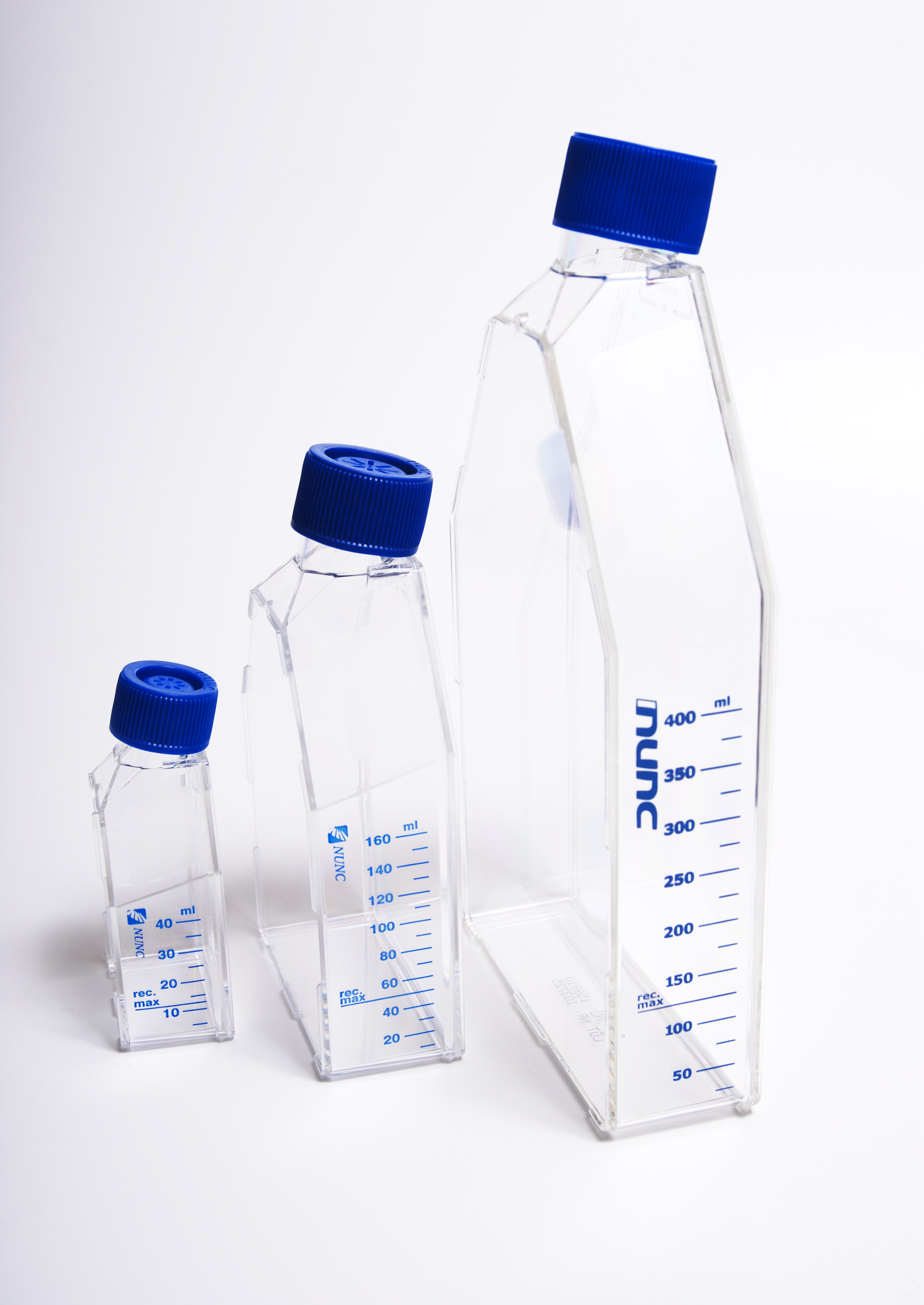
Plastic Roux bottles.

A Roux culture bottle, or simply Roux bottle, is a type of laboratory glassware used in biology and related sciences to grow microorganisms or tissue cells. It consists of a bottle of transparent glass or plastic with two closely spaced flat, rectangular, parallel faces and a short neck; of such a design that the bottle can be laid down sideways, on one of those two faces, even when unstoppered and partially filled with a culture medium. This goal is achieved by having the neck narrowed, offset, partially blocked, or canted (tilted). The item is also generically called cell culture bottle or tissue culture (TC) bottle, and flask may be used instead of "bottle".

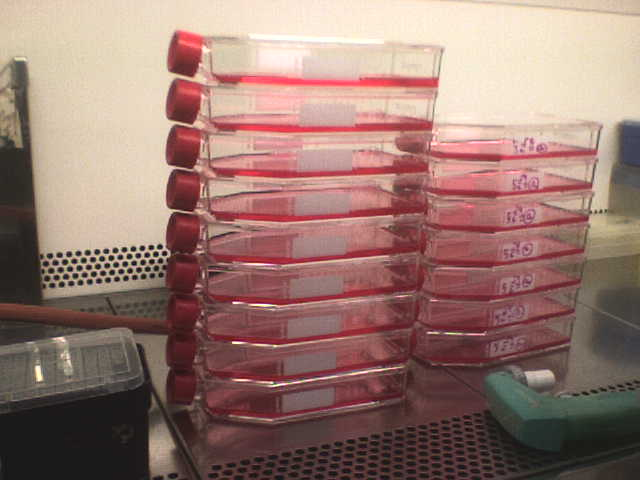
Pile of Roux bottles with culture medium.

A Roux bottle provides a large surface for the cells or microorganisms to grow, whether on the top of, floating in, or at the bottom of the medium. The flat upper face then allows inspection of the culture and even illumination for photosynthetic organisms. Organisms growing at the bottom of the medium can also be inspected from below, with an inverted microscope.

The bottle is typically closed with a plug or cap that prevents contamination of the culture by spores from the outside, while still allowing exchange of gases generated or consumed by the organisms inside.

The bottle's invention has been attributed to French physician and Pasteur's collaborator Pierre Roux (1853-1933).

== Variations ==
The "DeLong" type has a horizontal neck with a low barrier at the base. There is a cylindrical version that is meant to be slowly tuned on rollers to keep the contents well mixed.

== See also ==
- Petri dish
