= McIntosh and Fildes' anaerobic jar =

Microbiology equipment

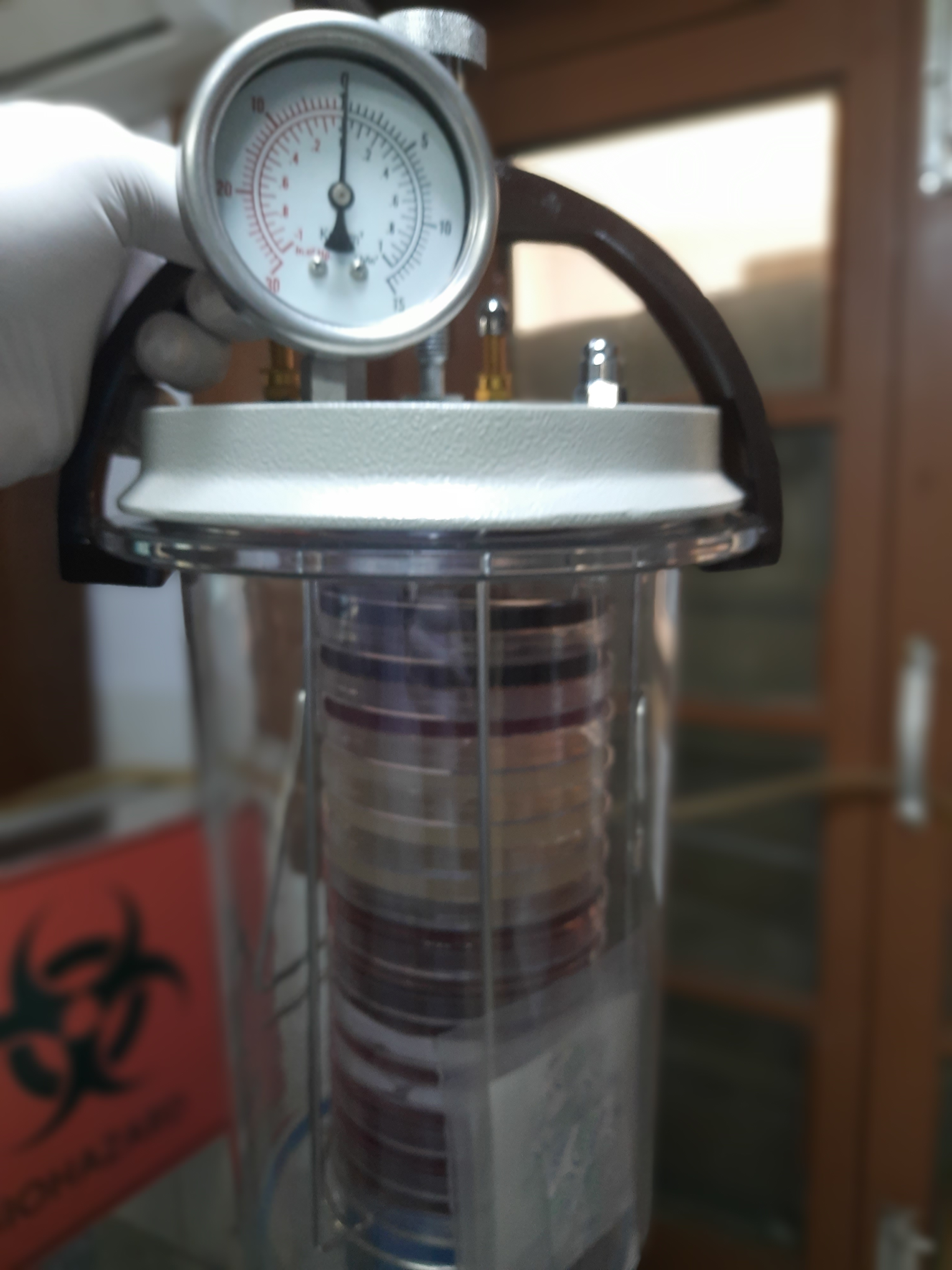
- Uses: Production of an anaerobic environment
- Inventor: Paul Fildes and James McIntosh

McIntosh and Fildes' anaerobic jar is an instrument used in the production of an anaerobic environment. This method of anaerobiosis as others is used to culture bacteria and other germs (e.g., Trichomonas vaginalis) which die or fail to grow in presence of oxygen (strict anaerobes). It was originally introduced by James McIntosh, Paul Fildes and William Bulloch in 1916. McIntosh and Fildes, after whom the device has been named, published an improved version in 1921.

== Construction ==
The jar, about 20 by 12.5 inches (510 mm × 320 mm) is made of metal. Its parts are as follows:

1. The body made up of metal (airtight)
2. The lid, also metal can be placed in an airtight fashion
3. A screw going through a curved metal strip to secure and hold the lid in place
4. A thermometer to measuring the internal temperature
5. A pressure gauge to measuring the internal pressure (or a side tube is attached to a manometer)
6. Another side tube for evacuation and introduction of gases (to a gas cylinder or a vacuum pump)
7. A wire cage hanging from the lid to hold a catalyst that makes hydrogen react to oxygen without the need of any ignition source

== Method of use ==
- First:
1. The culture: The culture media are placed inside the jar, stacked up one on the other, and
2. Indicator system: Pseudomonas aeruginosa, inoculated on to a nutrient agar plate is kept inside the jar along with the other plates. This bacteria need oxygen to grow (aerobic). A growth free culture plate at the end of the process indicates a successful anaerobiosis. However, P. aeruginosa possesses a denitrification pathway. If nitrate is present in the media, P. aeruginosa may still grow under anaerobic conditions.
- Second: 6/7ths of the air inside is pumped out and replaced with either unmixed Hydrogen or as a 10%CO_{2}+90%H_{2} mixture. The catalyst (palladium) acts and the oxygen is used up in forming water with the hydrogen. The manometer registers this as a fall in the internal pressure of the jar.
- Third: Hydrogen is pumped in to fill up the jar so that the pressure inside equals atmospheric pressure. The jar is now incubated at desired temperature settings.
