= Inoculation loop =

Tool used by microbiologists

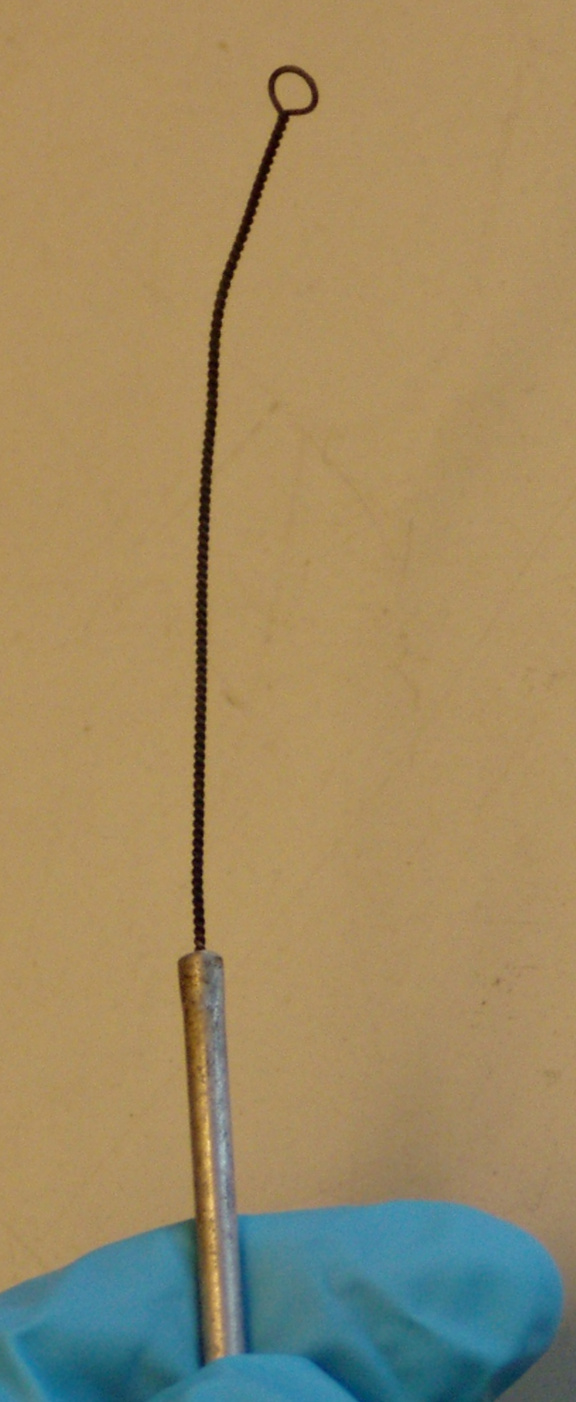
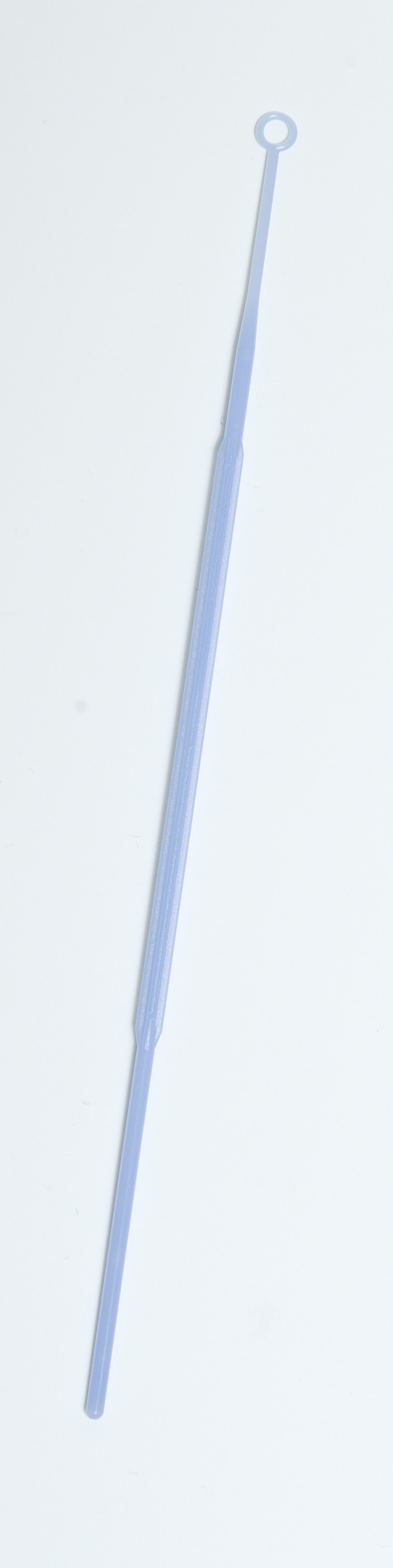
Inoculation loops

An inoculation loop (also called a smear loop, inoculation wand or microstreaker) is a simple tool used mainly by microbiologists to pick up and transfer a small sample of microorganisms called inoculum from a microbial culture or specimen, e.g. for streaking on a culture plate. This process is called inoculation.

Inoculation may be quantitative or nonquantitative. When the amount of viable microbes in a given volume is important (e.g. for cultures of urine or bronchoscopy fluid), a calibrated loop is used to spread a specific volume of sample across a culture plate. Otherwise, microbiologists can inoculate cultures using non-calibrated loops.

The tool consists of a thin handle with a loop about 5 mm wide or smaller at the end. Earlier versions were originally made of twisted metal wire (such as platinum, tungsten or nichrome), but disposable molded plastic versions are now common. The size of the loop determines the volume of liquid an inoculation loop can transfer. An early report of the use of an inoculation loop as an analytical tool was by O'Sullivan et al. in a 1960 published protocol developed to improve methods for culturing urine samples. A 3mm diameter loop was used to deliver a consistent volume of urine for analysis. Inoculation loops are described by volume (typically ranging from 1-10 microliters). For some applications, pipettes may be preferred to inoculation loops as more reliable tools to deliver small, precise volumes of liquid.

== See also ==
- Cell spreader
- Micropipette
