= Incubator (culture) =

Device used to grow and maintain microbiological cultures or cell cultures

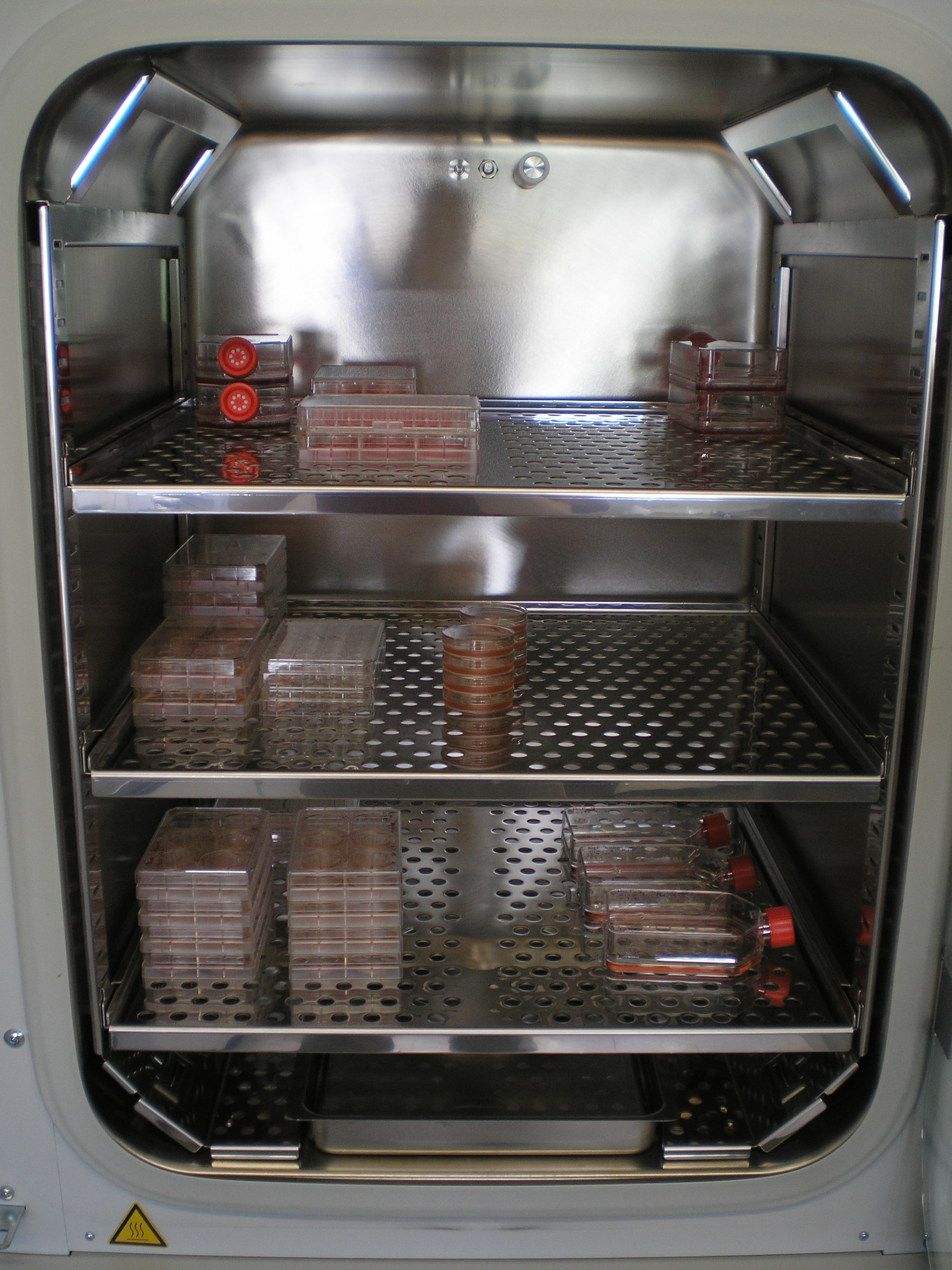
Interior of a CO_{2} incubator used in cell culture

An incubator is a device used to grow and maintain microbiological cultures or cell cultures. The incubator maintains optimal temperature, humidity and other conditions such as the CO_{2} and oxygen content of the atmosphere inside. Incubators are essential for much experimental work in cell biology, microbiology and molecular biology and are used to culture both bacterial and eukaryotic cells.

An incubator is made up of a chamber with a regulated temperature. Some incubators also regulate humidity, gas composition, or ventilation within that chamber.

The simplest incubators are insulated boxes with an adjustable heater, typically going up to 60 to 65 °C (140 to 149 °F), though some can go slightly higher (generally to no more than 100 °C). The most commonly used temperature both for bacteria such as the frequently used E. coli as well as for mammalian cells is approximately 37 °C (99 °F), as these organisms grow well under such conditions. For other organisms used in biological experiments, such as the budding yeast Saccharomyces cerevisiae, a growth temperature of 30 °C (86 °F) is optimal.

More elaborate incubators can also include the ability to lower the temperature (via refrigeration), or the ability to control humidity or CO_{2} levels. This is important in the cultivation of mammalian cells, where the relative humidity is typically >80% to prevent evaporation and a slightly acidic pH is achieved by maintaining a CO_{2} level of 5%.

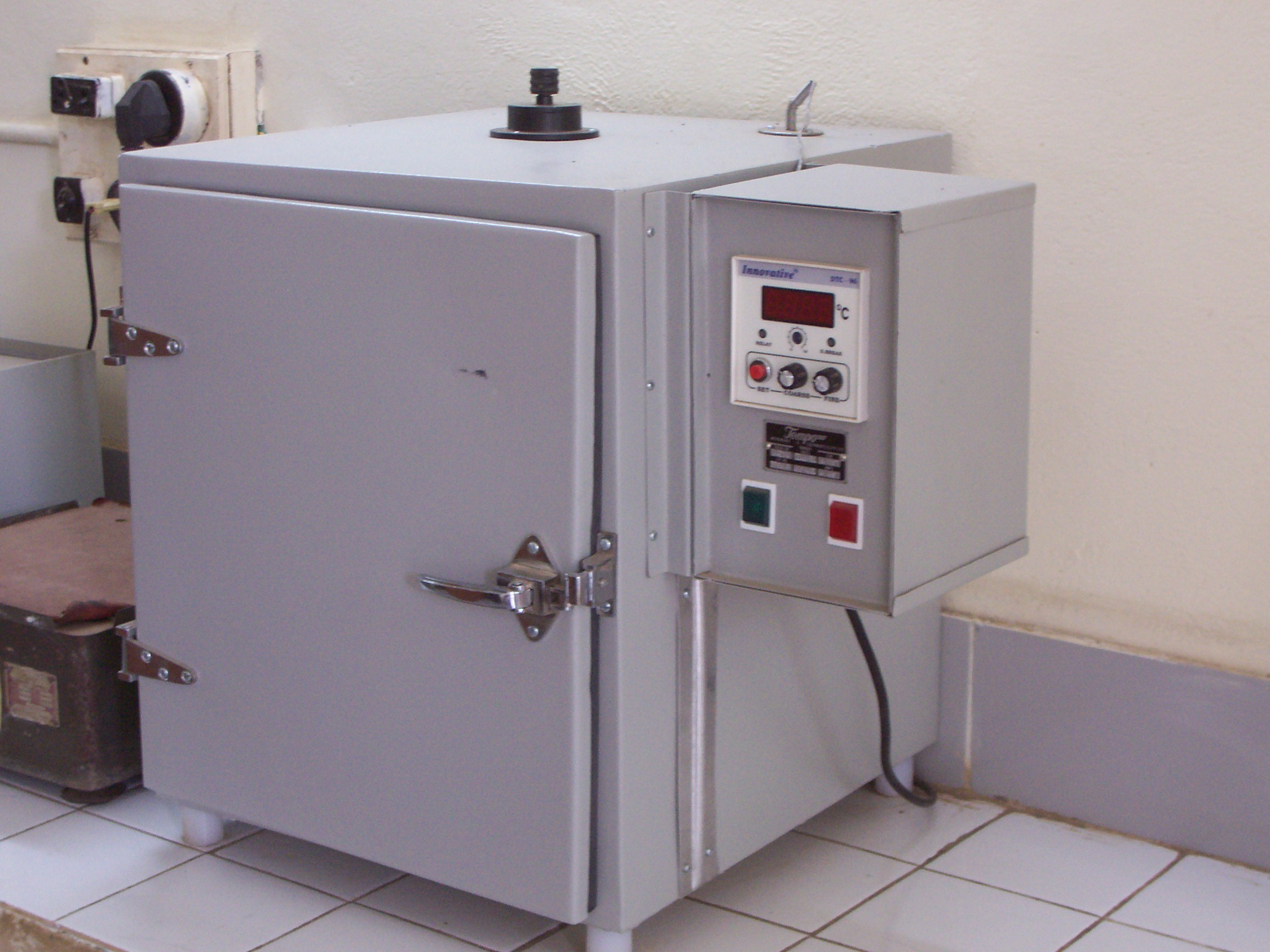
A Bacteriological incubator

== History of the laboratory incubator ==
From aiding in hatching chicken eggs to enabling scientists to understand and develop vaccines for deadly viruses, the laboratory incubator has seen numerous applications over the years it has been in use. The incubator has also provided a foundation for medical advances and experimental work in cellular and molecular biology.

While many technological advances have occurred since the primitive incubators first used in ancient Egypt and China, the main purpose of the incubator has remained unchanged: to create a stable, controlled environment conducive to research, study, and cultivation.

=== The earliest incubators ===
The earliest incubators were invented thousands of years ago in ancient Egypt and China, where they were used to keep chicken eggs warm. Use of incubators revolutionized food production, as it allowed chicks to hatch from eggs without requiring that a hen sit on them, thus freeing the hens to lay more eggs in a shorter period of time. Both early Egyptian and Chinese incubators were essentially large rooms that were heated by fires, where attendants turned the eggs at regular intervals to ensure even heat distribution.

=== In the 16th and 17th century ===
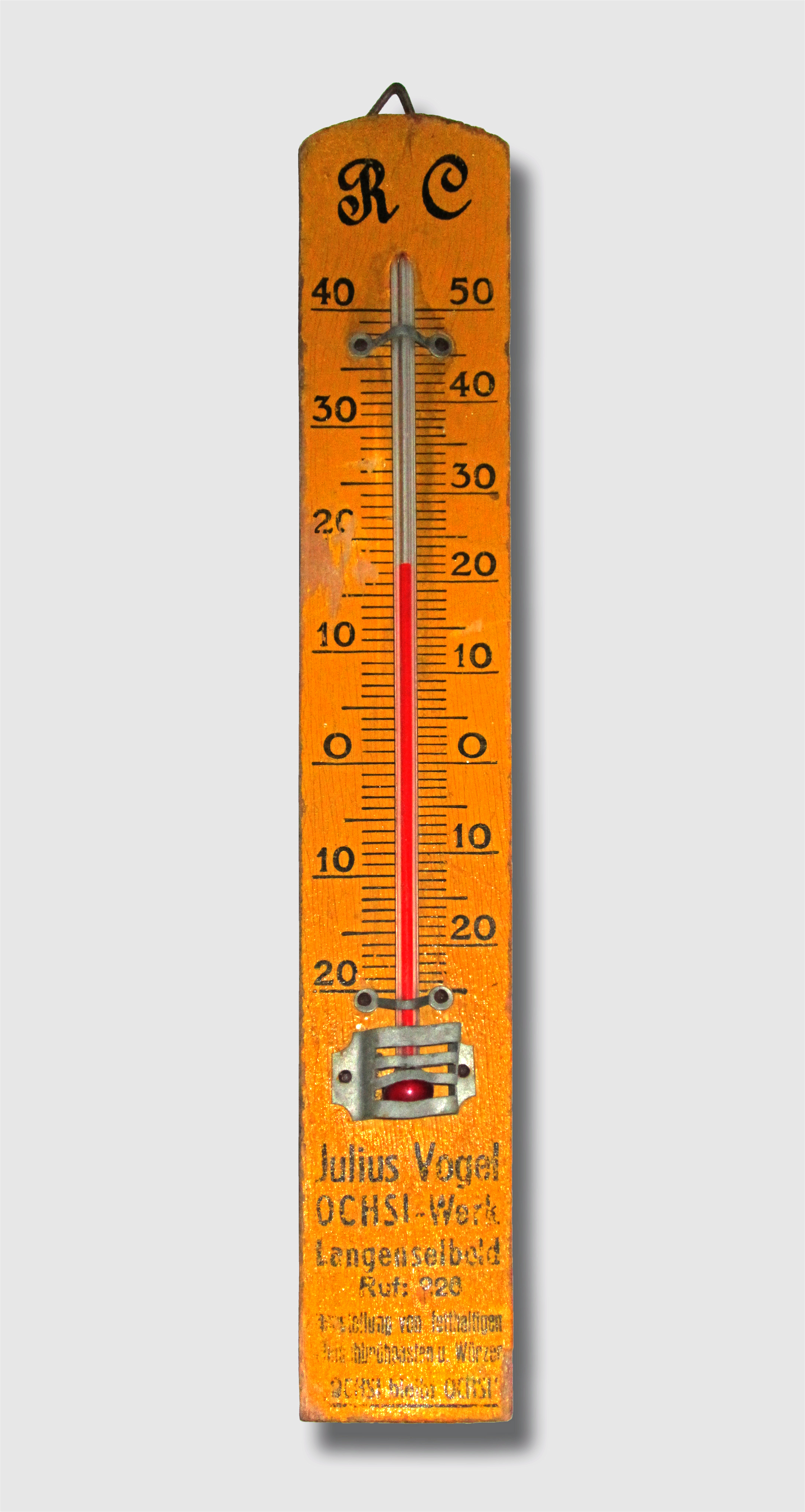
Reaumur thermometer

The incubator received an update in the 16th century when Jean Baptiste Porta drew on ancient Egyptian design to create a more modern egg incubator. While he eventually had to discontinue his work due to the Spanish Inquisition, Rene-Antoine Ferchault de Reaumur took up the challenge in the middle of the 17th century. Reaumur warmed his incubator with a wood stove and monitored its temperature using the Reaumur thermometer, another of his inventions.

=== In the 19th century ===
In the 19th century, researchers finally began to recognize that the use of incubators could contribute to medical advancements. They began to experiment to find the ideal environment for maintaining cell culture stocks. These early incubators were simply made up of bell jars that contained a single lit candle. Cultures were placed near the flame on the underside of the jar's lid, and the entire jar was placed in a dry, heated oven.

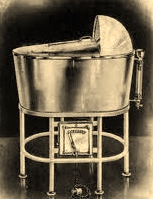
Incubator invented by Hess

In the late 19th century, doctors realized another practical use for incubators: keeping premature or weak infants alive. The first infant incubator, used at a women's hospital in Paris, was heated by kerosene lamps. Fifty years later, Julius H. Hess, an American physician often considered to be the father of neonatology, designed an electric infant incubator that closely resembles the infant incubators in use today.

=== In the 20th century ===
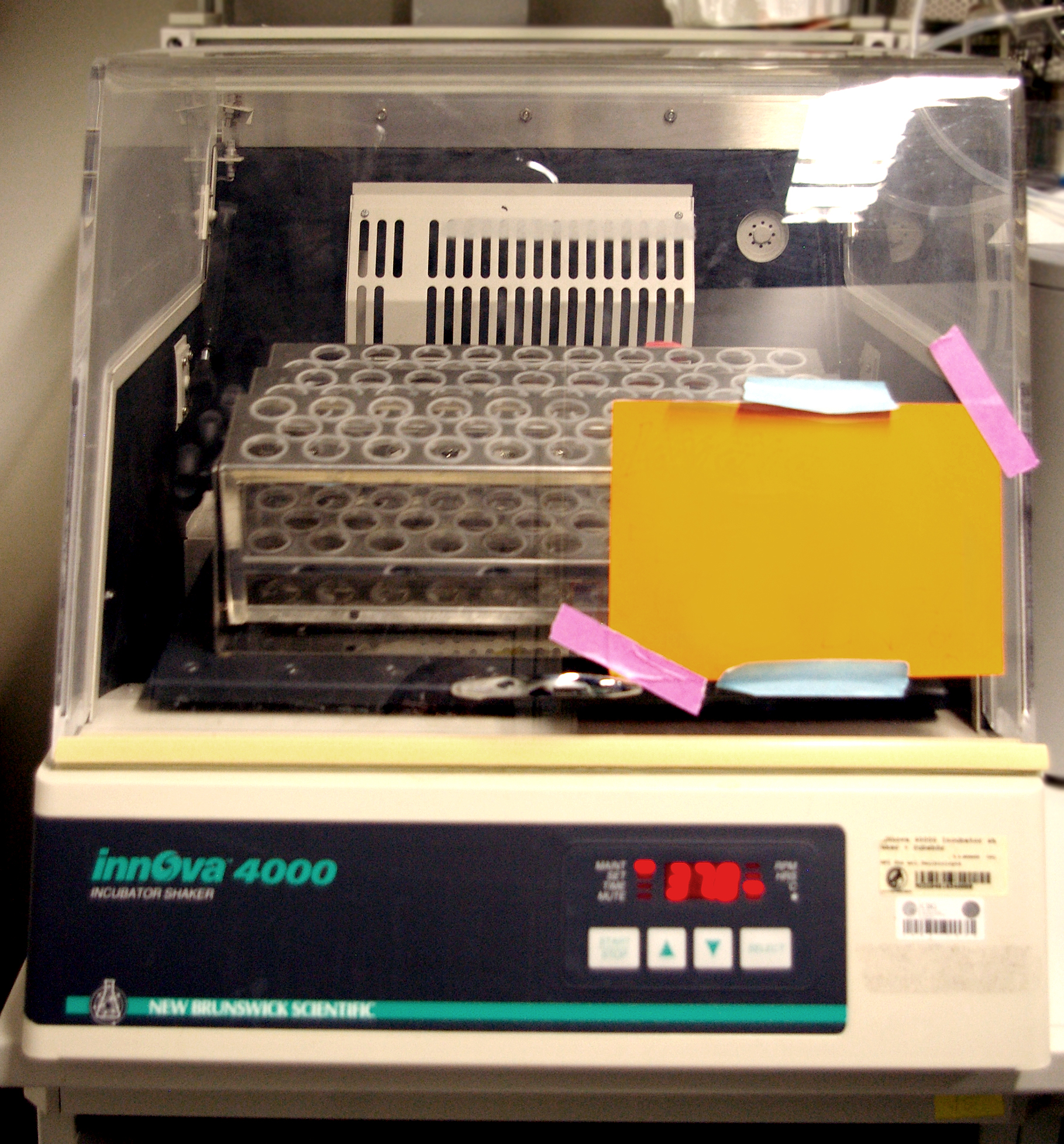
Shaking incubator

The next innovation in incubator technology came in the 1960s, when the CO_{2} incubator was introduced to the market. Demand came when doctors realized that they could use CO_{2} incubators to identify and study pathogens found in patients' bodily fluids. To do this, a sample was harvested and placed onto a sterile dish and into the incubator. The air in the incubator was kept at 37 degrees Celsius, the same temperature as the human body, and the incubator maintained the atmospheric carbon dioxide and nitrogen levels necessary to promote cell growth.

At this time, incubators also began to be used in genetic engineering. Scientists could create biologically essential proteins, such as insulin, with the use of incubators. Genetic modification could now take place on a molecular level, helping to improve the nutritional content and resistance to pestilence and disease of fruits and vegetables.

=== Today ===
Incubators serve a variety of functions in a scientific lab. Incubators generally maintain a constant temperature, however additional features are often built in. Many incubators also control humidity. Shaking incubators incorporate movement to mix cultures. Gas incubators regulate the internal gas composition. Some incubators have a means of circulating the air inside of them to ensure even distribution of temperatures. Many incubators built for laboratory use have a redundant power source, to ensure that power outages do not disrupt experiments. Incubators are made in a variety of sizes, from tabletop models, to warm rooms, which serve as incubators for large numbers of samples.

== See also ==
- Egyptian egg oven
