= Agar plate =

Petri dish with agar used to culture microbes

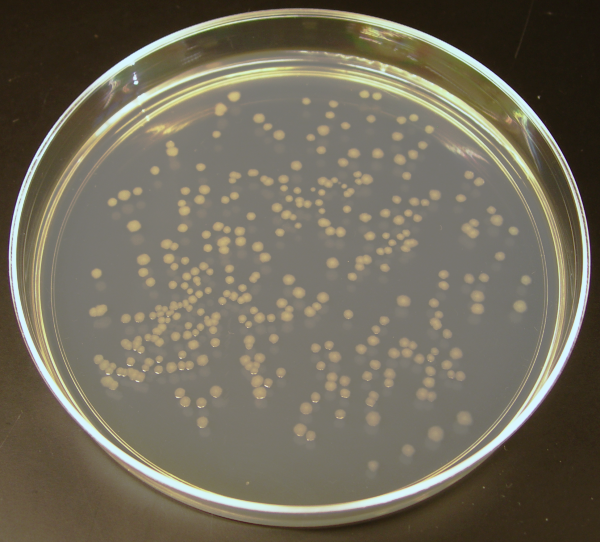
- An agar culture of E. coli colonies
- Uses: Microbiological culture Art
- Related items: Petri dish Growth medium

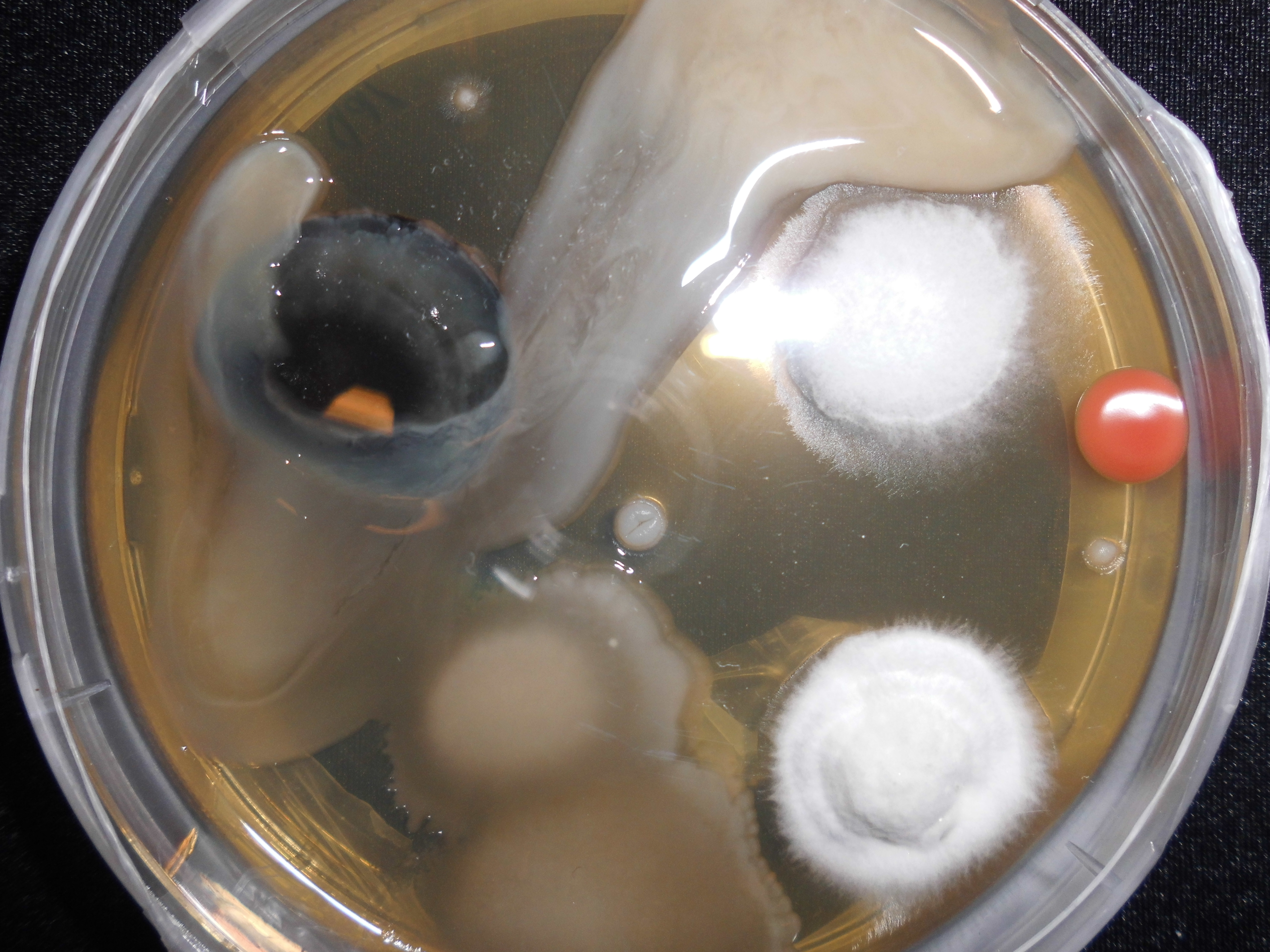
Contamination on an agar plate

An agar plate is a Petri dish that contains a growth medium solidified with agar, used to culture microorganisms. Sometimes selective compounds are added to influence growth, such as antibiotics.

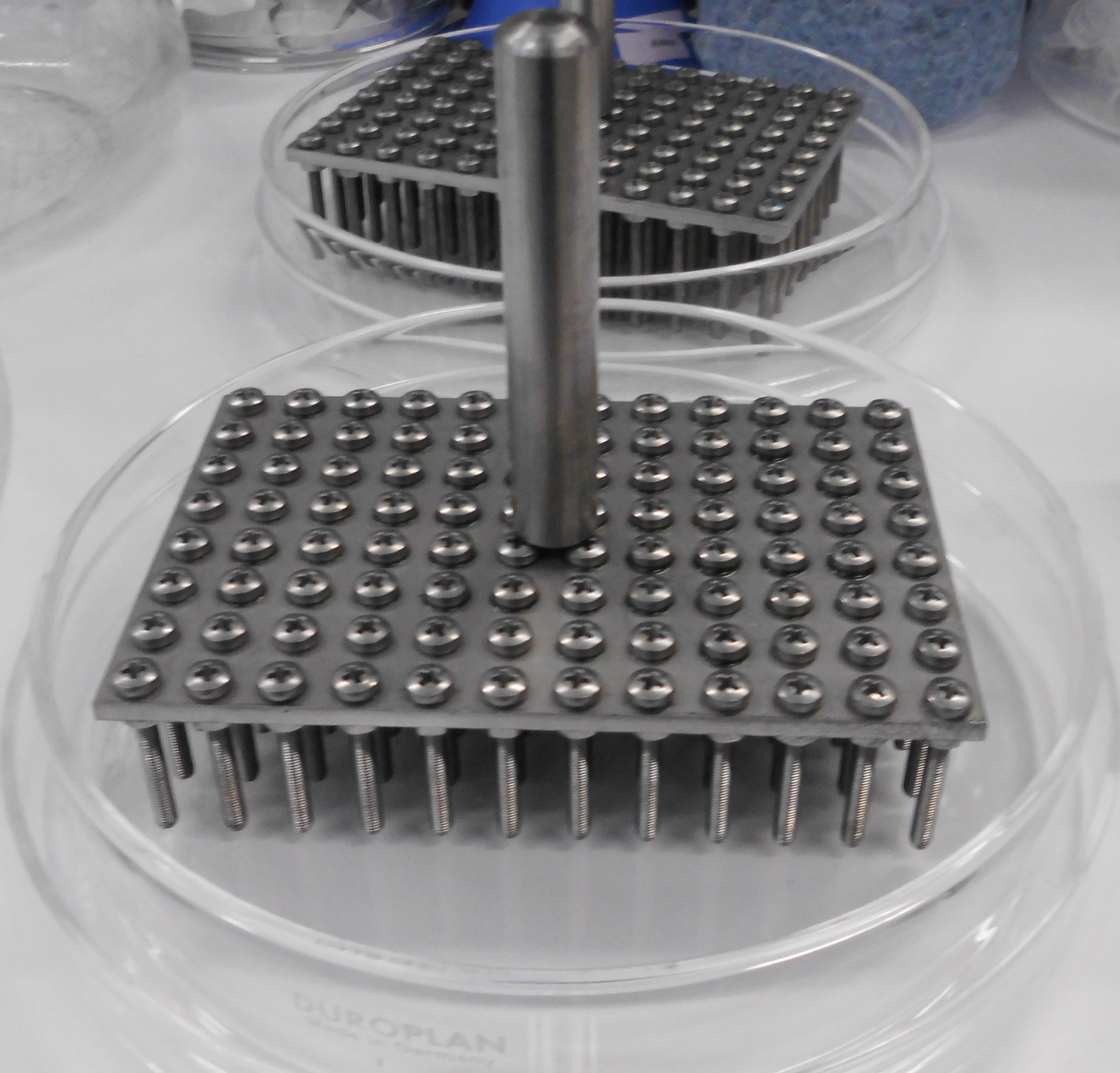
96 pinner used to perform spot assays with yeast, fungal or bacterial cells

Individual microorganisms placed on the plate will grow into individual colonies, each a clone genetically identical to the individual ancestor organism (except for the low, unavoidable rate of mutation). Thus, the plate can be used either to estimate the concentration of organisms in a liquid culture or a suitable dilution of that culture using a colony counter, or to generate genetically pure cultures from a mixed culture of genetically different organisms.

Several methods are available to plate out cells. One technique is known as "streaking". In this technique, a drop of the culture on the end of a thin, sterile loop of wire, sometimes known as an inoculator, is streaked across the surface of the agar leaving organisms behind, a higher number at the beginning of the streak and a lower number at the end. At some point during a successful "streak", the number of organisms deposited will be such that distinct individual colonies will grow in that area which may be removed for further culturing, using another sterile loop.

Another way of plating organisms, next to streaking, on agar plates is the spot analysis. This type of analysis is often used to check the viability of cells and is performed with pinners (often also called froggers). A third technique is using sterile glass beads to plate out cells. In this technique, cells are grown in a liquid culture, in which a small volume is pipetted on the agar plate and then spread out with the beads. Replica plating is another technique used to plate out cells on agar plates. These four techniques are the most common, but others are also possible. It is crucial to work in a sterile manner to prevent contamination on the agar plates. Plating is thus often done in a laminar flow cabinet or on the working bench next to a bunsen burner.

== History ==
In 1881, Fanny Hesse, who was working as a technician for her husband Walther Hesse in the laboratory of Robert Koch, suggested agar as an effective setting agent, since it had been commonplace in jam making for some time.

== Types ==
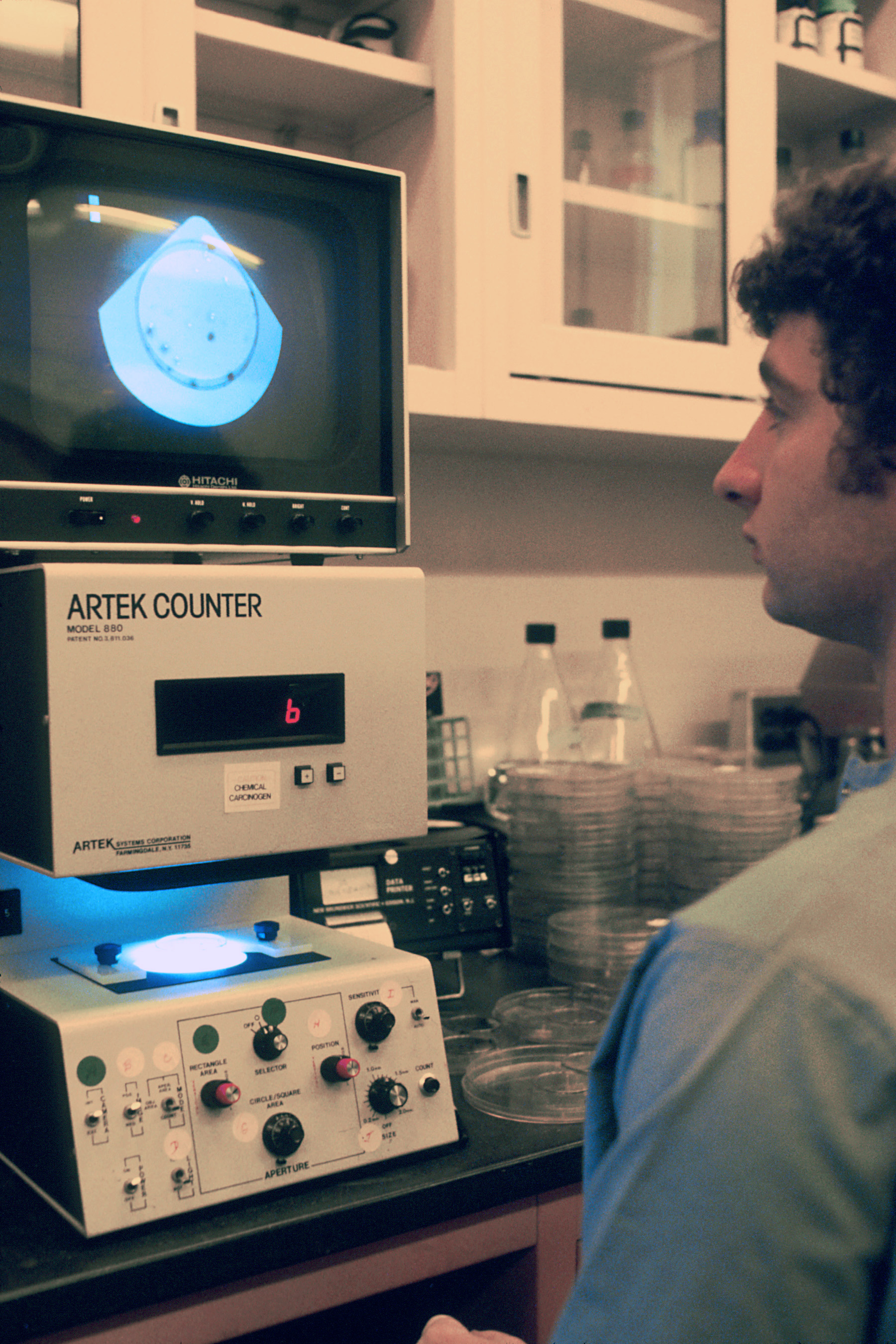
An agar plate being viewed in an electronic colony counter

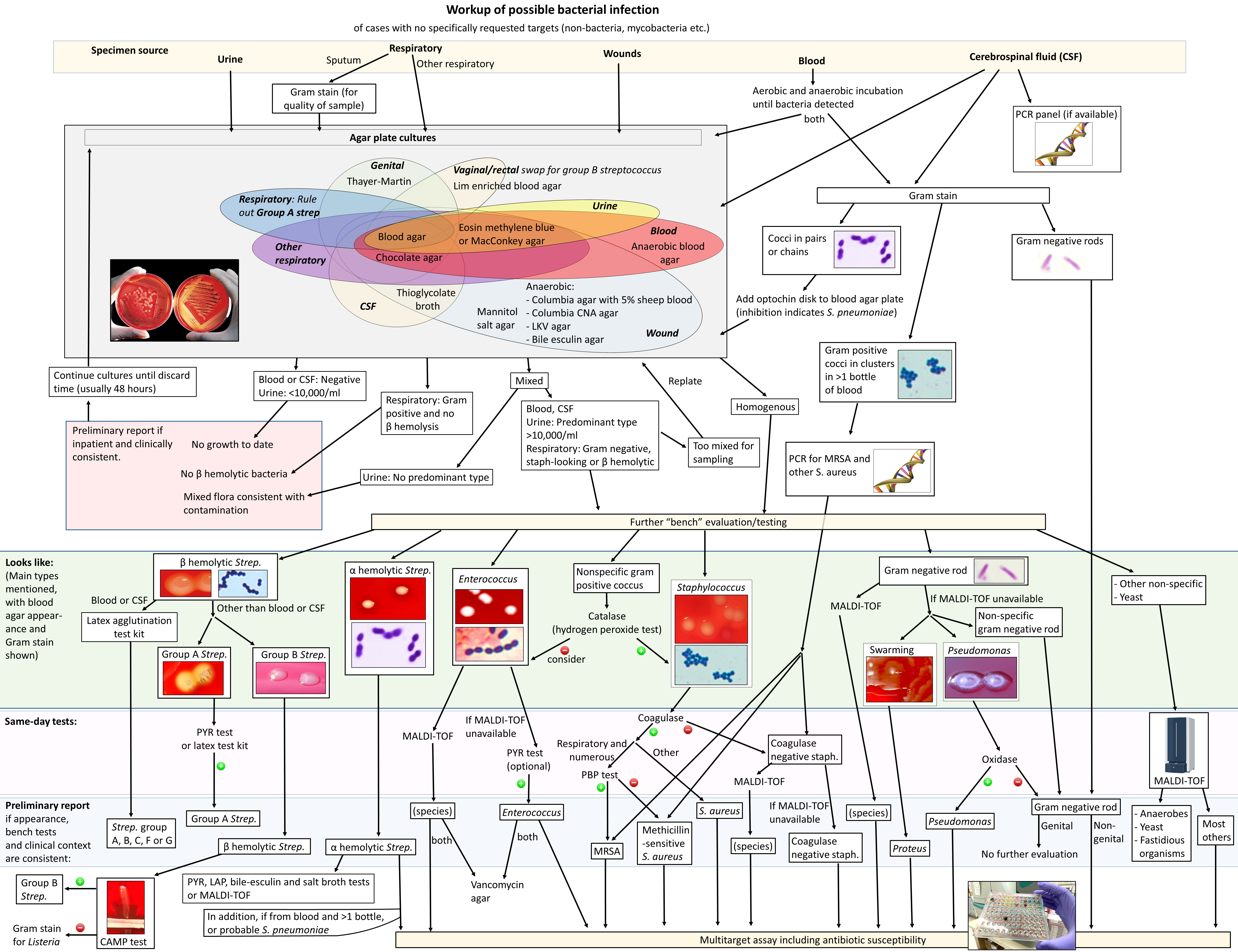
Example of a workup algorithm of possible bacterial infection in cases with no specifically requested targets (non-bacteria, mycobacteria etc.), with most common situations and agents seen in a New England community hospital setting. Different agar plates are used for different specimen sources, as seen in the upper left quadrant.

Like other growth media, the formulations of agar used in plates may be classified as either "defined" or "undefined"; a defined medium is synthesized from individual chemicals required by the organism so the exact molecular composition is known, whereas an undefined medium is made from natural products such as yeast extract, where the precise composition is unknown.

Agar plates may be formulated as either permissive, with the intent of allowing the growth of whatever organisms are present, or restrictive or selective, with the intent of only allowing the growth of a particular subset of those organisms. This may take the form of a nutritional requirement, for instance providing a particular compound such as lactose as the only source of carbon and thereby selecting only organisms which can metabolize that compound, or by including a particular antibiotic or other substance to select only organisms which are resistant to that substance. This correlates to some degree with defined and undefined media; undefined media, made from natural products and containing an unknown combination of very many organic molecules, is typically more permissive in terms of supplying the needs of a wider variety of organisms. In contrast, defined media can be precisely tailored to select organisms with specific properties.

Agar plates may also be indicator plates, in which the organisms are not selected based on growth, but are instead distinguished by a color change in some colonies, typically caused by the action of an enzyme on some compound added to the medium.

The plates are incubated for 12 hours up to several days, depending on the test that is performed.

Commonly used types of agar plates include:

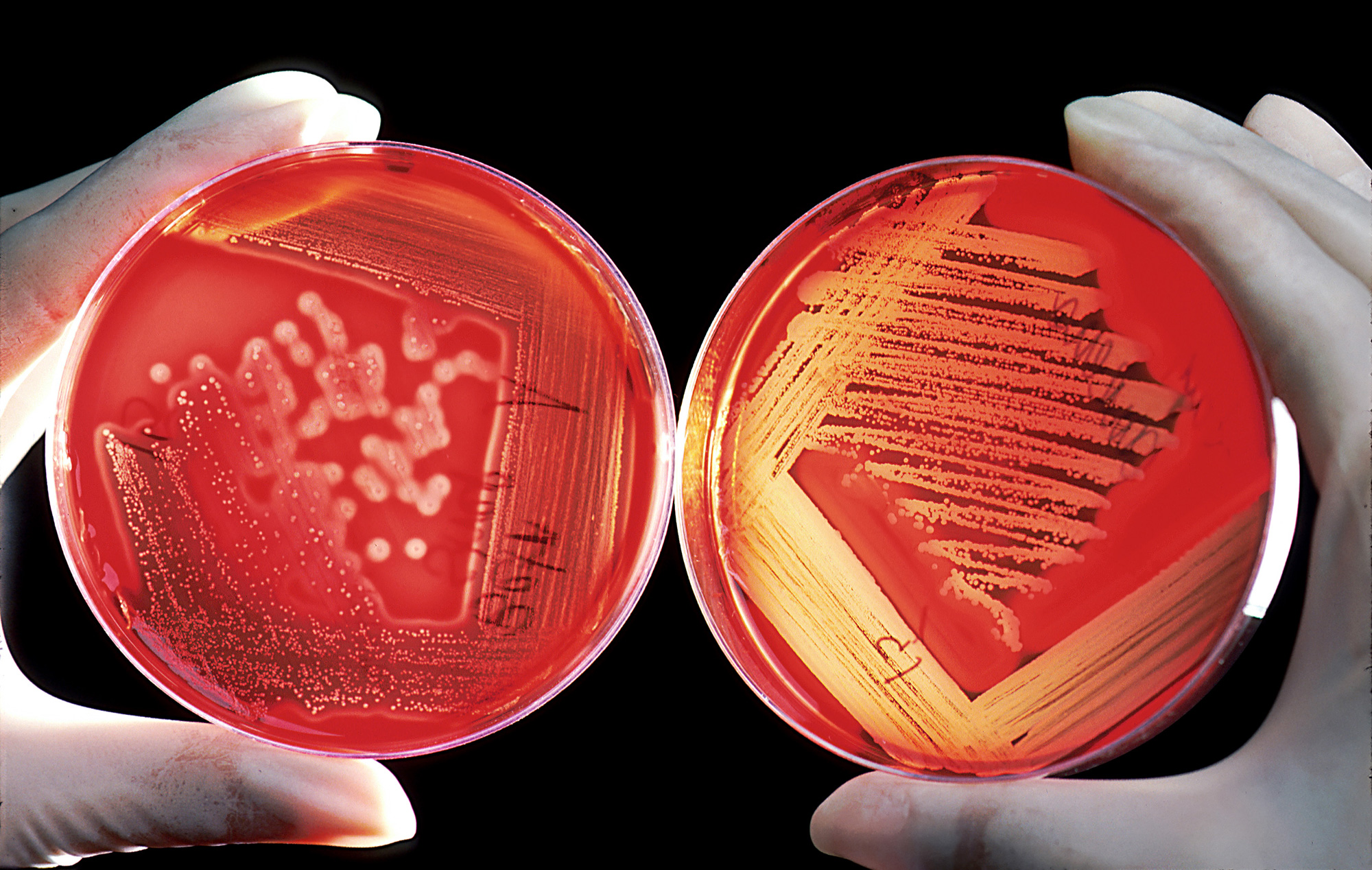
Red blood cells on an agar plate are used to diagnose infection. On the left is a positive Staphylococcus infection, on the right a positive Streptococcus culture.

=== Blood agar ===
Hemolyses of Streptococcus spp. (left) α-hemolysis (S. mitis); (middle) β-hemolysis (S. pyogenes); (right) γ-hemolysis (= non-hemolytic, S. salivarius)

==== Blood agar plate ====
Blood agar plates (BAPs) contain mammalian blood (usually sheep or horse), typically at a 5–10% concentration. BAPs are enriched, and differential media is used to isolate fastidious organisms and detect hemolytic activity. β-Hemolytic activity will show lysis and complete digestion of red blood cell contents surrounding a colony. Examples include Streptococcus haemolyticus. α-Hemolysis will only cause partial lysis of the red blood cells (the cell membrane is left intact) and appear green or brown due to the conversion of hemoglobin to methemoglobin. An example of this would be Streptococcus viridans. γ-Hemolysis (or non-hemolytic) is the term referring to a lack of hemolytic activity. BAPs also contain meat extract or yeast extract, tryptone, sodium chloride, and agar.

==== Chocolate agar ====
Chocolate agar is a type of blood agar plate in which the blood cells have been lysed by heating the cells to 80 °C. It is used for growing fastidious respiratory bacteria, such as Haemophilus influenzae. Chocolate agar is named for its color, and no chocolate is contained in the plate.

==== Thayer–Martin agar ====
Thayer–Martin agar is a chocolate agar designed to isolate Neisseria gonorrhoeae and Neisseria meningitidis.

==== Thiosulfate–citrate–bile salts–sucrose agar ====
Thiosulfate–citrate–bile salts–sucrose agar enhances growth of Vibrio spp., including Vibrio cholerae.

=== General bacterial media ===
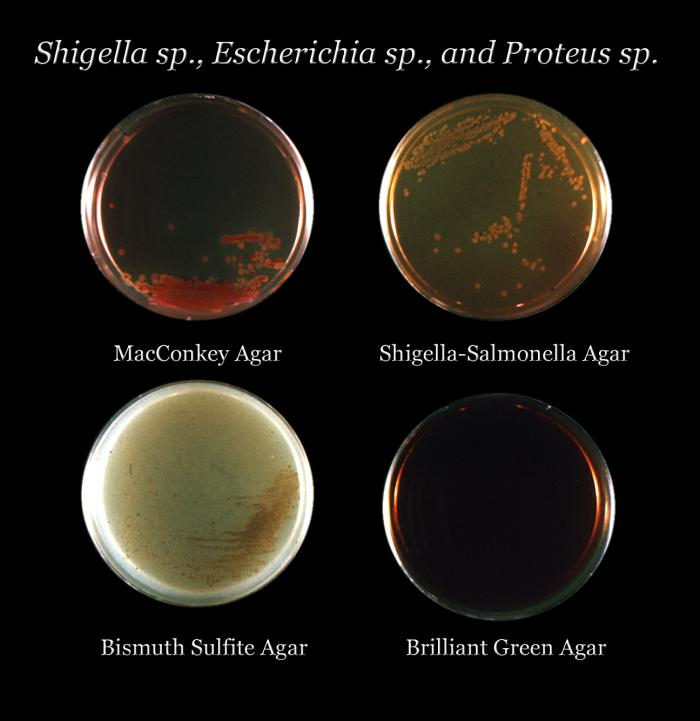
Four types of agar plate demonstrating differential growth depending on bacterial metabolism

- Bile esculin agar is used for the isolation of Enterococcus and group D Streptococcus species.
- CLED agar – cysteine, lactose, electrolyte-deficient agar is used to isolate and differentiate urinary tract bacteria, since it inhibits Proteus species swarming and can distinguish between lactose fermenters and nonfermenters.
- Granada medium is used to isolate and differentiate group B Streptococcus, Streptococcus agalactiae from clinical samples. It grows in Granada medium as red colonies, and most of the accompanying bacteria are inhibited.
- Hektoen enteric agar is designed to isolate and recover fecal bacteria of the family Enterobacteriaceae. It is particularly useful in isolating Salmonella and Shigella.
- Lysogeny broth is used to culture Escherichia coli.
- MacConkey agar is a selective and differential medium used to differentiate between gram-negative bacteria while inhibiting the growth of gram-positive bacteria. Adding bile salts and crystal violet to the agar inhibits the growth of most gram-positive bacteria, making MacConkey agar selective. Lactose and neutral red are added to differentiate the lactose fermenters, which form pink colonies, from lactose nonfermenters that form clear colonies. An alternative medium, eosin methylene blue serves a similar purpose.
- Mannitol salt agar is also a selective and differential medium. The mannitol indicates organisms that ferment mannitol: mannitol fermentation produces lactic acid, lowering the pH and turning the plate yellow. The salt is to select for halophiles; organisms that cannot withstand a high salt content are unable to grow well.
- Mueller–Hinton agar contains beef infusion, peptone, and starch, and is used primarily for antibiotic susceptibility testing. It can be in a form of blood agar.
- Nutrient agar is usually used for growth of nonfastidious organisms and observation of pigment production. It is safe to use in school science laboratories because it does not selectively grow pathogenic bacteria.
- Önöz agar allows more rapid bacteriological diagnosis, as Salmonella and Shigella colonies can be clearly and reliably differentiated from other Enterobacteriaceae. The yields of Salmonella from stool samples obtained, when using this medium, are higher than those obtained with LEIFSON agar or Salmonella–Shigella agar.
- Phenylethyl alcohol agar selects for Staphylococcus species while inhibiting Gram-negative bacilli (e.g., Escherichia coli, Shigella, Proteus, etc.).
- R2A agar, a nonspecific medium, imitates water, so is used for water analysis.
- Tryptic (trypticase) soy agar (TSA) is a general-purpose medium produced by enzymatic digestion of soybean meal and casein. It is frequently the base medium of other agar types; for example, blood agar plates are made by enriching TSA plates with blood. TSA plates support growth of many semifastidious bacteria, including some species of Brucella, Corynebacterium, Listeria, Neisseria, and Vibrio.
- Xylose-lysine-deoxycholate agar is used for the culture of stool samples and contains two indicators. It is formulated to inhibit Gram-positive bacteria, while the growth of Gram-negative bacilli is encouraged. The colonies of lactose fermenters appear yellow. It is also used to culture possible Salmonella that may be present in a food sample. Most Salmonella colonies produce a black centre on it.
- Cetrimide agar is used for the selective isolation of the Gram-negative bacterium Pseudomonas aeruginosa.
- Tinsdale agar contains potassium tellurite, which can isolate Corynebacterium diphteriae.

=== Fungal media ===
- Sabouraud agar is used to culture fungi and has a low pH that inhibits the growth of most bacteria; it also contains the antibiotic gentamicin to specifically inhibit the growth of Gram-negative bacteria.
- Hay infusion agar is specific for the culturing of slime moulds (which are not fungi).
- Potato dextrose agar is used to culture certain types of fungi.
- Malt extract agar has a high content of peptone and is acidic. It is essentially used in the isolation of fungal microorganisms.
- MMN (Modified Melin-Norkrans) medium and BAF medium are used for ectomycorrhizal fungi.
- Chromogenic agars can distinguish some major types of fungal infection.
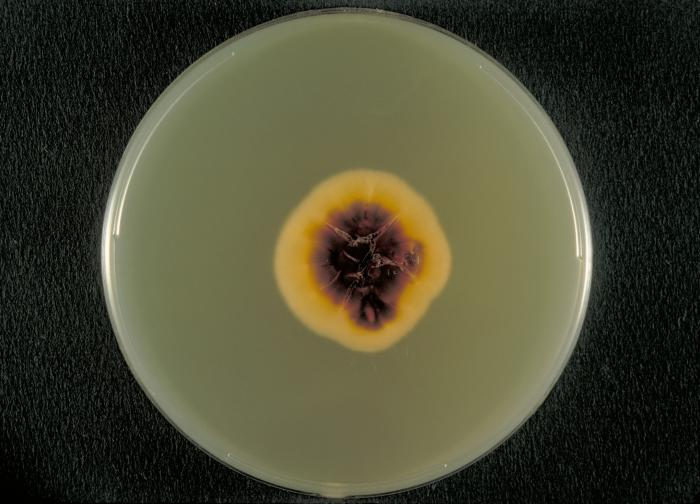
Bottom view of a Sabouraud agar plate with a colony of Trichophyton rubrum var. rodhaini

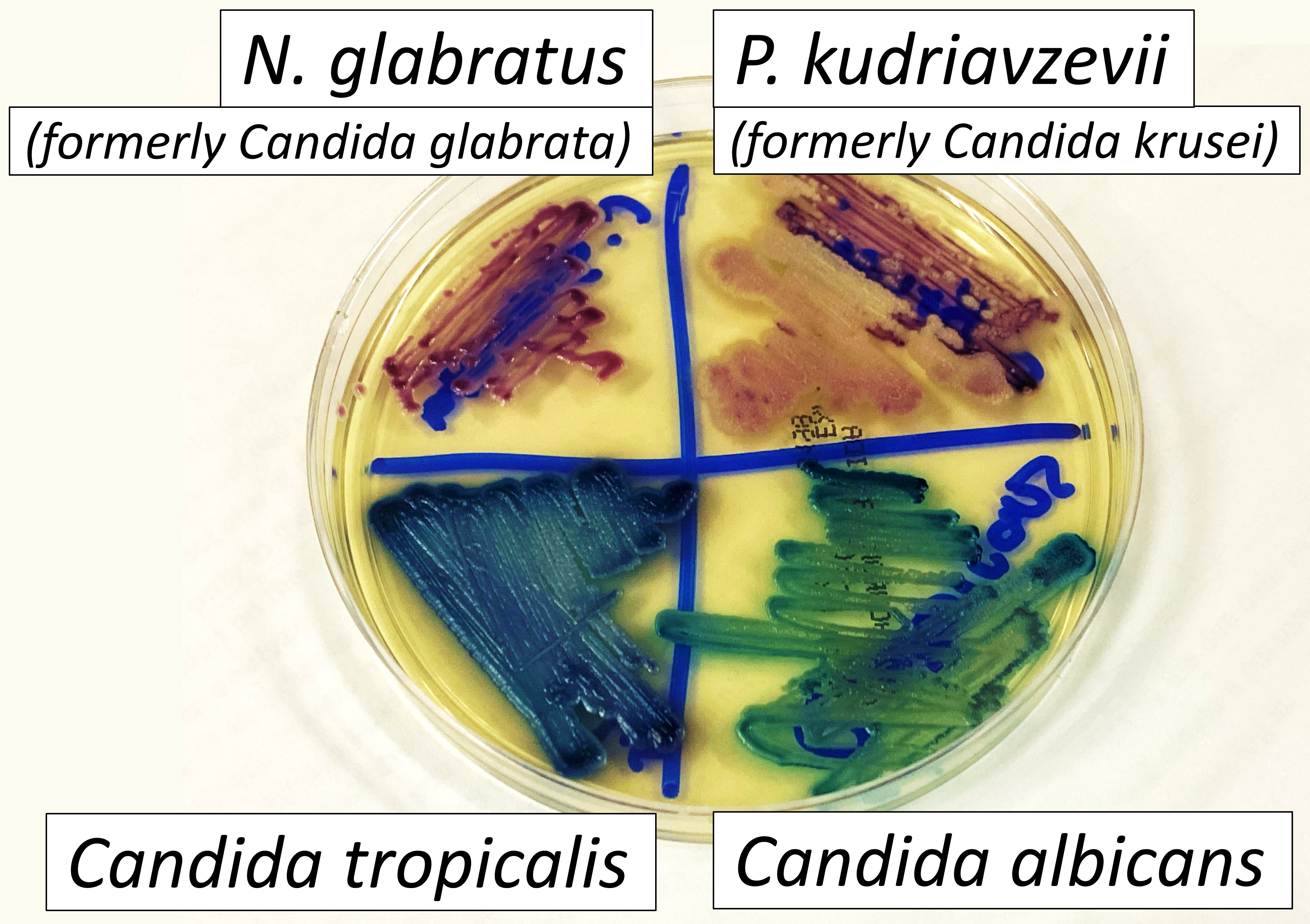
CHROMAgar (a chromogenic agar) with its distinctive presentation of some major fungal pathogens.

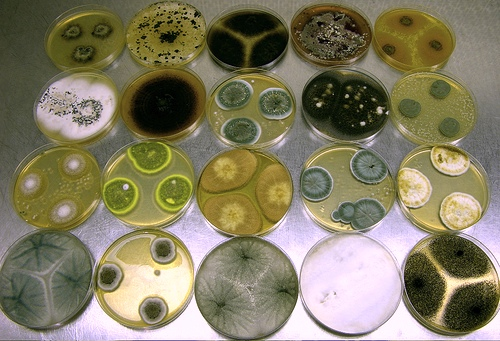
Fungi (ascomycetes) growing in axenic cultures, each of which is a culture of one selected organism and is free of all other organisms, enabling study of the cultured organism in isolation

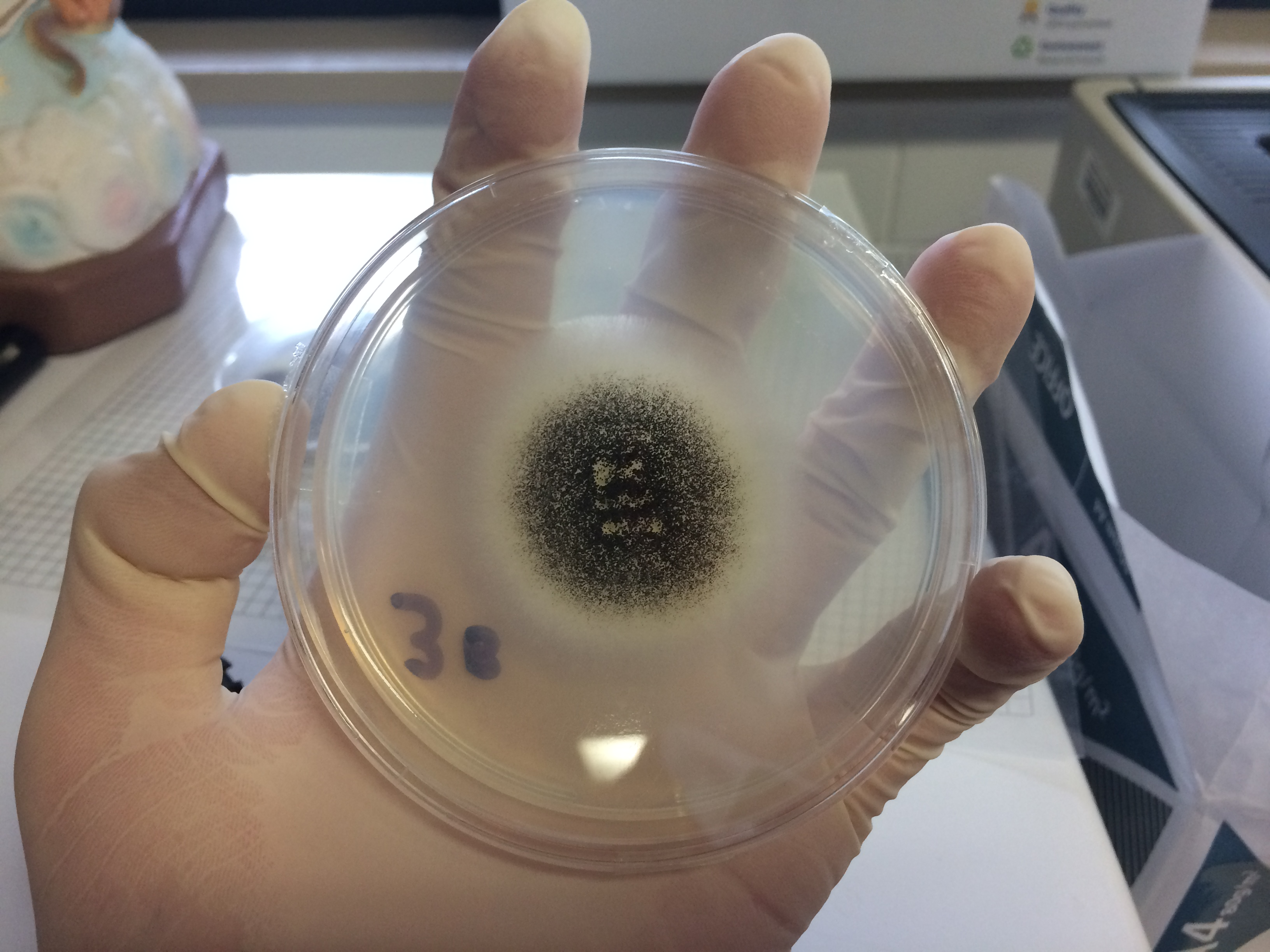
Aspergillus niger growing on potato dextrose agar

=== Moss media ===
- Knop agar is used to axenically culture protonema and whole moss plants, such as those of Physcomitrella patens, a model organism.

=== Yeast media ===
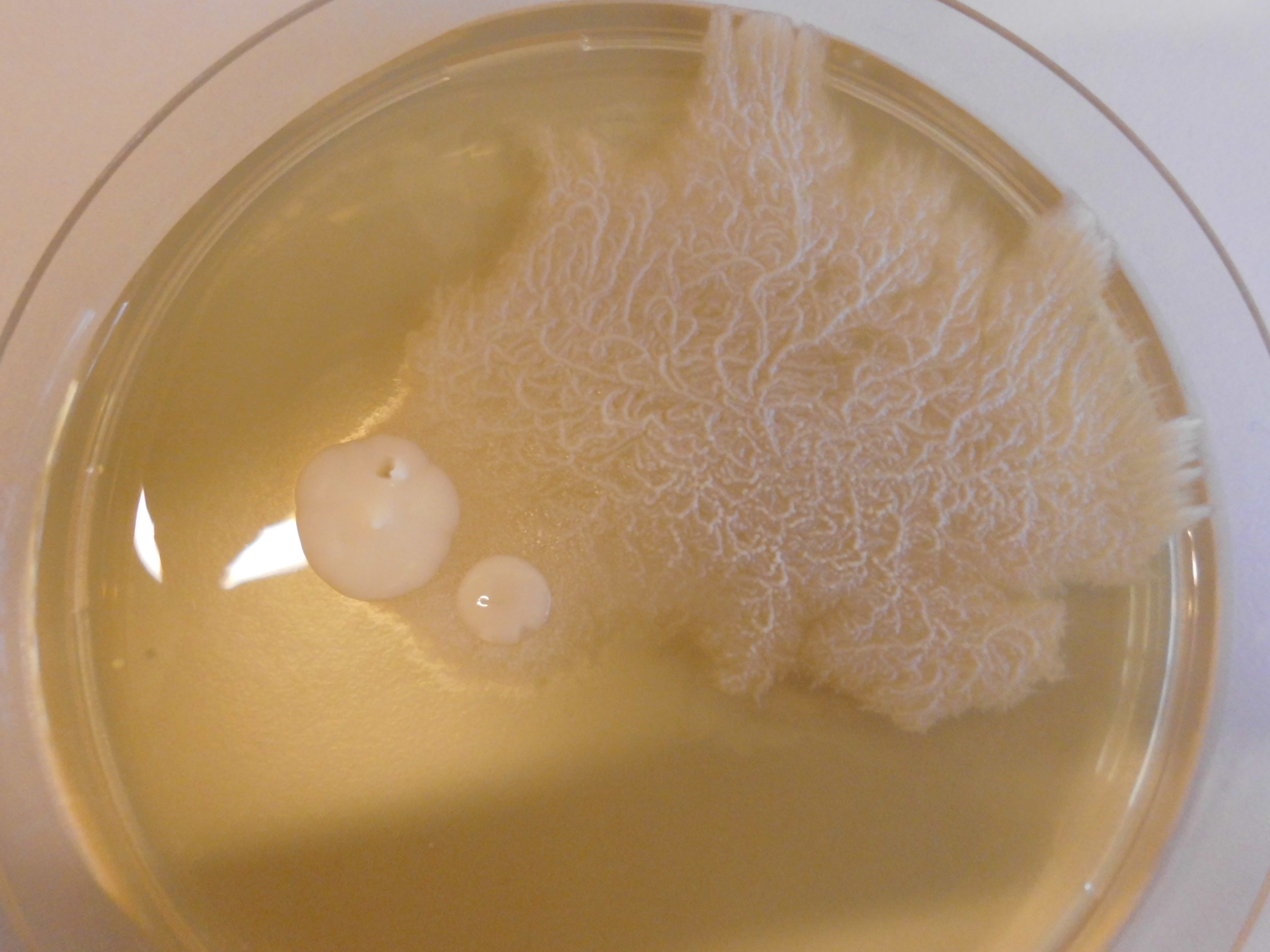
the yeast Candida albicans growing both as yeast cells and filamentous cells on YPD agar

- YEPD media is often used as a general growth media for yeasts like Saccharomyces cerevisiae and Candida albicans
- Sporulation medium is medium used when spores have to be formed. It can also be used when working with fungi or bacteria depending on whether or not the strain is capable of forming spores.

=== Mega Plate ===
- A 2' x 4' petri plate filled with 14L (liters) of seaweed derived agar medium created by Harvard scientists that was used to see how E. coli evolved to be resistant to antibiotics. The mega plate also helped study more unique concepts of microbiology such as parallel evolution, mutation selection, colonial interference etc.

== See also ==
- Microbial art
- Viral plaque

Different specific types of agar:

- Casein nutrient agar
- MRS agar
- New York City Agar
