= 4T1 =

Breast cancer cell line

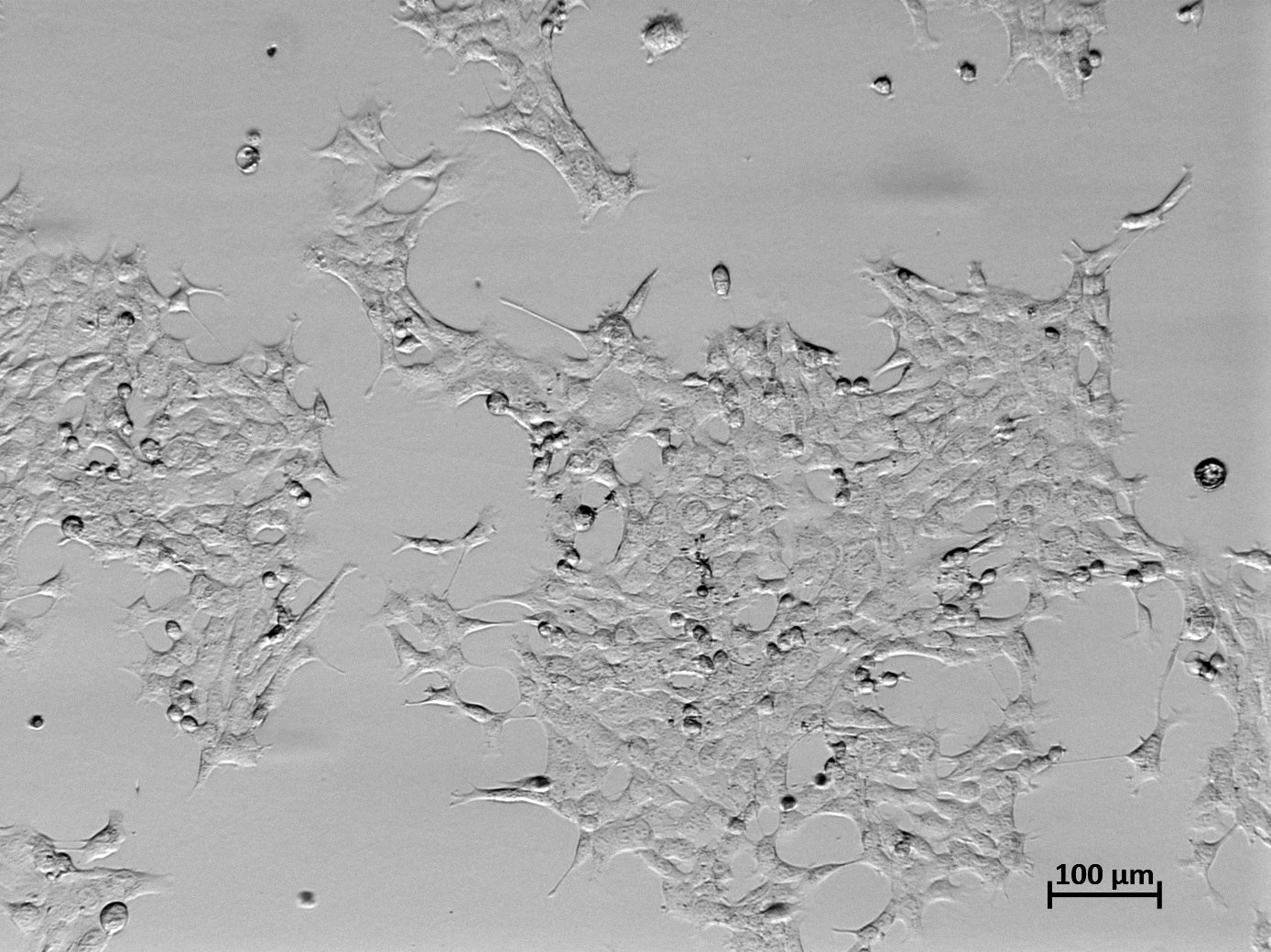
4T1 cell culture - 50% confluence

4T1 is a breast cancer cell line derived from the mammary gland tissue of a mouse BALB/c strain. 4T1 cells are epithelial and are resistant to 6-thioguanine. In preclinical research, 4T1 cells have been used to study breast cancer metastasis as they can metastasize to the lung, liver, lymph nodes, brain and bone. The cells are known to be highly aggressive in live tissues.

== History ==
4T1 cell line was originally isolated by Fred Miller and colleagues as one of four sublines derived from the 410.4 tumor that was isolated from a single spontaneously arising mammary tumor.

== Characteristics ==
4T1 resembles human metastatic triple-negative breast cancer (TNBC) in lack of the expression of estrogen receptor (ER), progesterone receptor (PR), and epidermal growth factor receptor 2 (HER2). In addition, it was described, that this cell line is poorly immunogenic in mice, which corresponds to the characteristics of human mammary adenocarcinoma and leads to the higher tumorigenicity and invasiveness of this breast cancer model.

== Application ==
To understand the pathogenesis of cancer patients, it is necessary to have model systems that faithfully mimic this condition. The application of a murine cancer cell line, such as 4T1, in a mouse model is of great value for preclinical TNBC studies. The 4T1 cell line is widely used as a syngeneic model for human triple-negative breast cancer, which is responsible for more than 17% of breast cancers diagnosed worldwide each year. 4T1 cells can be transplanted into the fat pad of the murine mammary gland, where they are highly tumorigenic, invasive, and spontaneously metastasize to distant organs such as the lungs, liver, lymph nodes, brain, and bone.

== Cultivation ==
4T1 cells grow in 37 °C with 95% air and 5% of carbon dioxide (CO_{2}). Their average doubling time is 14 hours. The base medium for this cell line is RPMI-1640 Medium with a fetal bovine serum in a final concentration of 10%. 4T1 cells should not be allowed to become 100% confluent. Subculturing at 80% confluence is recommended. For detaching the cells from the surface, rinsing with 0.25% trypsin-0.53mM EDTA solution at room temperature is used. Complete growth medium 95% with DMSO 5% is used as a freezing medium and cells are stored at liquid nitrogen vapor phase temperature.

== Variants ==
Available variants
CVCL_0125 (4T1)
CVCL_QZ56 (4T1-eGFP-Puro)
CVCL_QZ59 (4T1-Fluc-Neo/iRFP-Puro)
CVCL_L899 (4T1-luc2)
CVCL_QZ61 (4T1-mNIS (monoclonal))
CVCL_QZ64 (4T1-mNIS-Puro)
CVCL_5I85 (4T1-Red-FLuc-GFP)
CVCL_GR31 (4T1.13)
CVCL_XG69 (4T1/GFP/FlucII)
CVCL_QZ57 (4T1-Fluc-Neo)
CVCL_QZ60 (4T1-iRFP-Puro)
CVCL_5J28 (4T1-luc2-GFP)
CVCL_QZ62 (4T1-mNIS-Neo/eGFP-Puro)
CVCL_QZ65 (4T1-mNIS-Puro/Fluc-Neo)
CVCL_HE47 (4T1-S)
CVCL_GR32 (4T1.2)
CVCL_QZ58 (4T1-Fluc-Neo/eGFP-Puro)
CVCL_J239 (4T1-Luc)
CVCL_5J46 (4T1-luc2-tdTomato)
CVCL_QZ63 (4T1-mNIS-Neo/iRFP-Puro)
CVCL_5I84 (4T1-Red-FLuc)
CVCL_5J45 (4T1-tdTomato)
CVCL_JG34 (4T1/CMV-Luc #6)
