= ZR-75-1 =

Human breast cancer line

ZR-75-1 is a human breast cancer cell line that is often used in scientific research. It is noted for its receptiveness to estrogen, making it a valuable cell line for research involving estrogen-dependent cancers. It has dozens of derivatives, many of which have been valuable subjects of research in studies.

== History ==
ZR-75-1 was derived from a malignant ascitic effusion by researchers from the National Cancer Institute which operated under the National Institutes of Health. The line was collected in the 1970s from a 63-year-old Caucasian woman who had undergone a radical mastectomy and had developed an infiltrating ductal carcinoma. The intent of the original researchers was to develop a cell line unadulterated by oncoviruses, as many earlier breast cancer cell lines were often contaminated with these retroviruses which introduced unwanted elements into research. The effort largely succeeded, as ZR-75-1 became one of the first breast cancer lines that enabled the controlled study of cancer cell biology free from the contamination of oncoviruses. Since its derivativement, dozens of descendant cell lines have been created. ZR-75-1 and its descendants have historically been used by researchers for their stability and predictable response to estrogen.

== Characteristics ==
ZR-75-1 is classified as a Luminal A type cancer. This reflects its expression of hormone receptors. It exhibits a low concentration of Ki-67 protein, which is associated with lower proliferative activity compared to other more aggressive types of cancer. ZR-75-1 possesses a wild type TP53 gene, a somewhat unusual trait among cancer cells. However, it does contain a mutated PTEN gene, which contributes to tumor development.

The cells of ZR-75-1 display a grape-like morphology. This morphology results from their tendency to form clusters that adhere loosely to growth surfaces. ZR-75-1 is estrogen-dependent, expressing the estrogen receptor (ER) gene and responding to hormones to induce growth. It does not express epidermal growth factor receptor (EGFR) in standard conditions. Unlike other estrogen-dependent cancers, ZR-75-1 shows an almost total absence of growth when first deprived of estrogen. Over time, however, the cell line is capable of developing a type of growth independent of steroids, through adaptive cellular changes. This property makes it especially ideal for modeling the transition from estrogenic to antiestrogenic cancer growth, as the transition is simple and easy to quantify.

Cytogenetically, ZR-75-1 often displays anywhere between 69 and 75 chromosomes, indicating a hyperdiploid karyotype. This variation reflects the genetic instability that is a hallmark of cancers. In spite of this instability, ZR-75-1 is still relatively stable in the context of cell lines.

== Research Application ==
ZR-75-1 cells are often used in biomedical, biochemical cancer and pharmaceutical research by scientists. It has been key in research investigating (ER+) breast cancer and the acquisition of resistance to hormone therapy due to its nature of predictable and simple hormonal responsiveness.

One of the most significant contributions of ZR-75-1 research involves the study of resistance to Tamoxifen, a selective estrogen receptor modulator (SERM). Tamoxifen functions by inhibiting estrogen signaling, thereby slowing or halting the growth of ER+ tumors. Experiments using ZR-75-1 showed that when Tamoxifen was administered and estrogen signaling was blocked, the cells initially entered a state devoid of growth. After a period of inactivity, however, they resumed growth, demonstrating that the cells could adapt to the absence of estrogen stimulation. This ability to rebound against antiestrogen treatment provided key insights into how ER+ breast cancers evolve their mechanisms of resistance to hormone therapy.

Researchers have used ZR-75-1 to determine that tumors achieve antiestrogenic resistance through epigenetic and phylogenetic changes that upregulate alternative growth signaling pathways; in particular, the upregulation of autocrine signaling involving growth factors such as EGFR that allow cancerous cells to grow independently of external hormonal signaling.

ZR-75-1 has been used in genomic research to map genes linked to hormone resistance and tumor progression. In one series of experiments, researchers integrated oncoviruses into colonies of ZR-75-1 cells and subjected them to Tamoxifen treatment. Surviving colonies were then analyzed for common genetic changes. Through this screening process, scientists identified the BCAR1 gene as a major contributor to antiestrogen resistance, with additional genes also suspected. This discovery helped establish the biomolecular and biochemical basis of resistance which provided information key to future research in treating cancer.

Many derivatives of ZR-75-1 have been modified in order to investigate specific genes. These derivatives, created by knocking out or overexpressing selected genes, have been key in understanding the role of individual proteins in cancer development, hormone signaling, and drug responses. Due to the stability of ZR-75-1 and its children, it is able to quantify the effects of genes in a way that would otherwise be difficult or tedious.

== Cultivation ==
The recommended culture medium for ZR-75-1 cell lines is RPMI-1640 supplemented with 10% fetal bovine serum (FBS), which provides the necessary growth factors and nutrients to grow. The cells are best maintained at a temperature of around 37 °C, similar to the body temperature of a healthy human body. A 5% CO₂ atmosphere is recommended to maintain proper pH balance.

For long term preservation, ZR-75-1 cells is typically stored in liquid nitrogen. To ensure long term survival, long term storage temperatures should not fall below −70 °C. When unfrozen, the cells should be handled with care to prevent the unnecessary loss of cell life.

It is recommended that ZR-75-1 cultures be split when they reach approximately 80–90% confluence in order to prevent nutrient depletion and overgrowth. For the reseeding of cultures, an initial density of around 2 × 10⁴ cells per cm² is ideal to best promote growth.
