= Platelet lysate =

Substitute supplement for fetal bovine serum (FBS)

Human platelet lysate (or hPL) is a substitute supplement for fetal bovine serum (FBS) in experimental and clinical cell culture. It is a turbid, light-yellow liquid that is obtained from human blood platelets after freeze/thaw cycle(s). The freeze/thaw cycle causes the platelets to lyse, releasing a large quantity of growth factors necessary for cell expansion. hPL has the highest concentration of growth factors of any serum supplements. FBS-free cell culture media, e.g. with platelet lysate or chemically defined/ animal component free, are used for cell therapy or regenerative medicine. They are commercially available in GMP (good manufacturing practice)-quality which is generally basis for regulatory approval.

== Process ==
Platelets have a life span of 5 to 9 days. Because of this, the U.S. Food and Drug Administration (FDA) expires transfuse-able platelets 5 days post-collection. Typically, hPL is produced from expired platelets that have been stored in frozen conditions no later than 7 days post-collection.

hPL is created from single or pooled donor-donated platelets isolated from whole blood or by apheresis, distributed in a standard platelet collection bag. There are some differences between hPL manufacturing protocols, but they all share the same core of being frozen at very low temperatures and thawed. This process may be repeated two or three times to cause complete platelet lysis. The resultant hPL can then undergo different manufacturing steps to achieve multiple grades of hPL.

The most common form of hPL undergoes few processing steps, producing a product made of the supernatant following the freeze/thaw process. The included clotting factors require to add heparin to the cell culture media to prevent coagulation during incubation.

Another form of hPL is one that can be used in cell culture without the need of heparin, or any anticoagulant, addition. This grade of hPL goes through further manufacturing steps to inhibit the effect the clotting factors have.

Many labs around the world are creating small amounts of hPL to suit their laboratory needs. The disadvantages of this process are: cost and consistency. When creating small batches of hPL (single or few donors pooled), the lot-to-lot consistency of the hPL becomes variable. Large-scale manufacturing by pooling many platelet donors is a necessity to mitigate the donor-to-donor variability. Consistency is a top priority for experimental designs to provide reproducible results.

Platelet lysate is commonly used for supplementation of basal media in mesenchymal stem cells culture. Prior to use, the pathogen inactivation process is recommended to prevent pathogen transmission.

== Global sales ==
Human platelet lysate is available commercially through AventaCell BioMedical, Captivate Bio, EliteCell Biomedical Corps, Elk Bioscience, Mill Creek Life Sciences, Compass Biomedical, Inc., Sexton Biotechnologies, Macopharma SA, iBiologics, PL BioScience GmbH, Life Science Group Ltd (UK) and Trinova Biochem GmbH under the product lines UltraGRO, PLTMax, PLUS, Stemulate, Human Platelet Lysate, XcytePlus, PLSOLUTION, PLMATRIX and CRUX RUFA Media Supplements. Platelet lysate has also been produced with non-human animal material and has been made commercially available by Agulos Biotech (porcine) and Japan Biomedical (bovine). Some companies provide different grades of platelet lysate including GMP versions and clinical grade for use in human clinical trials. Platelet lysate offers a true human-based recombinant protein platform. Platelet lysate has been tested in various cell culture applications including use in advanced bioreactor systems.

== See also ==
- Laboratory use of serum
