= YPD =

YPD may refer to:

- YEPD, or YPD, a growth medium for yeast
- YPD, a designation for floating pile driver craft of the United States Navy

== See also ==
- Yamla Pagla Deewana, a 2011 Bollywood film
