= Cystine–lactose–electrolyte-deficient agar =

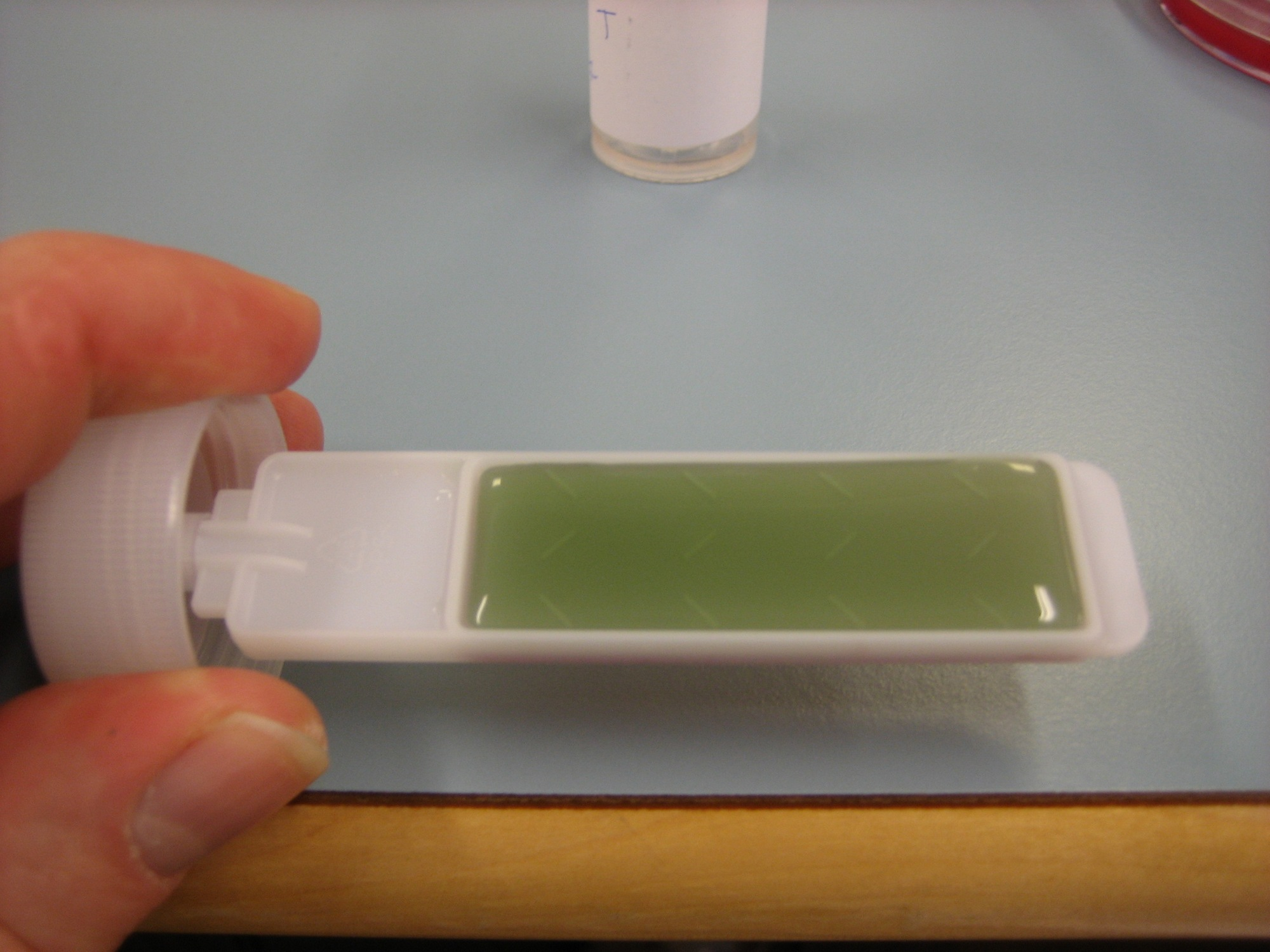
A clear CLED agar plate after cultivation

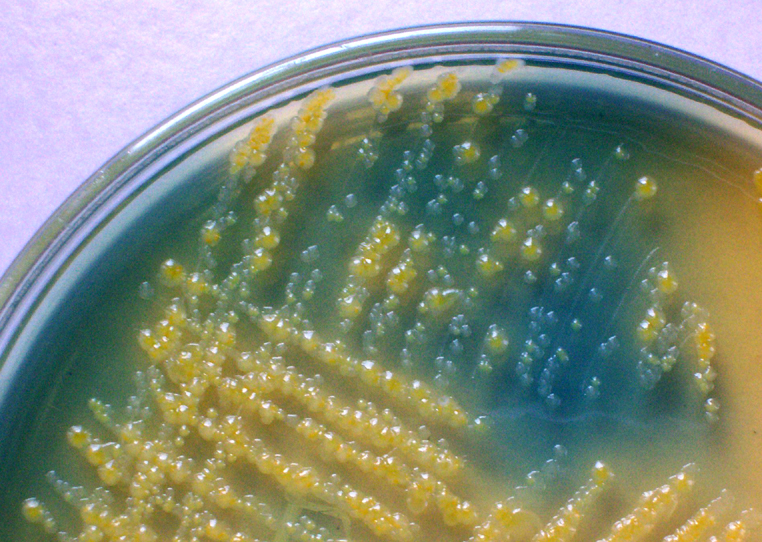
Colonies of lactose and non-lactose fermenting bacteria on CLED agar

CLED agar (cystine–lactose–electrolyte-deficient agar or medium) is a valuable non-inhibitory growth medium used in the isolation and differentiation of urinary microbes. It contains cystine and lactose and is electrolyte-deficient; the latter trait prevents the swarming of Proteus species. Cystine promotes the formation of cystine-dependent dwarf colonies. Bromothymol blue is the indicator used in the agar, it changes to yellow in case of acid production during fermentation of lactose or changes to deep blue in case of alkalinization. Lactose-positive bacteria build yellow colonies. Bacteria which decarboxylate L-cystine cause an alkaline reaction and build deep blue colonies.

Peptone	4 g/l
'Lab Lemco' powder	3 g/l
Tryptone	4 g/l
Lactose	10 g/l
L-Cystine	128 mg/l
Bromothymol blue	20 mg/l
Agar No. 1	15 g/l
