= HIS-selective medium =

HIS-selective medium is a type cell culture medium that lacks the amino acid histidine. It can be used with bacteria reliant on the expression of a gene encoding proteins involved in histidine expression in order to survive. Only bacteria expressing such genes (such as hisB in Escherichia coli and HIS3 in Saccharomyces cerevisiae) will survive on these media.
