= Lab Lemco =

'Lab Lemco' Powder is a refined meat extract known for its light color and has been produced since 1865. It is used in a wide range of bacteriological growth media and has growth-promoting qualities for cell cultivation in laboratories.

Lemco refers to the original producer of the meat extract, the Liebig's Extract of Meat Company.
