= CNA Agar =

Microbiology laboratory media

Columbia Nalidixic Acid (CNA) agar is a growth medium used for the isolation and cultivation of bacteria from clinical and non-clinical specimens. CNA agar contains antibiotics (nalidixic acid and colistin) that inhibit Gram-negative organisms, aiding in the selective isolation of Gram-positive bacteria. Gram-positive organisms that grow on the media can be differentiated on the basis of hemolysis.

== Uses ==
CNA agar is commonly used in clinical microbiology laboratories to isolate pathogenic Gram-positive bacteria such as Staphylococcus, Enterococcus, Streptococcus, diphtheroids, and Listeria from clinical specimens. A common use for CNA agar is commonly used for the detection of Streptococcus agalactiae carriage in pregnant women. It is also effective for the isolation of Gram-positive anaerobes when incubated under anaerobic conditions.

CNA agar is supplemented with sheep blood to facilitate the growth of more fastidious Gram-positive organisms such as Streptococcus and Enterococcus. The sheep blood allows for the presumptive identification of some species of bacteria on the basis of hemolysis. Beta hemolytic organisms such as Staphylococcus aureus and Streptococcus pyogenes will produce colonies surrounded with a clear zone. Alpha hemolytic organisms such as Streptococcus pneumoniae and viridans streptococci will produce colonies surrounded by a light to dark green zone.

Although CNA agar is formulated to select for Gram-positive bacteria, microbiologists working with this media should be aware of its limitations. Gram-negative rods that are resistant to quinolones and polymyxins may grow on the media. Additionally, Candida and other molds are not inhibited by the antibiotics. Gram-positive aerobic spore forming bacteria, such as Bacillus, are also usually inhibited by the media due to being susceptible to the antibiotic.

== Contents ==
The addition of peptones into the agar provides the growth factors required by the bacteria to grow. Casein also provides a source of amino acids for organisms with fastidious growth requirements such as Lactobacillus brevis. It contains the antibiotics colistin and nalidixic acid which inhibit the growth of many gram-negative bacteria.

=== Composition ===
- Casein peptone - 12.0 g
- Meat peptone - 5.0 g
- Sodium chloride - 5.0 g
- Beef extract - 3.0 g
- Yeast extract 3.0 g
- Corn starch 1.0 g
- Colistin - 10.0 mg
- Nalidixic acid - 10.0 mg
- Sheep blood - 5%
- Agar - 13.5 g
- Demineralized water 1000.0 ml

== History ==
CNA agar was developed by Ellner et al. at Columbia university in 1965 while trying to develop an agar base that would enhance the hemolysis of Streptococcus pyogenes.
