= Casein nutrient agar =

Casein nutrient agar (CN) is a growth medium used to culture isolates of lactic acid bacteria such as Streptococcus thermophilus and Lactobacillus bulgaricus. It is composed of standard nutrient agar with the added ingredient of skim milk powder, which contains casein. Lactic Acid Bacteria will precipitate casein out of the agar by lowering the pH. This will produce a cloudy appearance around the colonies that do this. This medium is not regarded as selective as it supports the growth of a wide variety of organisms.
