= Modified Chee's medium =

In cellular biology and microbiology, modified Chee's medium (otherwise known as "MCM") is used to cultivate cells and bacteria. It uses various additives (fat acids, albumins and selenium) to facilitate cellular and bacterial growth.
