= YEPD =

Medium for yeast growth

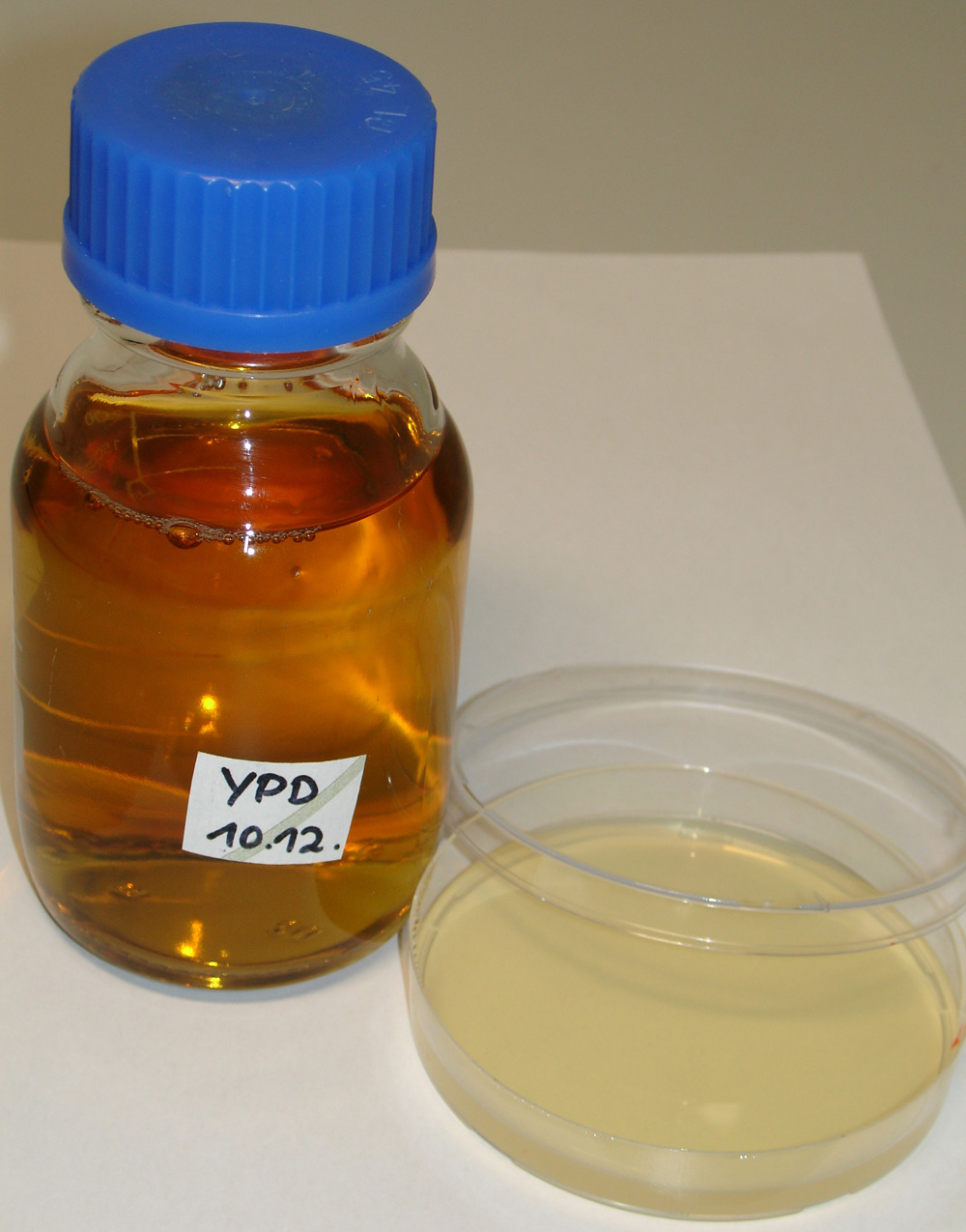
YPD medium bottle and YPD agar plate

YEPD or yeast extract peptone dextrose, also often abbreviated as YPD, is a complete medium for yeast growth. It contains yeast extract, peptone, double-distilled water, and glucose (dextrose). It can be used as solid medium by including agar. The yeast extract will typically contain all the amino acids necessary for growth. By being a complete medium, YEPD cannot be used as a selection medium to test for auxotrophs. Instead, YEPD is used as a growth medium to grow yeast cultures.

YEPD typically contains 1% yeast extract, 2% peptone, and 2% glucose in distilled water. It may be made as a broth, or made into an agar gel by adding 1.5 to 2% agar.
