= Baird-Parker agar =

Selective culture medium

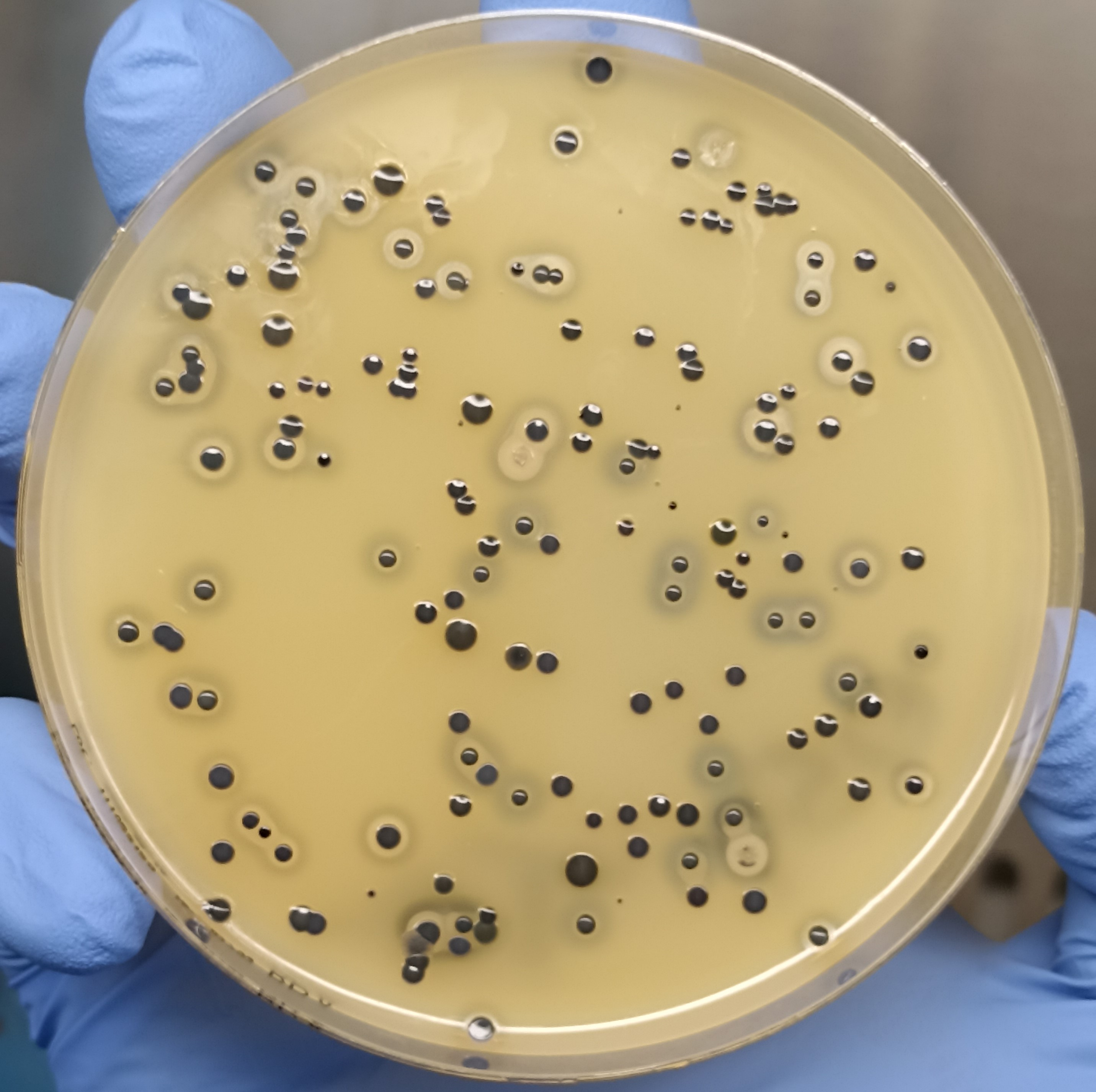
Staphylococcus growth in Baird-Parker (BP) agar.

Baird-Parker agar is a type of agar used for the selective isolation of gram-positive Staphylococci species. It contains lithium chloride and tellurite to inhibit the growth of alternative microbial flora, while the included pyruvate and glycine promote the growth of Staphylococci. Staphylococcus colonies show up black in colour with clear zones produced around them.

== History ==
Baird-Parker Agar From Liofilchem first published an academic article about this agar medium for the purposes of improved diagnostics and isolating coagulase-positive Staphylococci in 1962. He developed this agar medium from the tellurite-glycine formulation of Zebovitz et al and improved its reliability in isolating coagulase-positive staphylococci from foods. Baird-Parker added egg yolk emulsion as a diagnostic agent and sodium pyruvate to protect damaged cells and aid their recovery. It is now widely recommended by national and international bodies for the isolation of coagulase-positive staphylococci. Baird-Parker agar is commonly used as a method for the enumeration of coagulase-positive staphylococci (Staphylococcus aureus and other species) in food and animal feedstuffs.
