= RPMI 1640 =

Artificial complex media

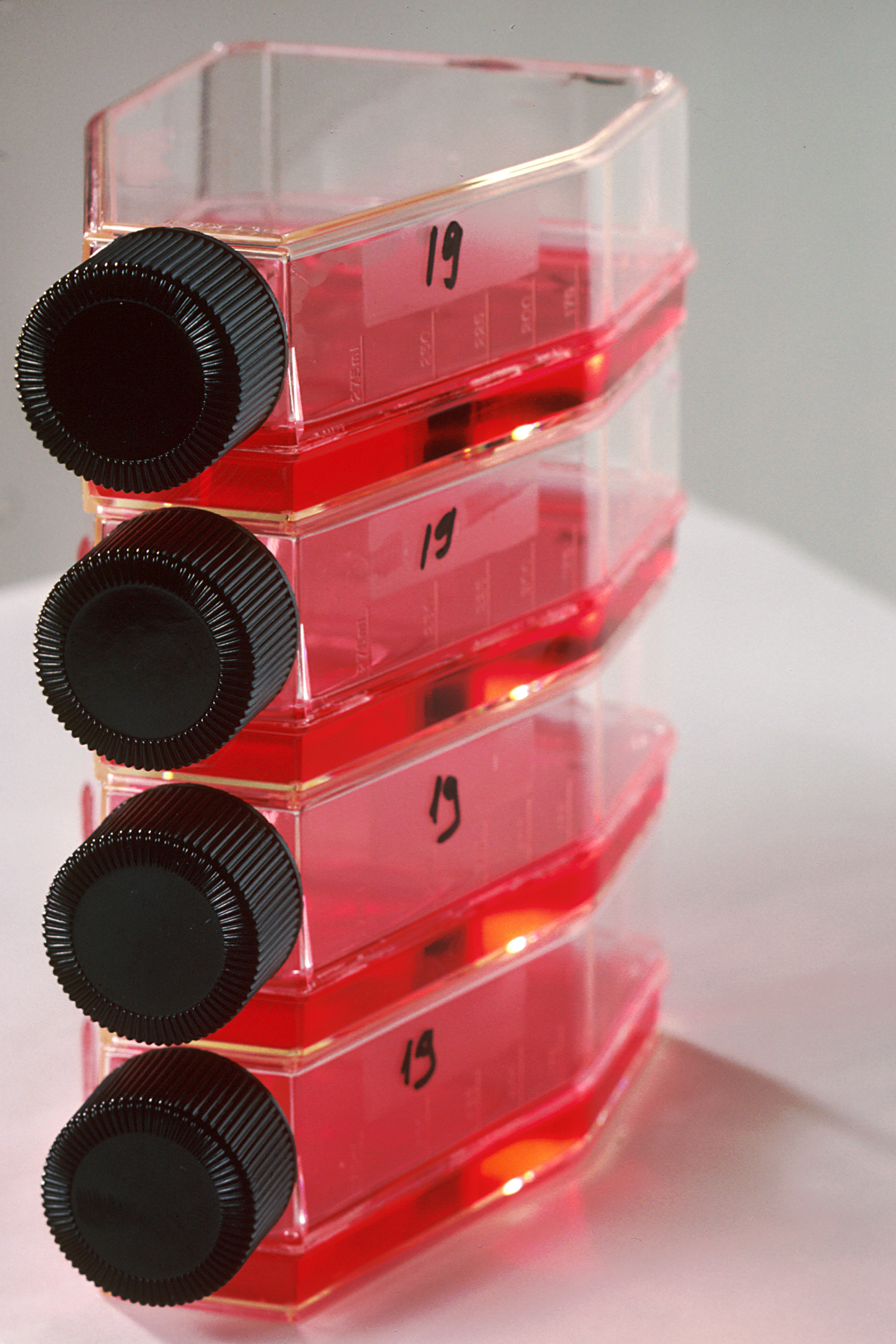
Tissue culture flasks

RPMI 1640, simply known as RPMI medium, is a cell culture medium commonly used to culture mammalian cells. RPMI 1640 was developed by George E. Moore, Robert E. Gerner, and H. Addison Franklin in 1966 at Roswell Park Comprehensive Cancer Center (formerly known as Roswell Park Memorial Institute), from where it derives its name. A modification of McCoy′s 5A medium (or RPMI 1630), it was originally formulated to support lymphoblastoid cells in suspension cultures, but can also support a wide variety of adherent cells.

It was originally developed to culture human leukemic cells. Over the years, the original formulation was modified and refined by researchers and commercial suppliers to enhance its ability to support the growth of many cell types. This medium contains a great deal of phosphate, amino acids and vitamins. RPMI 1640 uses a bicarbonate buffering system and requires a 5–10% CO_{2} atmosphere to maintain physiological pH. Normally, the medium contains no proteins or growth factors, so it is commonly supplemented with 10% fetal bovine serum. Properly supplemented with serum or an adequate serum replacement, RPMI 1640 allows the cultivation of many cell types, especially human lymphocytes, Jurkat cells, HeLa cells, bone marrow cells, hybridomas and carcinomas.

== Composition ==
Many different formulations exist. Typically, one liter of RPMI 1640 contains:

- Glucose (2 g)
- A pH indicator (phenol red, 5 mg)
- Salts (6 g sodium chloride, 2 g sodium bicarbonate, 1.512 g disodium phosphate, 400 mg potassium chloride, 100 mg magnesium sulfate, and 100 mg calcium nitrate)
- Amino acids (300 mg glutamine; 200 mg arginine; 50 mg each asparagine, cystine, leucine, and isoleucine; 40 mg lysine hydrochloride; 30 mg serine; 20 mg each aspartic acid, glutamic acid, hydroxyproline, proline, threonine, tyrosine, and valine; 15 mg each histidine, methionine, and phenylalanine; 10 mg glycine; 5 mg tryptophan; and 1 mg reduced glutathione)
- Vitamins (35 mg i-inositol; 3 mg choline chloride; 1 mg each para-aminobenzoic acid, folic acid, nicotinamide, pyridoxine hydrochloride, and thiamine hydrochloride; 0.25 mg calcium pantothenate; 0.2 mg each biotin and riboflavin; and 0.005 mg cyanocobalamin)
