= Chemically defined medium =

Type of cell growth medium

A chemically defined medium (also known as synthetic medium) is a growth medium suitable for the in vitro cell culture of human or animal cells in which all of the chemical components are known. Standard cell culture media commonly consist of a basal medium supplemented with animal serum (such as fetal bovine serum, FBS) as a source of nutrients and other ill-defined factors. The technical disadvantages to using serum include its undefined nature, batch-to-batch variability in composition, and the risk of contamination.

There is a clear distinction between serum-based media and chemically defined media. Serum-based media may contain undefined animal-derived products such as serum (purified from blood), hydrolysates, growth factors, hormones, carrier proteins, and attachment factors. These undefined animal-derived products will contain complex contaminants, such as the lipid content of albumin. In contrast, chemically defined media require that all of the components must be identified and have their exact concentrations known. Therefore, a chemically defined medium must be entirely free of animal-derived components and cannot contain either fetal bovine serum, bovine serum or human serum. To achieve this, chemically defined media is commonly supplemented with recombinant versions of albumin and growth factors, usually derived from rice or E. coli, or synthetic chemical such as the polymer polyvinyl alcohol which can reproduce some of the functions of BSA/HSA.

The constituents of a chemically defined media include: a basal media (such as DMEM, F12, or RPMI 1640, containing amino acids, vitamins, inorganic salts, buffers, antioxidants and energy sources), which is supplemented with recombinant albumin, chemically defined lipids, recombinant insulin and/or zinc, recombinant transferrin or iron, selenium and an antioxidant thiol such as 2-mercaptoethanol or 1-thioglycerol. Chemically defined media that are designed for the cultivation of cells in suspension additionally contain suitable surfactants such as poloxamers in order to reduce shear stress caused by shaking and stirring.

== The advantages of chemically defined media ==
- Avoidance of batch to batch variation of bovine serum or albumin, which causes inconsistency in growth-promoting properties.
- Low protein content, which can hinder product purification.
- Elimination of the risk of contaminants—viruses, mycoplasma, prions from animal-derived products which may be transmitted to the end product used by humans, e.g., bovine spongiform encephalopathy (BSE) or mad cow disease.
- Elimination of factors that may interfere with hormones or growth factors when studying their interaction with cells.
- Removal of concerns regarding the limited availability of fetal bovine serum, with periods of world shortages.
- Reduced cost: fetal calf serum can account for up to 85% of the overall cost of the medium when calculated for large-scale cultures.
- There are increasing concerns about animal suffering inflicted during serum collection that add an ethical imperative to move away from the use of serum wherever possible.

Chemically defined media also allows researchers who are studying in the field of cell physiology (especially extracellular) and or molecule–cell interactions to eliminate any variables that may arise due to the effects of unknown components in the medium.

== Classes of media ==
Animal culture media can be divided into six subsets based on the level of defined media (Jayme and Smith, 2000): From lowest definition to highest these are:

- Serum-containing media (commonly 10-20% FBS)
- Reduced-serum media (commonly 1-5% FBS)
- Serum-free media (synonymous with Defined media)
- Protein-free media (no protein but contains undefined peptides from plant hydrolysates)
- Chemically-defined media (with only recombinant proteins and/or hormones)
- Protein-free, chemically defined media (contains only low molecular weight constituents, but can contain synthetic peptides/hormones)
- Peptide-free, protein-free chemically defined media (contains only low molecular weight constituents)

== Misuse of the term chemically defined media ==
The term chemically defined media is often misused in the literature to refer to serum albumin-containing media. The term 'defined media' can also be used to describe this type of media. Media formulations containing the media supplement B27 (supplied by Invitrogen) are often erroneously referred to as chemically defined media (e.g. Yao et al., 2006) despite this product containing bovine serum albumin (Chen et al., 2008) using the above definitions this type of media is referred to as serum-free media. Peptide-free, protein-free, chemically defined media are rarely successfully formulated except for CHO and insect cells.

== Other variants of serum-free/defined media include ==
Animal protein-free media, containing human serum albumin, human transferrin, but potentially animal-derived insulin and lipids.

Xeno-free media, containing human serum albumin, human transferrin, human insulin, and chemically defined lipids.

== See also ==
- Biological immortality
- Cell culture assays
- Microphysiometry
- Organ culture
- Plant tissue culture
- Tissue culture
