= BAF agar =

Agar media containing peptones

BAF agar or biotin-aneurin-folic acid agar is a type of agar growth medium containing peptones. It is used to grow cultures of mycorrhizal fungi. It was first described by A.J.P. Oort in Nutritional requirements of Lactarius species and cultural characters in relation to taxonomy in 1981. The acidic pH (5.8-6.3) of BAF agar inhibits bacterial growth.

== Typical composition ==
BAF agar typically contains:

- 30.0 g/L glucose
- 2.0 g/L peptone
- 0.2 g/L yeast extract
- 0.5 g/L KH_{2}PO_{4}
- 0.5 g/L MgSO_{4}.7 H_{2}O
- 10.0 mg/L FeCl_{3}.6 H_{2}O
- 1.0 mg/L ZnSO_{4}.7 H_{2}O
- 5.0 mg/L MnSO_{4}
- 100.0 mg/L CaCl_{2}.2 H_{2}O
- 50.0 μg/L thiamine HCl
- 1.0 μg/L biotin
- 100.0 μg/L folic acid
- 50.0 μg/L inositol
- 15 g/L agar
