= Fetal bovine serum =

Widely used serum-supplement for cell culture

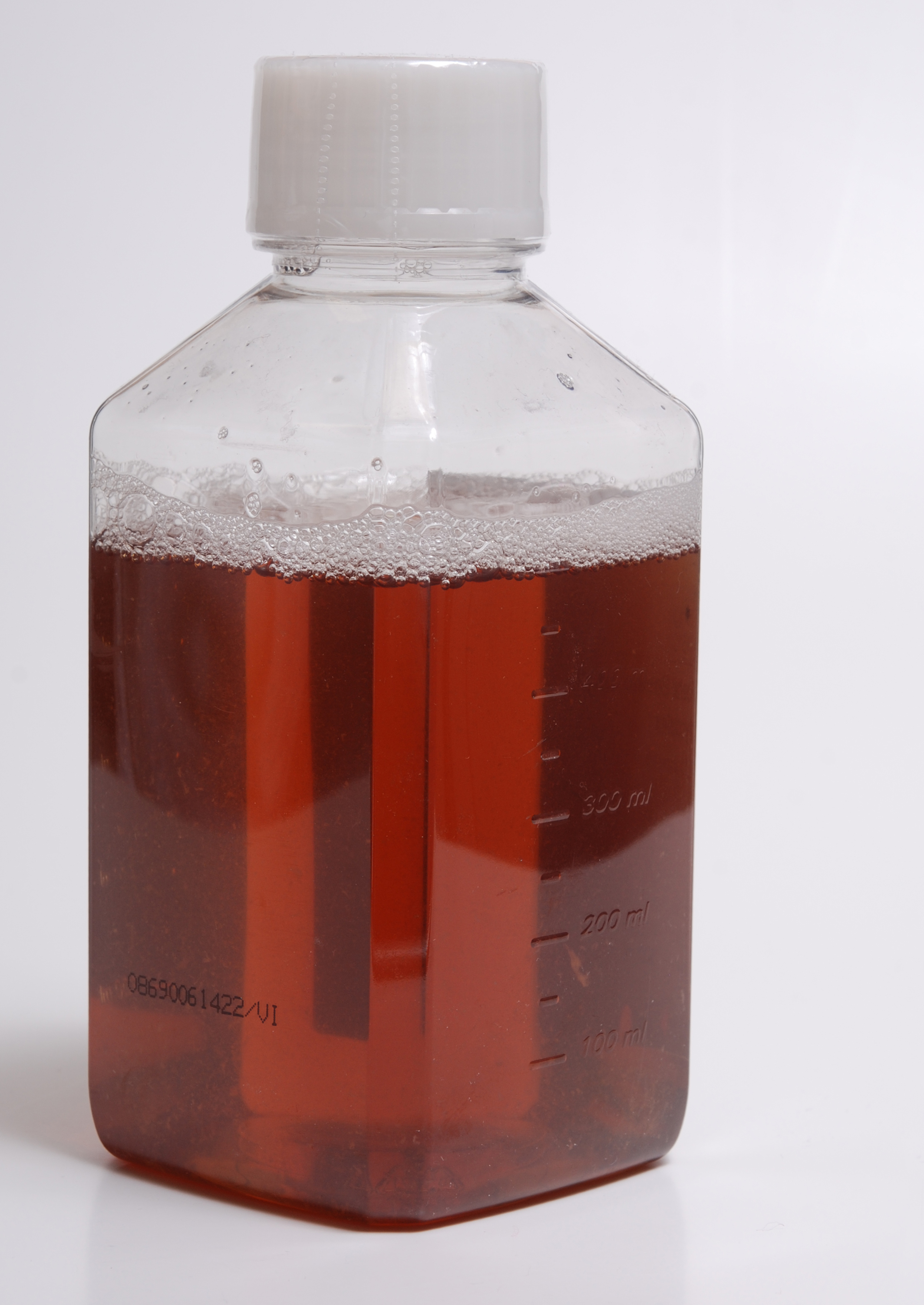
Bottle of FBS for cell culture

Fetal bovine serum (FBS) is the most widely used serum-supplement for the in vitro cell culture of eukaryotic cells. It is commonly utilized in biomedical research, pharmaceutical development, and biomanufacturing due to its ability to support a wide variety of cell types. This is due to it having a very low level of antibodies and containing more growth factors, allowing for versatility in many cell culture applications. Fetal bovine serum is derived from the blood drawn from a bovine fetus via a closed system of collection at the slaughterhouse.

The globular protein bovine serum albumin (BSA) is a major component of fetal bovine serum. It plays a crucial role in maintaining osmotic balance and transporting molecules within the culture medium. Besides BSA, fetal bovine serum is a rich source of growth and attachment factors, lipids, hormones, nutrients and electrolytes necessary to support cell growth in culture. It is typically added to basal cell culture medium, such as DMEM or RPMI, at a 5–10% concentration.

Because it is a biological product, FBS is not a fully defined media component, and as such varies in composition between batches. As a result of this and in an attempt to minimize the possibility of transfer of adventitious agents, serum-free and chemically defined media (CDM) have been developed. However, the effectiveness of serum-free media is limited as many cell lines still require serum in order to grow, and many serum-free media formulations can only support the growth of narrowly defined types of cells.

== Production ==
FBS is a by-product of the meat industry. FBS, as with the vast majority of animal serum used in cell culture, is produced from blood collected at commercial slaughterhouses from cattle that also supply meat intended for human consumption.

The first stage of the production process for FBS is the harvesting of blood from the bovine fetus after the fetus is removed from the slaughtered cow. The fetus dies from the lack of oxygen by remaining in the protective environment of the uterus for a minimum of 15–20 minutes after the cow is dead. The normal method of collection is cardiac puncture. This minimizes the danger of serum contamination with micro-organisms from the fetus itself, and the environment, while maximizing the volume of blood collected. The collected blood is then transferred to a sterile container or blood bag, where it is left to clot naturally before further processing. The clotting process separates the cellular components from the serum, producing a clear, straw-colored liquid. The serum is frozen prior to further processing that is necessary to make it suitable for cell culture.

The second stage of processing involves filtration, typically using a filtration chain with the final filtration being three sterile 0.1 micron membrane filters. The aseptically processed FBS is subjected to stringent quality control testing and is supplied with a detailed Certificate of Analysis. The certificate gives full test results and information concerning the origin of the serum. Certificates of Analysis vary between commercial suppliers, but each usually includes the following details: filtration statement, country of blood collection, country of manufacture, cell growth performance testing, microbial sterility testing, as well as screening for mycoplasma and virus, endotoxin, hemoglobin, IgG gamma glutamyl transferase and total protein assays. FBS may also be tested for country of collection.

== Ethics ==
Ethical questions have been raised regarding the blood collection process due to the potential suffering caused to the fetus. There has been discussion with concerns regarding fetal suffering, humane treatment, and transparency in the collection process. The International Serum Industry Association (ISIA) has published literature providing detail on the extensive regulation and processes employed to ensure that serum is collected in an ethical manner. Although the act of slaughter of the dam and the time which passes in the slaughter process prior to harvesting will induce unconsciousness or death of the fetus prior to serum harvesting, it has been postulated that exposure of live unborn calves to oxygen could cause them to gain awareness before being killed, resulting in active debate about the ethics of harvesting serum. While the Industry Association accepts that certain organizations have concerns, they maintain that all collections of serum take place under veterinary supervision in registered slaughterhouses controlled by the competent authority in the country of collection. Major concerns include the ethical implications of sourcing from unborn calves.

=== Bovine embryo cultures ===
While the serum increases blastocyst yield, it contains factors that can affect DNA methylation and cause fetal overgrowth that disrupts normal fetal development, leading to oversized, non-viable offspring caused by high levels of rumen-degradable nitrogen in the maternal diet and somatic cell coculture, which can lead to genetic syndromes, such as Large offspring syndrome (LOS), which also causes hypoglycemia, enlarged organs and tongues, stillbirths, and miscarriages. Other technical risks include undefined components (leading to batch-to-batch variation), the potential for contamination (e.g., mycoplasma, viruses), and high costs. To prevent this, it is recommended to minimize or eliminate the serum and use chemically defined serum-free media that can help reduce the risk.

== Serum use ==
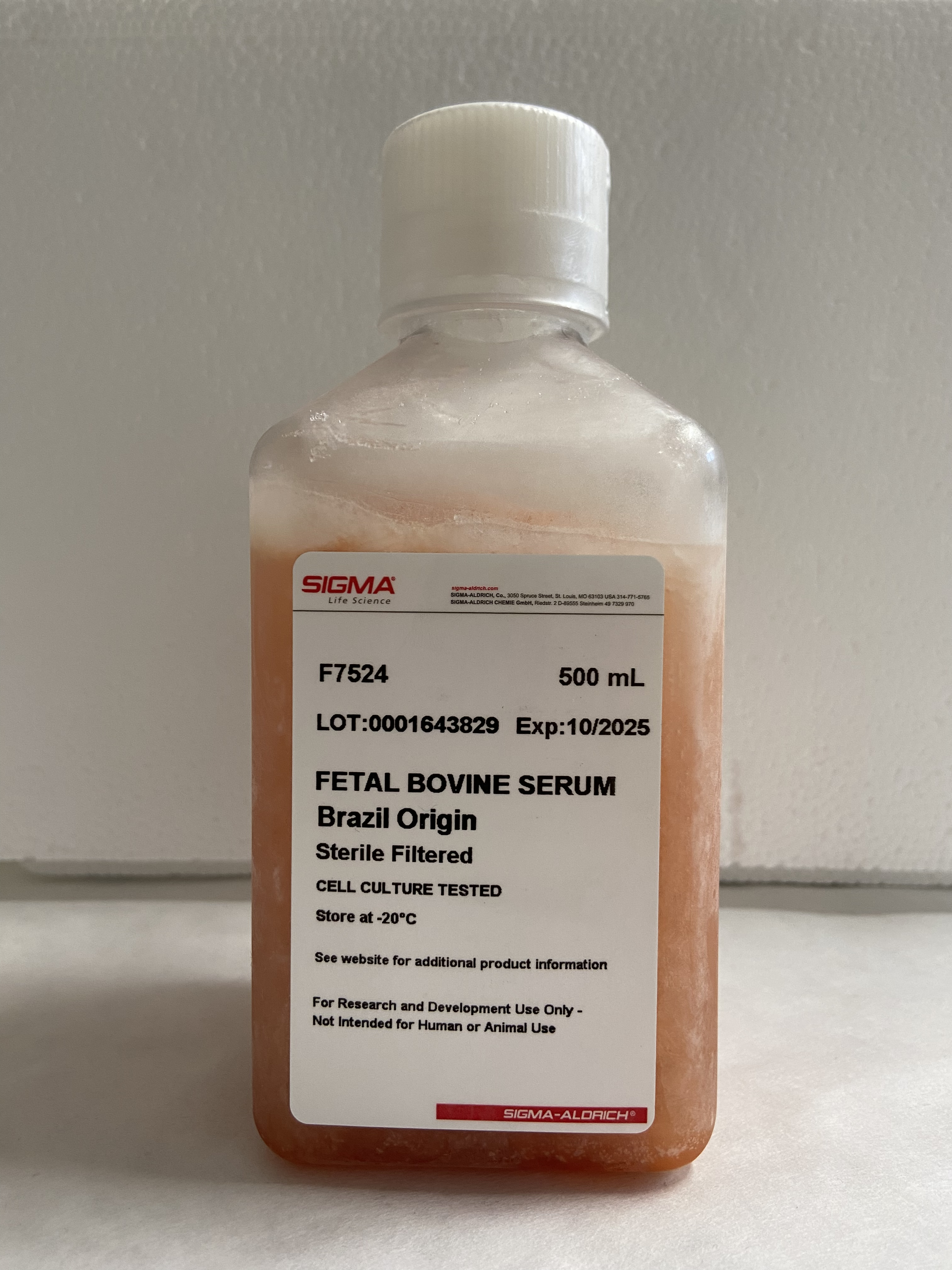
Frozen fetal bovine serum

Fetal bovine serum is commercially available from many manufacturers, and because cells grown in vitro are highly sensitive, customers usually test specific batches to check for suitability for their specific cell type. When changing from batch to batch it is usual to adapt the cells to the new batch of material, for example, by mixing 50% of the old serum with 50% of the new serum and allowing the cells to acclimatize to the new material.

Serum is stored frozen to preserve the stability of components such as growth factors. When serum is thawed, some precipitation may be seen. This is a normal phenomenon, and it does not compromise the quality of serum in any way. The precipitate may be removed by transferring the serum to sterile tubes and centrifuging for 5 minutes at 400 × g. To limit the amount of precipitation, it is recommended that the serum is thawed in a refrigerator at 2-8˚C. The serum should be regularly stirred during this process. Repeated freeze/thaw cycles should be avoided, and it is advisable to dispense the serum into single use aliquots before freezing.

== Source history ==
Serum produced for use in the biotechnology industry and research sectors is highly regulated. The collection and movement of all animal derived products globally is strictly controlled. Veterinary control of animal derived products largely follows the regulations set by the EU (DG SANCO) and the US (USDA). The current regulation governing the importation of animal by-products into the EU is covered by Regulation (EU) 1069/2009 and the implementation document Regulation (EU) 142/2011.

FBS is a product collected worldwide with the main collections being centered in the United States, Australia, New Zealand, Canada, Central America, South America, and Europe.

== Global sales ==
A 2012 source estimates that about 600,000 liters are made annually, one third of which is suitable for pharmaceutical use under Good Manufacturing Practice. 1 to 3 fetuses are required to produce one liter of serum. In 2018, the annual production of FBS was estimated at 800,000 liters. Of these, 200,000 liters are estimated to be produced in the US. The demand for FBS remains high due to its critical role in biopharmaceutical research and vaccine production, despite growing interest in serum-free alternatives. However, serum is still almost exclusively produced as a by-product as it is not economically feasible to breed cattle just for serum production. The market price of one liter of FBS is around $250. Market fluctuations, regulatory policies, and ethical concerns continue to shape production and pricing trends worldwide.

== Replacements ==
Proposed replacements for FBS include:

- Bovine ocular fluid, also a byproduct of slaughterhouses. Also contains a variety of mammalian growth factors.
- Hydrolyzed sericin, a normally discarded byproduct of silk production. Also supports the growth of skin cells.
- Human platelet lysate (HPL), which can be produced from old stock from blood banks. Contains a variety of mammalian growth factors. Human adipose tissue grows better in HPL than in FBS.
- Earthworm heat inactivated coelomic fluid, which acts like "blood" in earthworms. Rich in nutrients and growth hormones. Does not contain fibronectin, so an attachment factor must be added.

== See also ==
- Chemically defined medium
