= MMN medium =

Agar media

MMN medium or Modified Melin-Norkrans medium is a type of agar growth medium, used to grow cultures of mycorrhizal fungi, such as Boletus edulis and Tricholoma matsutake. It was first described by DH. Marx in The influence of ectotrophic mycorrhizal fungi on the resistance of pine roots to pathogenic infections. I. Antagonism of mycorrhizal fungi to root pathogenic fungi and soil bacteria in 1969. The acidic pH (5.6) of MMN agar inhibits bacterial growth.

== Typical composition ==
MMN agar typically contains:

- 10 g/L glucose
- 3 g/L malt extract
- 0.25 g/L (NH_{4})_{2}HPO_{4}
- 0.025 g/L NaCl
- 0.5 g/L KH_{2}PO_{4}
- 0.05 g/L CaCl_{2}
- 0.15 g/L MgSO_{4}.7 H_{2}O
- 0.012g/L FeCl_{3}. 6 H_{2}O
- 0.003 g/L thiamine
- 15 g/L agar
