= Staphylotoxin =

A staphylotoxin can be any of these toxins produced by Staphylococcus bacteria:

- Staphylococcus aureus alpha toxin
- Staphylococcus aureus beta toxin
- Staphylococcus aureus delta toxin
- Staphylococcal Enterotoxin B
- Exfoliatin
- Panton-Valentine leukocidin
- Toxic shock syndrome toxin
