= Isolation (microbiology) =

Separation of a strain from a mixed population of microbes

In microbiology, isolation is the technique of separating one strain from a mixed population of living microorganisms. This allows identification of microorganisms in a sample taken from the environment, such as water or soil, or from a person or animal. Laboratory techniques for isolating bacteria and parasites were developed during the 19th century, and for viruses during the 20th century.

== History ==
The laboratory techniques of isolating microbes first developed during the 19th century in the field of bacteriology and parasitology using light microscopy. 1860 marked the successful introduction of liquid medium by Louis Pasteur. The liquid culture pasteur developed allowed for the visualization of promoting or inhibiting growth of specific bacteria. This same technique is utilized today through various mediums like Mannitol salt agar, a solid medium. Solid cultures were developed in 1881 when Robert Koch solidified the liquid media through the addition of agar

Proper isolation techniques of virology did not exist prior to the 20th century. The methods of microbial isolation have drastically changed over the past 50 years, from a labor perspective with increasing mechanization, and in regard to the technologies involved, and with it speed and accuracy.

== General techniques ==
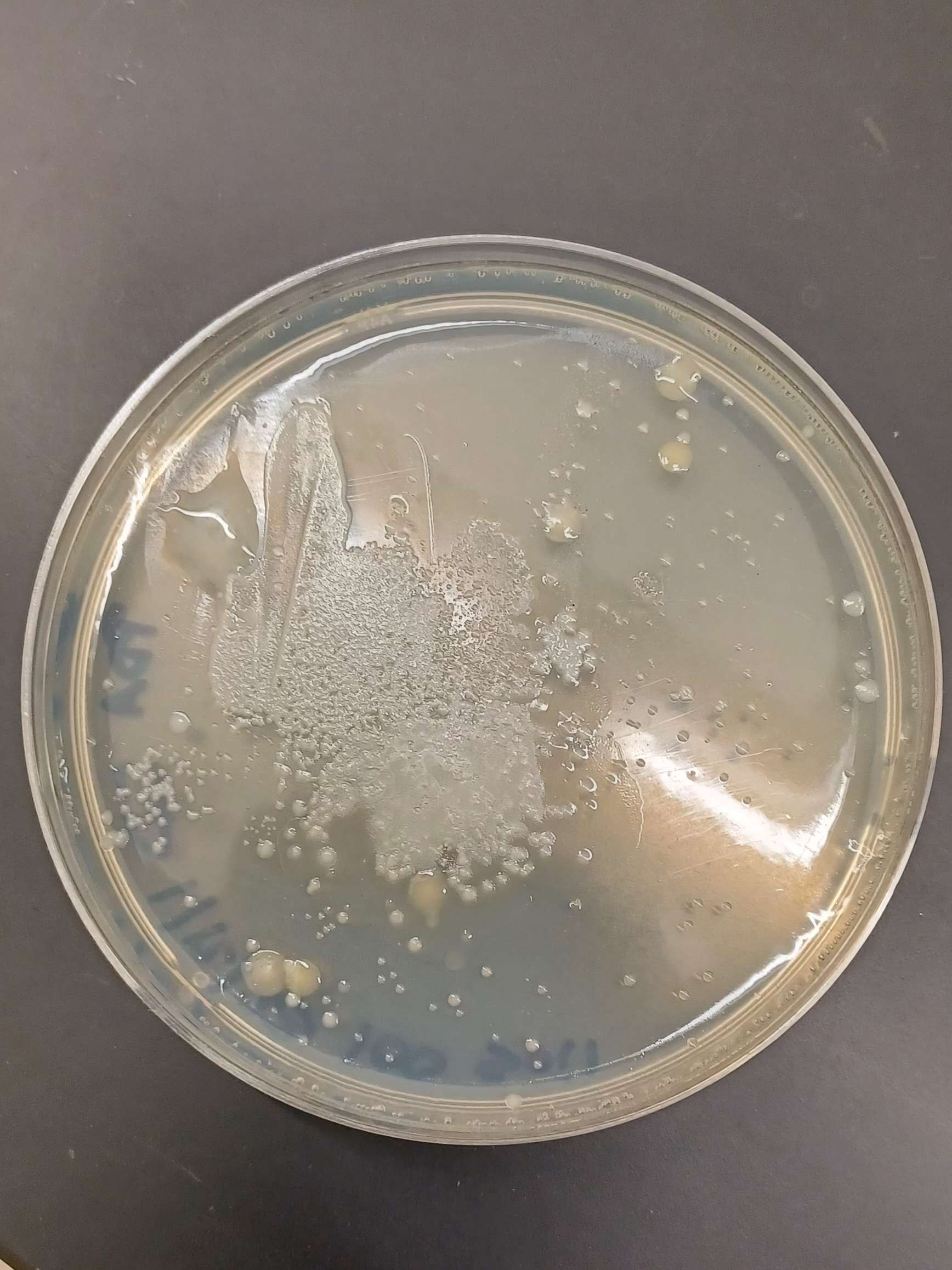
Bacteria extracted from soil sample.

In order to isolate a microbe from a natural, mixed population of living microbes, as present in the environment, for example in water or soil flora, or from living beings with skin flora, oral flora or gut flora, one has to separate it from the mix.

Traditionally microbes have been cultured in order to identify the microbe(s) of interest based on its growth characteristics. Depending on the expected density and viability of microbes present in a liquid sample, physical methods to increase the gradient as for example serial dilution or centrifugation may be chosen. In order to isolate organisms in materials with high microbial content, such as sewage, soil or stool, serial dilutions will increase the chance of separating a mixture.

In a liquid medium with few or no expected organisms, from an area that is normally sterile (such as CSF, blood inside the circulatory system) centrifugation, decanting the supernatant and using only the sediment will increase the chance to grow and isolate bacteria or the usually cell-associated viruses.

If one expects or looks for a particularly fastidious organism, the microbiological culture and isolation techniques will have to be geared towards that microbe. For example, a bacterium that dies when exposed to air, can only be isolated if the sample is carried and processed under airless or anaerobic conditions. A bacterium that dies when exposed to room temperature (thermophilic) requires a pre-warmed transport container, and a microbe that dries and dies when carried on a cotton swab will need a viral transport medium before it can be cultured successfully.

== Bacterial and fungal culture ==
=== Inoculation ===
Laboratory technicians inoculate the sample onto certain solid agar plates with the streak plate method or into liquid culture medium, depending what the objective of the isolation is:

- If one wants to isolate only a particular group of bacteria, such as Group A Streptococcus from a throat swab, one can use a selective medium that will suppress the growth of concomitant bacteria expected in the mix (by antibiotics present in the agar), so that only Streptococci are "selected", i.e. visibly stand out. To isolate fungi, Sabouraud agar can be used. Alternatively, lethal conditions for streptococci and gram negative bacteria like high salt concentrations in Mannitol salt agar favor survival of any staphylococci present in a sample of gut bacteria, and phenol red in the agar acts as a ph indicator showing if the bacteria are able to ferment mannitol by excreting acid into the medium. In other agar substances are added to exploit an organism's ability to produce a visible pigment (e.g. granada medium for Group B Streptococcus) which changes the bacterial colony's color, or to dissolve blood agar by hemolysis so that they can be more easily spotted. Some bacteria like Legionella species require particular nutrients or toxin binding as in charcoal to grow and therefore media such as Buffered charcoal yeast extract agar must be used.
- If one wants to isolate as many or all strains possible, different nutrient media as well as enriched media, such as blood agar and chocolate agar and anaerobic culture media such as thioglycolate broth need to be inoculated. To enumerate the growth, bacteria can be suspended in molten agar before it becomes solid, and then poured into petri dishes, the so-called 'pour plate method' which is used in environmental microbiology and food microbiology (e.g. dairy testing) to establish the so-called 'aerobic plate count'.

=== Incubation ===
After the sample is inoculated into or onto the choice media, they are incubated under the appropriate atmospheric settings, such as aerobic, anaerobic or microaerophilic conditions or with added carbon dioxide (5%), at different temperature settings, for example 37 °C in an incubator or in a refrigerator for cold enrichment, under appropriate light, for example strictly without light wrapped in paper or in a dark bottle for scotochromogen mycobacteria, and for different lengths of time, because different bacteria grow at a different speed, varying from hours (Escherichia coli) to weeks (e.g. mycobacteria).

At regular, serial intervals laboratory technicians and microbiologists inspect the media for signs of visible growth and record it. The inspection again has to occur under conditions favoring the isolate's survival, i.e. in an 'anaerobic chamber' for anaerobe bacteria for example, and under conditions that do not threaten the person looking at the plates from being infected by a particularly infectious microbe, i.e. under a biological safety cabinet for Yersinia pestis (plague) or Bacillus anthracis (anthrax) for example.

=== Identification ===
When bacteria have visibly grown, they are often still mixed. The identification of a microbe depends upon the isolation of an individual colony, as biochemical testing of a microbe to determine its different physiological features depends on a pure culture. To make a subculture, one again works in aseptic technique in microbiology, lifting a single colony off the agar surface with a loop and streaks the material into the 4 quadrants of an agar plate or all over if the colony was singular and did not look mixed.

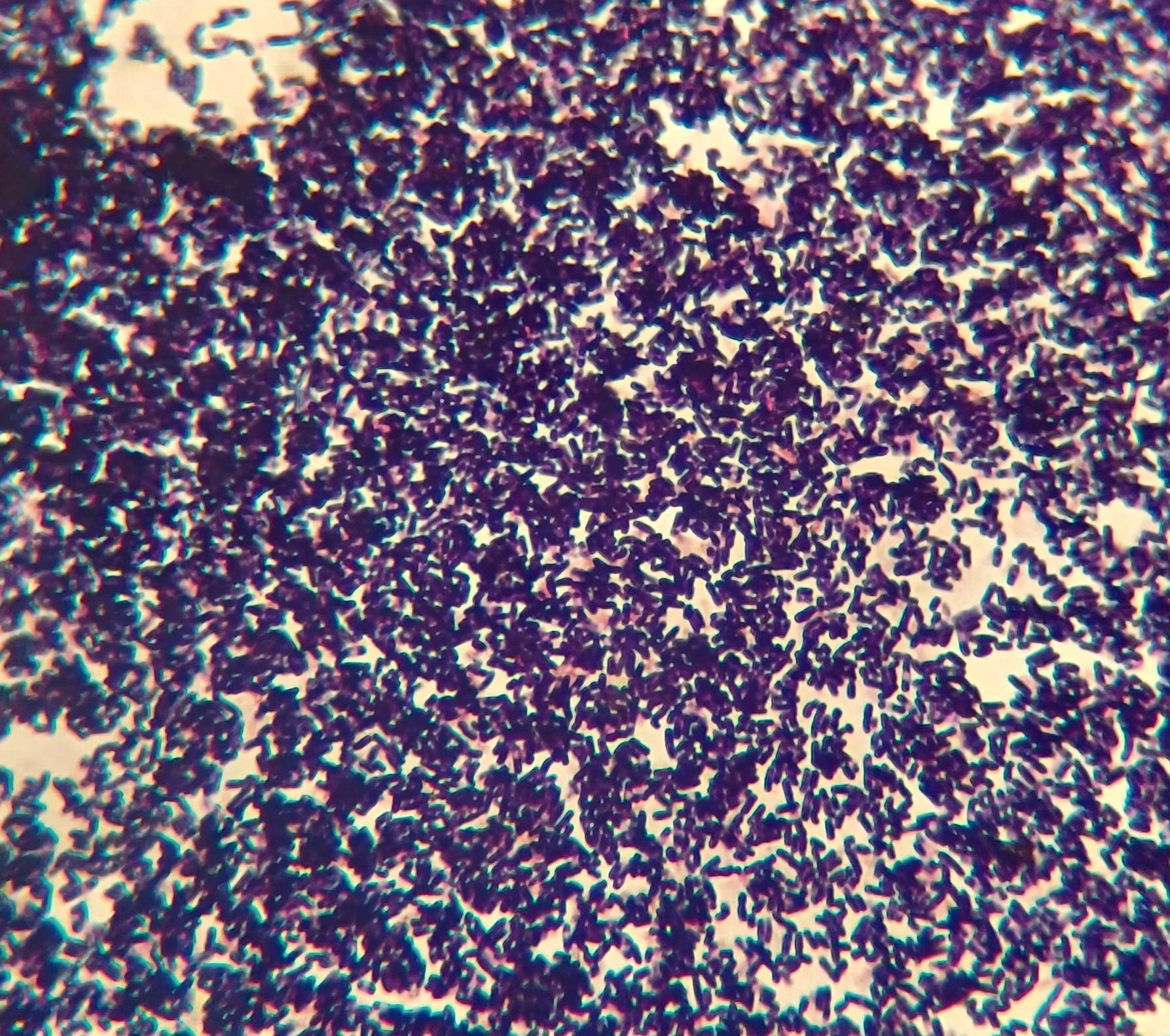
Example of gram staining on a gram positive rod.

Gram staining allows for visualization of the bacteria's cell wall composition based on the color the bacteria stains after a series of staining and decolorization steps. This staining process allows for the identification of gram-negative and gram positive bacteria. Gram-negative bacteria will stain a pink color due to the thin layer of peptidoglycan. If a bacteria stains purple, due to the thick layer of peptidoglycan, the bacteria is a gram-positive bacteria.

In clinical microbiology numerous other staining techniques for particular organisms are used (acid fast bacterial stain for mycobacteria). Immunological staining techniques, such as direct immunofluorescence have been developed for medically important pathogens that are slow growing (Auramine-rhodamine stain for mycobacteria) or difficult to grow (such as Legionella pneumophila species) and where the test result would alter standard management and empirical therapy.

Biochemical testing of bacteria involves a set of agars in vials to separate motile from non-motile bacteria. In 1970 a miniaturized version was developed, called the analytical profile index.

Successful identification via e.g. genome sequencing and genomics depends on pure cultures.

== Culture-independent identification of bacteria ==
The most rapid method to identify bacteria is by sequencing their 16S rRNA gene after amplification by polymerase chain reaction (PCR), which method does not require isolation. Since most bacteria cannot be grown with conventional methods (particularly environmental or soil bacteria) metagenomics or metatranscriptomics are used, shotgun sequencing or PCR directed sequencing of the genome. Sequencing with mass spectrometry as in Matrix-assisted laser desorption/ionization (MALDI-TOF MS) is used in the analysis of clinical specimens to look for pathogens. Whole genome sequencing is an option for a singular organism that cannot be sufficiently characterized for identification. Small DNA microarrays can also be used for identification.
