= Mannitol motility medium =

Bacterial growth medium

Mannitol motility medium is a bacterial growth medium used to detect the ability of bacteria to ferment mannite and produce nitrogen gas; and to indicate the motility of the organism.

== Composition ==
The typical medium is composed of:

- Agar – 3.0 g/L
- Peptone – 20.0 g/L
- Mannitol – 2.0 g/L
- Potassium nitrate – 1.0 g/L
- 1% Phenol red solution 4 ml/L
- pH: 7.6

== Indications ==
When inoculated with a sample organism and allowed to incubate, the medium will change color from red to yellow to indicate that the mannite has been fermented. The presence of bubbles in the medium indicates the presence of gaseous nitrogen, produced by the organism. The pattern of color change (localized along the inoculation site vs. dispersed throughout the medium) indicates the motility of the organism.

=== Quality control ===
The following known results can be used to validate the proper composition of the medium:

- Escherichia coli – ferments mannite, motile
- Klebsiella sp. – ferments mannite, non-motile
- Pseudomonas aeruginosa – does not ferment mannite, motile
