= RNAIII =

Small RNA

RNAIII is a stable 514 nt regulatory RNA transcribed by the P3 promoter of the Staphylococcus aureus quorum-sensing agr system). It is the major effector of the agr regulon, which controls the expression of many S. aureus genes encoding exoproteins and cell wall associated proteins plus others encoding regulatory proteins The RNAIII transcript also encodes the 26 amino acid δ-haemolysin (Staphylococcus aureus delta toxin) peptide (Hld). RNAIII contains many stem loops, most of which match the Shine-Dalgarno sequence involved in translation initiation of the regulated genes. Some of these interactions are inhibitory, others stimulatory; among the former is the regulatory protein Rot. In vitro, RNAIII is expressed post exponentially, inhibiting translation of the surface proteins, notably protein A, while stimulating that of the exoproteins, many of which are tissue-degrading enzymes or cytolysins. Among the latter is the important virulence factor, α-hemolysin (or alpha toxin) (Hla), whose translation RNAIII activates by preventing the formation of an inhibitory foldback loop in the hla mRNA leader.
