= CRTP =

CRTP has several meanings in computer science.

- Curiously recurring template pattern in the C++ programming language
- Diapolycopene oxygenase, an enzyme
- Cardiac resynchronization therapy pacemaker
