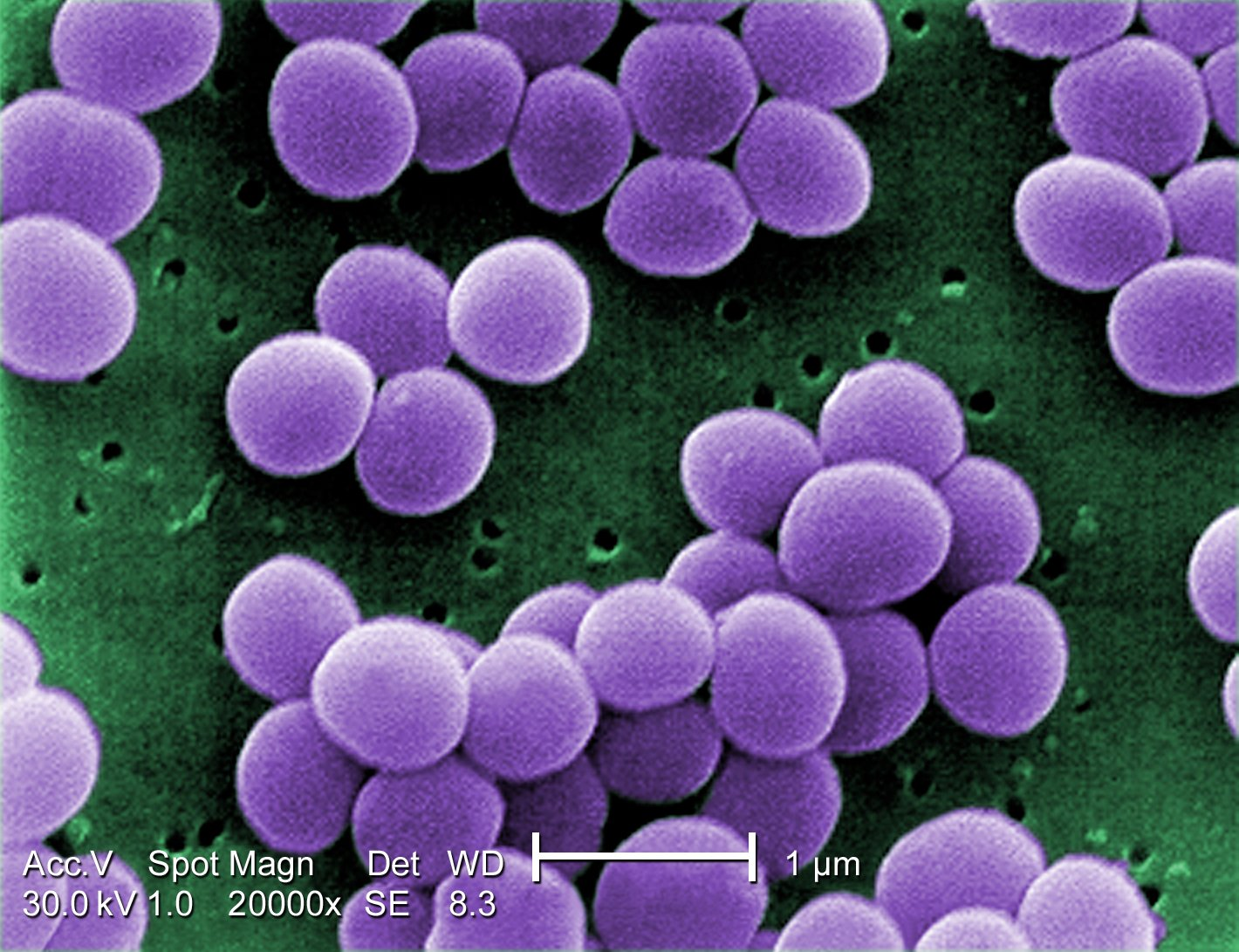
- Scanning electron micrograph of S. aureus; false color added

Scientific classification
- Domain: Bacteria
- Kingdom: Bacillati
- Phylum: Bacillota
- Class: Bacilli
- Order: Caryophanales
- Family: Staphylococcaceae
- Genus: Staphylococcus
- Species: S. aureus

Binomial name
- Staphylococcus aureus Rosenbach 1884

= Staphylococcus aureus =

Species of Gram-positive bacterium

Staphylococcus aureus
- Other names: Staph aureus, S. aureus
- Specialty: Infectious disease
- Types: Methicillin-susceptible Staphylococcus aureus, Methicillin-resistant Staphylococcus aureus
- Causes: Staphylococcus aureus bacteria
- Differential diagnosis: other bacterial, viral and fungal infections,
- Prevention: hand washing, cleaning surfaces
- Medication: Antibiotics
- Frequency: 20% to 30% of the human population often without symptoms

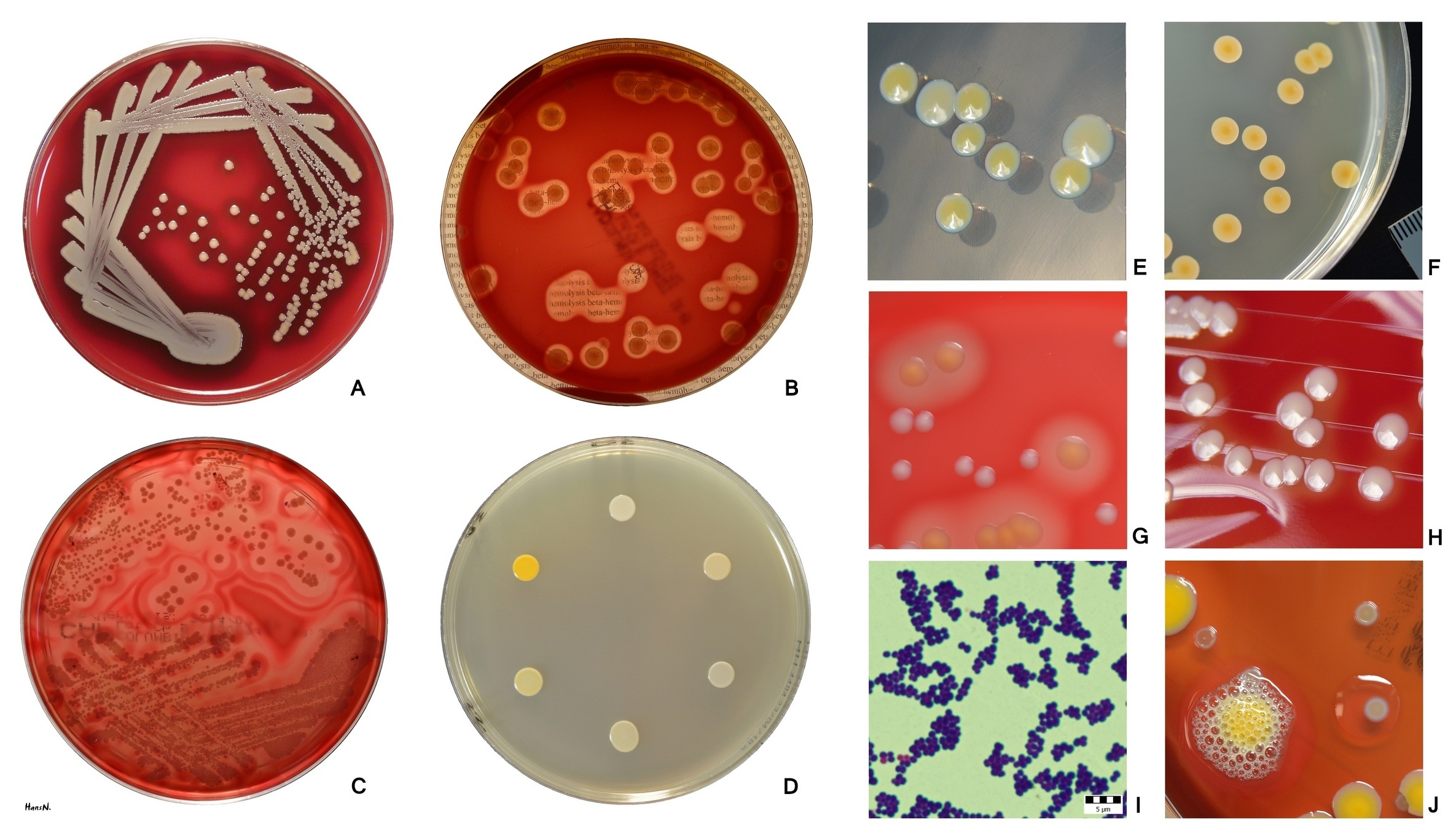
Staphylococcus aureus on basic cultivation media

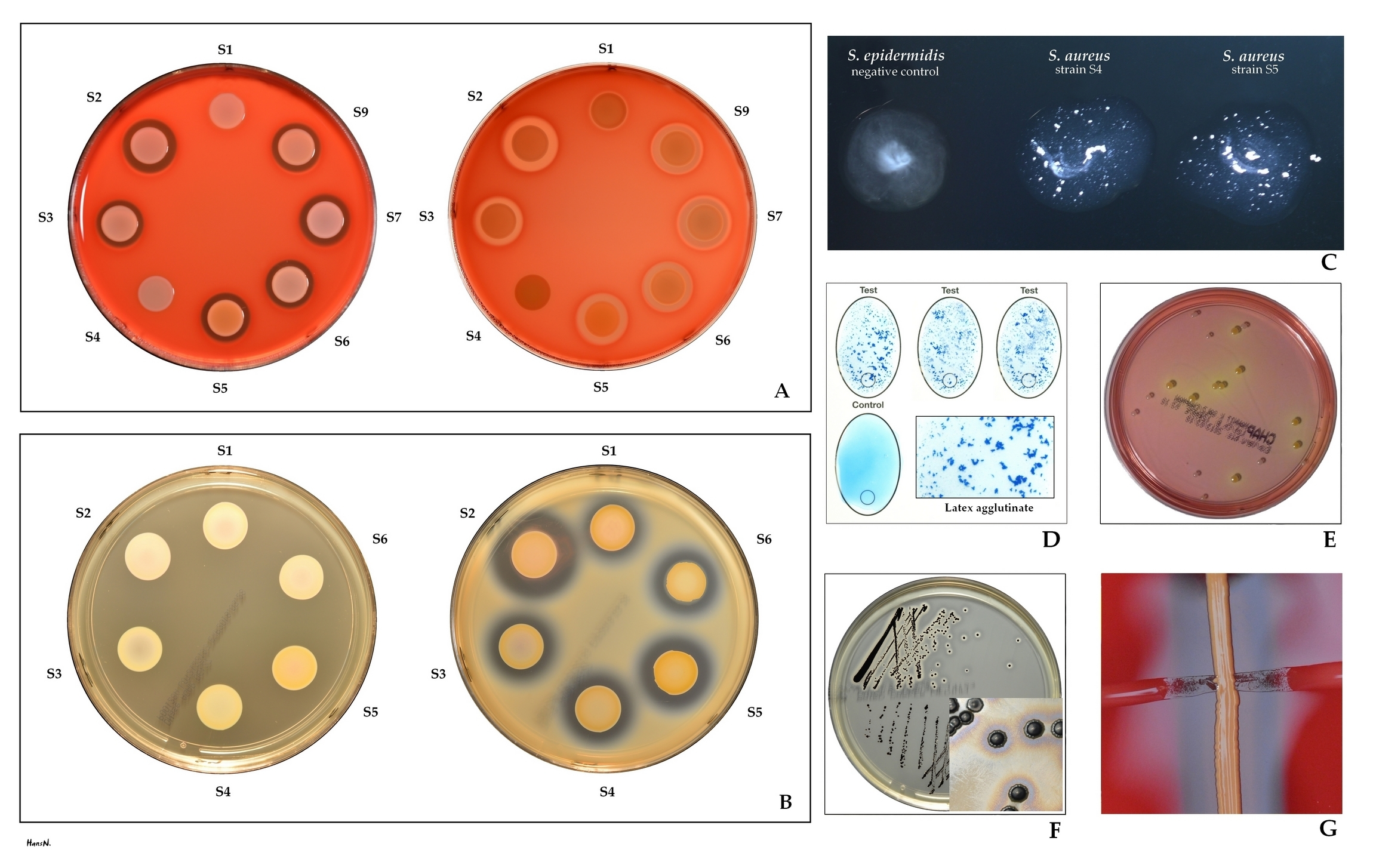
Hemolysis on blood agar, DNase activity, clumping factor, latex agglutination, growth on mannitol-salt and Baird-Parker agar, hyaluronidase production.

Staphylococcus aureus is a gram-positive spherically shaped bacterium, a member of the Bacillota, and is a usual member of the microbiota of the body, frequently found in the upper respiratory tract and on the skin. It is often positive for catalase and nitrate reduction and is a facultative anaerobe, meaning that it can grow without oxygen. Although S. aureus usually acts as a commensal of the human microbiota, it can also become an opportunistic pathogen, being a common cause of skin infections including abscesses, respiratory infections such as sinusitis, and food poisoning. Pathogenic strains often promote infections by producing virulence factors such as potent protein toxins, and the expression of a cell-surface protein that binds and inactivates antibodies. S. aureus is one of the leading pathogens for deaths associated with antimicrobial resistance and the emergence of antibiotic-resistant strains, such as methicillin-resistant S. aureus (MRSA). The bacterium is a worldwide problem in clinical medicine. Despite much research and development, no vaccine for S. aureus has been approved.

An estimated 21% to 30% of the human population are long-term carriers of S. aureus, which can be found as part of the normal skin microbiota, in the nostrils, and as a normal inhabitant of the lower reproductive tract of females. S. aureus can cause a range of illnesses, from minor skin infections, such as pimples, impetigo, boils, cellulitis, folliculitis, carbuncles, scalded skin syndrome, and abscesses, to life-threatening diseases such as pneumonia, meningitis, osteomyelitis, endocarditis, toxic shock syndrome, bacteremia, and sepsis. It is still one of the five most common causes of hospital-acquired infections and often the cause of wound infections following surgery. Each year, around 500,000 hospital patients in the United States contract a staphylococcal infection, chiefly by S. aureus. Up to 50,000 deaths each year in the U.S. are linked to staphylococcal infection.

== History ==
=== Discovery ===
In 1880, Alexander Ogston, a Scottish surgeon, discovered that Staphylococcus can cause wound infections after noticing groups of bacteria in pus from a surgical abscess during a procedure he was performing. He named it Staphylococcus after its clustered appearance evident under a microscope. Then, in 1884, German scientist Friedrich Julius Rosenbach identified Staphylococcus aureus, discriminating and separating it from Staphylococcus albus, a related bacterium. In the early 1930s, doctors began to use a more streamlined test to detect the presence of an S. aureus infection by means of coagulase testing, which detects an enzyme produced by the bacterium. Before the 1940s, S. aureus infections were fatal in most patients. However, doctors discovered that penicillin could cure S. aureus infections. Unfortunately, by the end of the 1940s, penicillin resistance became widespread amongst this bacterium population and outbreaks of the resistant strain began to occur.

=== Evolution ===
Staphylococcus aureus can be sorted into ten dominant human lineages. There are numerous minor lineages as well, but these are not seen in the population as often. Genomes of bacteria within the same lineage are mostly conserved, except for mobile genetic elements. Mobile genetic elements that are common in S. aureus include bacteriophages, pathogenicity islands, plasmids, transposons, and staphylococcal cassette chromosomes. These elements have enabled S. aureus to evolve and acquire new traits continually. There is a great deal of genetic variation within the S. aureus species. A study by Fitzgerald et al. (2001) revealed that approximately 22% of the S. aureus genome is non-coding and thus can differ from bacterium to bacterium. An example of this difference is seen in the species' virulence. Only a few strains of S. aureus are associated with infections in humans. This demonstrates that there is a large range of infectious ability within the species.

It has been proposed that one possible reason for the significant heterogeneity within the species could be due to its reliance on heterogeneous infections. This occurs when multiple different types of S. aureus cause an infection within a host. Strains can secrete different enzymes or bring different antibiotic resistances to the group, increasing their pathogenic ability. Thus, there is a need for a large number of mutations and acquisitions of mobile genetic elements.

Another notable evolutionary process within the S. aureus species is its co-evolution with its human hosts. Over time, this parasitic relationship has led to the bacterium's ability to be carried in the nasopharynx of humans without causing symptoms or infection. This allows it to be passed throughout the human population, increasing its fitness as a species. However, only approximately 50% of the human population are carriers of S. aureus, with 20% as continuous carriers and 30% as intermittent. This leads scientists to believe that many factors determine whether S. aureus is carried asymptomatically in humans, including individual-specific factors. According to a 1995 study by Hofman et al., these factors may include age, sex, diabetes, and smoking. They also noted genetic variations in humans that increase the likelihood of S. aureus colonization, notably a polymorphism in the glucocorticoid receptor gene that results in larger corticosteroid production. In conclusion, there is evidence that any strain of this bacterium can become invasive, as this is highly dependent upon human factors.

Although S. aureus has quick reproductive and micro-evolutionary rates, multiple barriers prevent evolution within the species. One such barrier is AGR, a global accessory gene regulator within the bacteria. This regulator has been linked to the bacteria's virulence level. Loss of function mutations within this gene have been found to increase the fitness of the bacterium containing it. Thus, S. aureus must make a trade-off to increase its success as a species, exchanging reduced virulence for increased drug resistance. Another barrier to evolution is the Sau1 Type I restriction modification (RM) system. This system exists to protect the bacterium from foreign DNA by digesting it. Exchange of DNA between the same lineage is not blocked, since they have the same enzymes, and the RM system does not recognize the new DNA as foreign, but transfer between different lineages is blocked.

== Microbiology ==
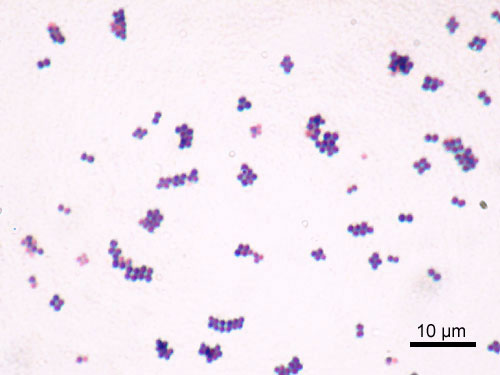
Gram stain of S. aureus cells, which typically occur in clusters: The cell wall readily absorbs the crystal violet stain.

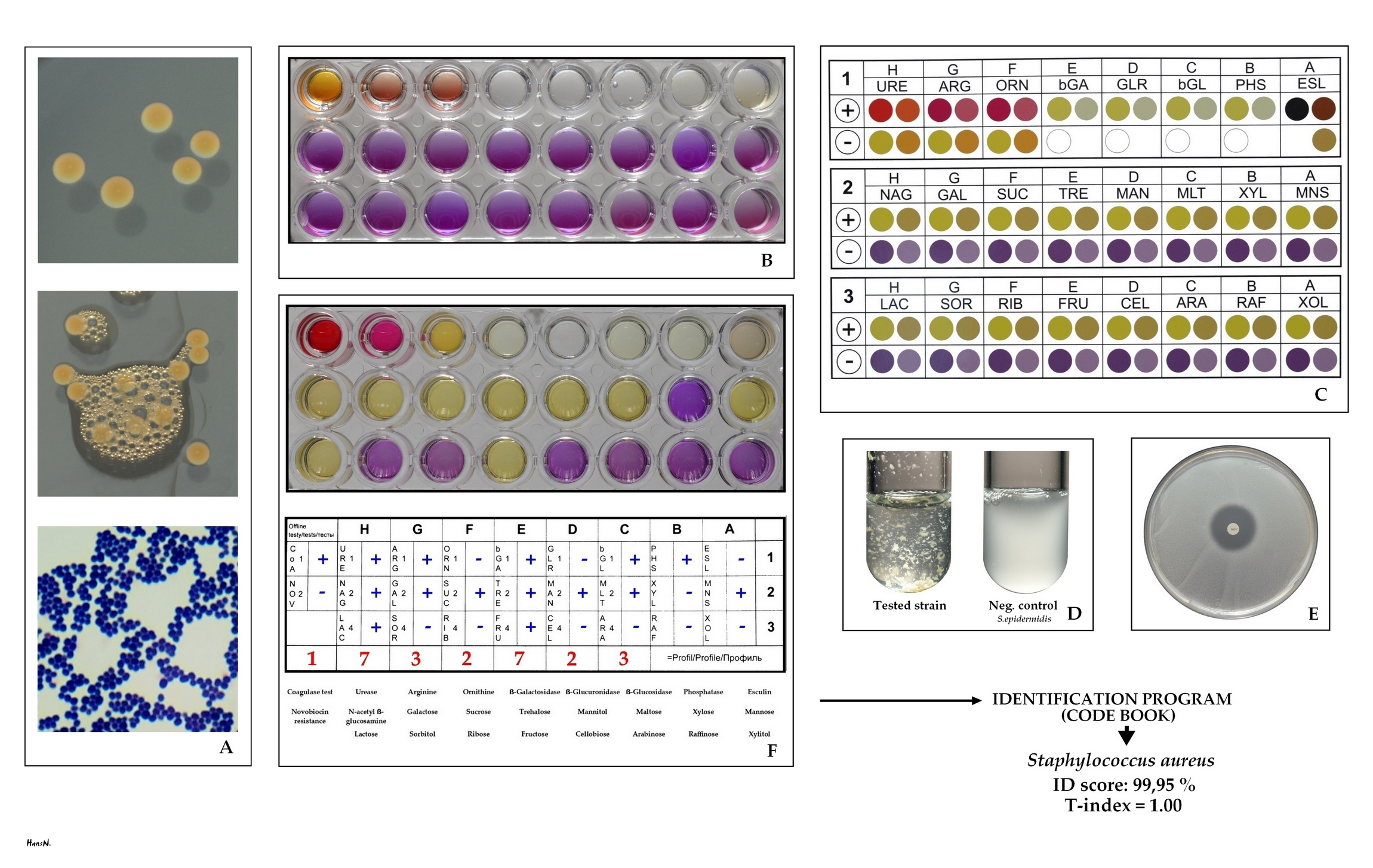
Key characteristics of Staphylococcus aureus

Staphylococcus aureus (/ˌstæfɪləˈkɒkəs ˈɔːriəs, -loʊ-/, Greek σταφυλόκοκκος 'grape-cluster berry', Latin aureus, 'golden') is a facultative anaerobic, gram-positive coccal (round) bacterium also known as "golden staph" and "oro staphira". S. aureus is nonmotile and does not form spores. In medical literature, the bacterium is often referred to as S. aureus, Staph aureus or Staph a.. S. aureus appears as staphylococci (grape-like clusters) when viewed through a microscope, and has large, round, golden-yellow colonies, often with hemolysis, when grown on blood agar plates. S. aureus reproduces asexually by binary fission. Complete separation of the daughter cells is mediated by S. aureus autolysin, and in its absence or targeted inhibition, the daughter cells remain attached and appear as clusters.

Staphylococcus aureus is catalase-positive (meaning it can produce the enzyme catalase). Catalase converts hydrogen peroxide (H_{2}O_{2}) to water and oxygen. Catalase-activity tests are sometimes used to distinguish staphylococci from enterococci and streptococci. Previously, S. aureus was differentiated from other staphylococci by the coagulase test. However, not all S. aureus strains are coagulase-positive and incorrect species identification can impact effective treatment and control measures.

Natural genetic transformation is a reproductive process involving DNA transfer from one bacterium to another through the intervening medium, and the integration of the donor sequence into the recipient genome by homologous recombination. S. aureus was found to be capable of natural genetic transformation, but only at low frequency under the experimental conditions employed. Further studies suggested that the development of competence for natural genetic transformation may be substantially higher under appropriate conditions, yet to be discovered.

== Role in health ==
In humans, S. aureus can be present in the upper respiratory tract, gut mucosa, and skin as a member of the normal microbiota. However, because S. aureus can cause disease under certain host and environmental conditions, it is characterized as a pathobiont.

In the United States, MRSA infections alone are estimated to cost the healthcare system over $3.2 billion annually. These infections account for nearly 20,000 deaths each year in the U.S., exceeding those caused by HIV/AIDS, Parkinson's disease, and homicide. Annually, over 119,000 bloodstream infections in the U.S. are attributed to S. aureus. S. aureus infections are ranked as one of the costliest healthcare-associated infections (HAIs), with each case averaging $23,000 to $46,000 in treatment and hospital resource utilization.

On average, patients with MRSA infections experience a lengthened hospital stay of approximately 6 to 11 days, which drives up inpatient care costs. The burden extends beyond direct healthcare expenses. Indirect costs, such as lost wages, reduced productivity, and long-term disability, can significantly amplify the overall economic toll. Severe S. aureus infections, including bacteremia, endocarditis, and osteomyelitis, often require prolonged recovery and rehabilitation, affecting patients' ability to return to work or perform daily activities.

Hospitals also invest heavily in infection control protocols to limit the spread of S. aureus, especially drug-resistant strains. These measures include routine screening, isolation practices, use of personal protective equipment, and antibiotic stewardship programs, which collectively contribute to rising operational costs. These necessary preventative measures can raise hospital costs by tens of thousands of dollars.

== Role in disease ==
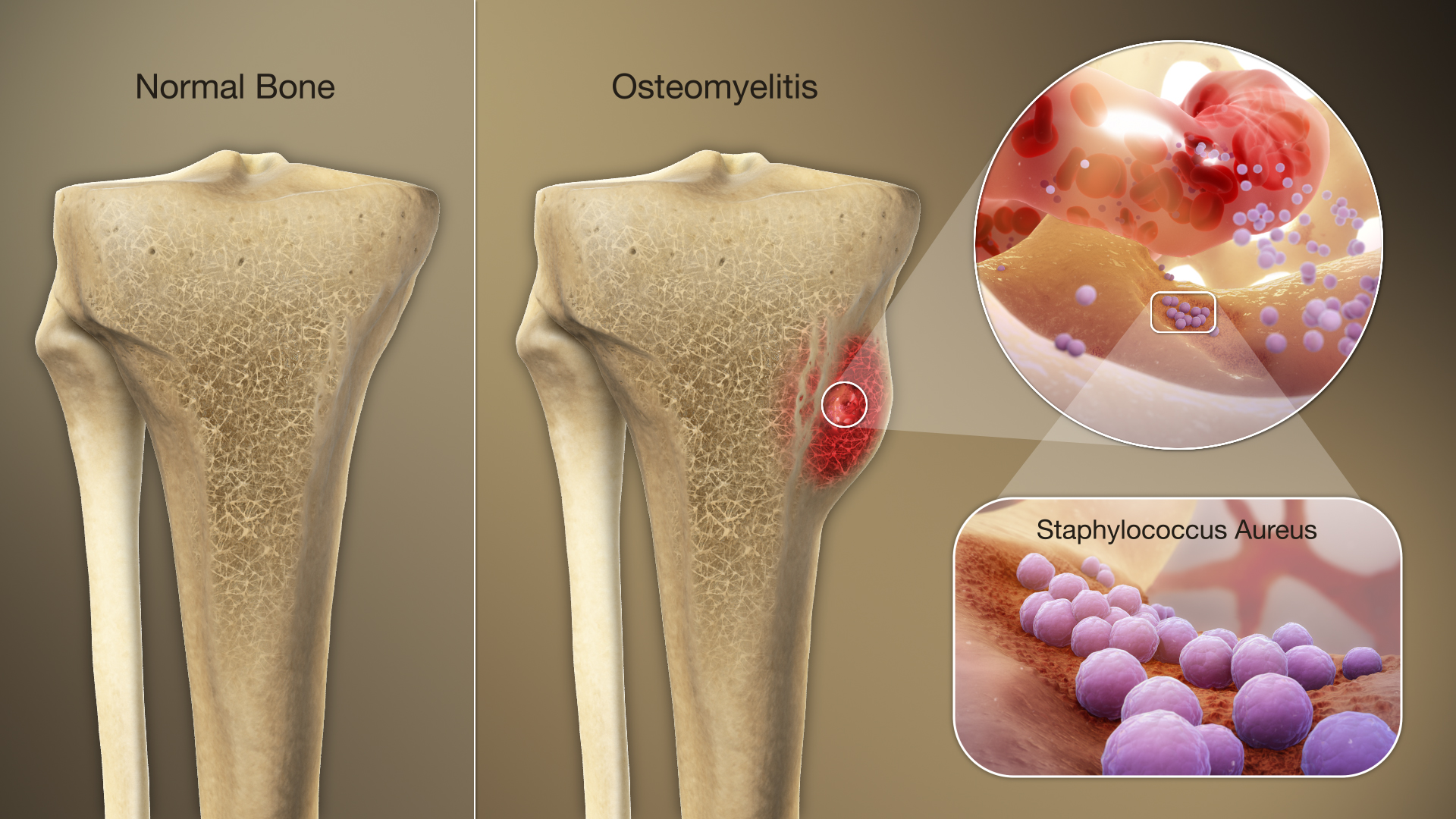
3D medical animation still shot of osteomyelitis bone

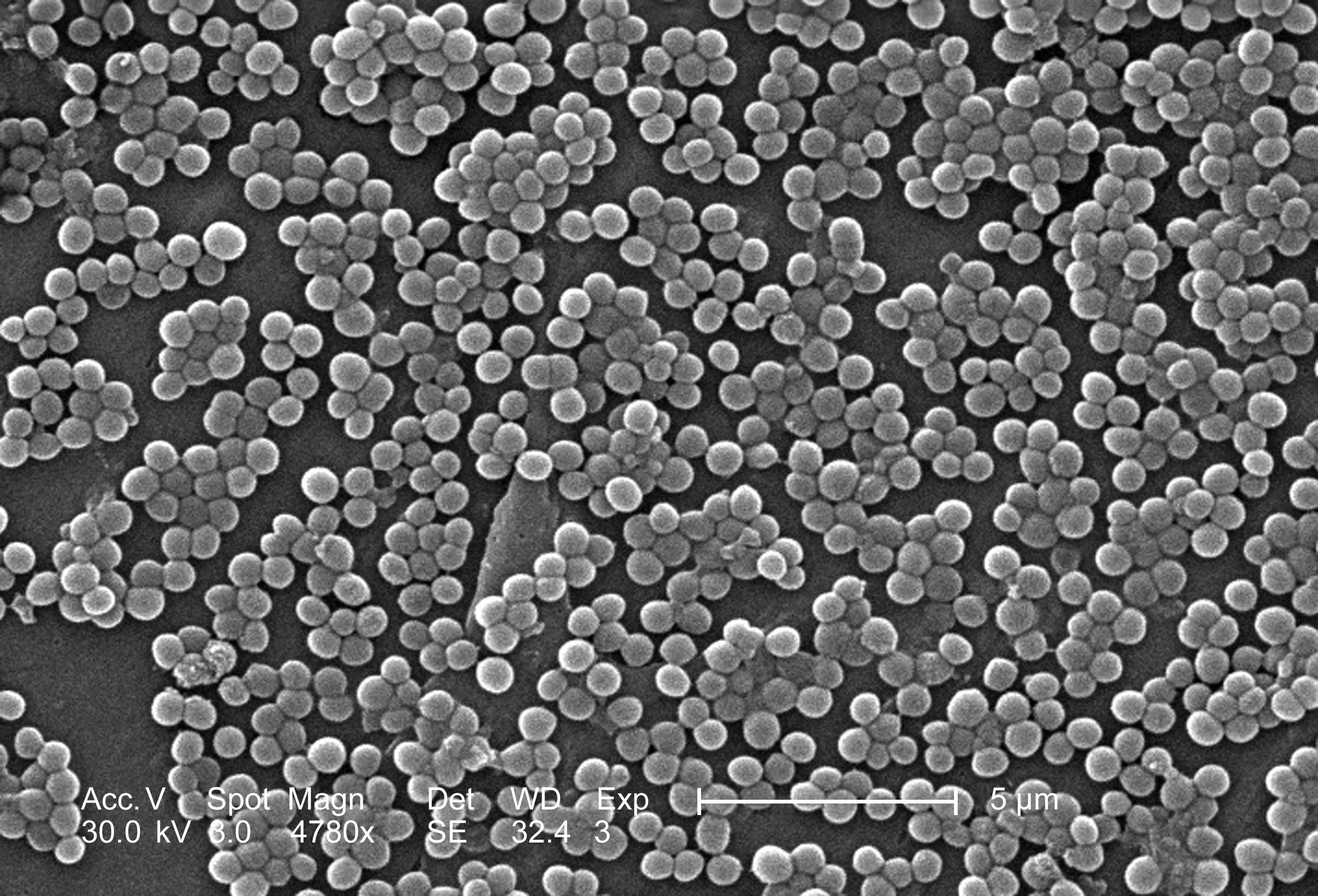
This 2005 scanning electron micrograph (SEM) depicts numerous clumps of methicillin-resistant S. aureus (MRSA) bacteria.

While S. aureus usually acts as a commensal bacterium, asymptomatically colonizing about 30% of the human population, it can sometimes cause disease. In particular, S. aureus is one of the most common causes of bacteremia and infective endocarditis. Additionally, it can cause various skin and soft-tissue infections, particularly when skin or mucosal barriers have been breached.

Staphylococcus aureus infections can spread through contact with pus from an infected wound, skin-to-skin contact with an infected person, and contact with objects used by an infected person, such as towels, sheets, clothing, or athletic equipment. Joint replacements put a person at particular risk of septic arthritis, staphylococcal endocarditis (infection of the heart valves), and pneumonia.

Staphylococcus aureus is a significant cause of chronic biofilm infections on medical implants, and the repressor of toxins is part of the infection pathway.

Staphylococcus aureus can lie dormant in the body for years undetected. Once symptoms begin, the host remains contagious for another two weeks, and the overall illness lasts a few weeks. If untreated, though, the disease can be deadly. Deeply penetrating S. aureus infections can be severe.

=== Skin infections ===
Skin infections are the most common form of S. aureus infection. This can manifest in various ways, including small benign boils, folliculitis, impetigo, cellulitis, and more severe, invasive soft-tissue infections.

Staphylococcus aureus is highly prevalent among persons with atopic dermatitis (AD), more commonly known as eczema. It is mostly found in fertile, active places, including the armpits, hair, and scalp. Large pimples that appear in those areas may exacerbate the infection if lacerated. Colonization of S. aureus drives inflammation of AD. S. aureus is believed to exploit defects in the skin barrier of persons with atopic dermatitis, triggering cytokine expression and therefore exacerbating symptoms. This can lead to staphylococcal scalded skin syndrome, a severe form of which can be seen in newborns.

The role of S. aureus in causing itching in atopic dermatitis has been studied.

Antibiotics are commonly used to target the overgrowth of S. aureus, but their benefits are limited, and they increase the risk of antimicrobial resistance. For these reasons, they are only recommended for people who not only present with skin symptoms but also feel systemically unwell.

=== Food poisoning ===
Staphylococcus aureus is also responsible for food poisoning and achieves this by generating toxins in the food, which is then ingested. Its incubation period lasts 30 minutes to eight hours, with the illness itself lasting from 30 minutes to 3 days. Preventive measures one can take to help prevent the spread of the disease include washing hands thoroughly with soap and water before preparing food. The Centers for Disease Control and Prevention recommends staying away from any food if ill, and wearing gloves if any open wounds occur on hands or wrists while preparing food. If storing food for longer than 2 hours, it is recommended to keep the food below 4.4 or above 60 °C (below 40 or above 140 °F).

=== Bone and joint infections ===
Staphylococcus aureus is a common cause of major bone and joint infections, including osteomyelitis, septic arthritis, and infections following joint replacement surgeries.

=== ENT infections ===
While usually asymptomatic within the nasopharynx, S. aureus can become active and cause chronic inflammation in the ear, nose, and throat area. S. aureus was found by Horiguti (1975) to be the most common pathogen in human nasopharyngeal samples, which also showed signs of inflammation. It is the most common cause of recurrent tonsillitis, which usually requires removal of the adenoid. To defend its residency, it uses biofilms and intracellular persistence. Biofilms are commonly found in adenoid mucosal samples from patients with chronic ear infections, often S. aureus.

=== Bacteremia ===
Staphylococcus aureus is a leading cause of bloodstream infections throughout much of the industrialized world. Infection is generally associated with breaks in the skin or mucosal membranes due to surgery, injury, or use of intravascular devices such as cannulas, hemodialysis machines, or hypodermic needles. Once the bacteria have entered the bloodstream, they can infect various organs, causing infective endocarditis, septic arthritis, and osteomyelitis. This disease is particularly prevalent and severe in the very young and very old.

Without antibiotic treatment, S. aureus bacteremia has a case fatality rate around 80%. With antibiotic treatment, case fatality rates range from 15% to 50% depending on the age and health of the patient, as well as the antibiotic resistance of the S. aureus strain.

=== Medical implant infections ===
Staphylococcus aureus is often found in biofilms formed on medical devices implanted in the body or on human tissue. It is commonly found with another pathogen, Candida albicans, forming multispecies biofilms. The latter is suspected to help S. aureus penetrate human tissue. A higher mortality is linked with multispecies biofilms.

Staphylococcus aureus biofilm is the predominant cause of orthopedic implant-related infections, but is also found on cardiac implants, vascular grafts, various catheters, and cosmetic surgical implants. After implantation, the surface of these devices becomes coated with host proteins, which provide a rich surface for bacterial attachment and biofilm formation. Once the device becomes infected, it must be completely removed, since S. aureus biofilm cannot be destroyed by antibiotic treatments.

Current therapy for S. aureus biofilm-mediated infections involves surgical removal of the infected device followed by antibiotic treatment. Conventional antibiotic treatment alone is not effective in eradicating such infections. An alternative to postsurgical antibiotic treatment is using antibiotic-loaded, dissolvable calcium sulfate beads, which are implanted with the medical device. These beads can release high doses of antibiotics at the desired site to prevent the initial infection.

Novel treatments for S. aureus biofilm involving nano silver particles, bacteriophages, and plant-derived antibiotic agents are being studied. These agents have shown inhibitory effects against S. aureus embedded in biofilms. A class of enzymes has been found to have biofilm matrix-degrading ability, thus may be used as biofilm dispersal agents in combination with antibiotics.

=== Animal infections ===
Staphylococcus aureus can survive on dogs, cats, and horses, and can cause bumblefoot in chickens. Some believe health-care workers' dogs should be considered a significant source of antibiotic-resistant S. aureus, especially in times of outbreak. In a 2008 study by Boost, O'Donoghue, and James, it was found that just about 90% of S. aureus colonized within pet dogs presented as resistant to at least one antibiotic. The nasal region has been implicated as the most important site of transfer between dogs and humans.

Staphylococcus aureus is one of the causal agents of mastitis in dairy cows. Its large polysaccharide capsule protects the organism from recognition by the cow's immune defenses.

== Virulence factors ==
=== Enzymes ===
Staphylococcus aureus produces various enzymes, such as coagulase (bound and free coagulases), which facilitate the conversion of fibrinogen to fibrin to cause clots, which is important in skin infections. Hyaluronidase (also known as spreading factor) breaks down hyaluronic acid and helps in spreading it. Deoxyribonuclease, which breaks down the DNA, protects S. aureus from neutrophil extracellular trap-mediated killing. S. aureus also produces lipase to digest lipids, staphylokinase to dissolve fibrin and aid in spread, and beta-lactamase for drug resistance.

=== Toxins ===
Depending on the strain, S. aureus is capable of secreting several exotoxins, which can be categorized into three groups. Many of these toxins are associated with specific diseases.

Superantigens
Antigens known as superantigens can induce toxic shock syndrome (TSS). This group comprises 25 staphylococcal enterotoxins (SEs) which have been identified to date and named alphabetically (SEA–SEZ), including enterotoxin type B as well as the toxic shock syndrome toxin TSST-1 which causes TSS associated with tampon use. Toxic shock syndrome is characterized by fever, erythematous rash, low blood pressure, shock, multiple organ failure, and skin peeling. The lack of antibody to TSST-1 contributes to the pathogenesis of TSS. Other strains of S. aureus can produce an enterotoxin that is the causative agent of a type of gastroenteritis. This form of gastroenteritis is self-limiting, characterized by vomiting and diarrhea 1–6 hours after ingestion of the toxin, with recovery in 8–24 hours. Signs and symptoms include nausea, vomiting, diarrhea, and major abdominal pain.

Exfoliative toxins

Exfoliative toxins are exotoxins implicated in the disease staphylococcal scalded skin syndrome (SSSS), which occurs most commonly in infants and young children. SSS may occur as epidemics in hospital nurseries. S. aureus produces two exfoliatin toxins: exfoliatin A and B. The protease activity of the exfoliative toxins causes peeling of the skin observed with SSSS.

Other toxins
Staphylococcal toxins that act on cell membranes include alpha toxin, beta toxin, delta toxin, and several bicomponent toxins. Strains of S. aureus can host phages, such as the prophage Φ-PVL that produces Panton-Valentine leukocidin (PVL), to increase virulence. The bicomponent toxin PVL is associated with severe necrotizing pneumonia in children. The genes encoding the components of PVL are encoded on a bacteriophage found in community-associated MRSA strains.

=== Type VII secretion system ===
A secretion system is a highly specialised multi-protein unit embedded in the cell envelope that translocates effector proteins from inside the cell to the extracellular space or into a target host cytosol. The exact structure and function of T7SS is yet to be fully elucidated. Currently, four proteins are known components of S. aureus type VII secretion system; EssC is a large integral membrane ATPase, which most likely powers the secretion systems, and has been hypothesised to form part of the translocation channel. The other proteins are EsaA, EssB, and EssC, which are membrane proteins that function alongside EssC to mediate protein secretion. The exact mechanism of how substrates reach the cell surface is unknown, as is the interaction of the three membrane proteins with each other and EssC.

T7 dependent effector proteins

EsaD is DNA endonuclease toxin secreted by S. aureus, has been shown to inhibit growth of competitor S. aureus strain in vitro. EsaD is cosecreted with chaperone EsaE, which stabilises EsaD structure and brings EsaD to EssC for secretion. Strains that produce EsaD also co-produce EsaG, a cytoplasmic anti-toxin that protects the producer strain from EsaD's toxicity.

TspA is another toxin that mediates intraspecies competition. It is a bacteriostatic toxin with membrane depolarising activity facilitated by its C-terminal domain. Tsai is a transmembrane protein that confers immunity to the producer strain of TspA, as well as the attacked strains. There is genetic variability in the C-terminal domain of TspA; therefore, the strains may produce different TspA variants to increase competitiveness.

Toxins that play a role in intraspecies competition confer an advantage by promoting successful colonisation in polymicrobial communities such as the nasopharynx and lung by outcompeting weaker strains.

There are also T7 effector proteins that play role a in pathogenesis, for example mutational studies of S. aureus have suggested that EsxB and EsxC contribute to persistent infection in a murine abscess model.

EsxX has been implicated in neutrophil lysis; therefore, it has been suggested as a contributor to the evasion of the host immune system. Deletion of essX in S. aureus resulted in significantly reduced resistance to neutrophils and reduced virulence in murine skin and blood infection models.

Altogether, T7SS and known secreted effector proteins are a strategy of pathogenesis by improving fitness against competitor S. aureus species as well as increased virulence via evading the innate immune system and optimising persistent infections.

=== Small RNA ===
The list of small RNAs involved in the control of bacterial virulence in S. aureus is growing. This can be facilitated by factors such as increased biofilm formation in the presence of increased levels of such small RNAs. For example, RNAIII, SprD, SprC, RsaE, SprA1, SSR42, ArtR, SprX, Teg49, and IsrR.

=== DNA repair ===
Host neutrophils cause DNA double-strand breaks in S. aureus through the production of reactive oxygen species. For infection of a host to be successful, S. aureus must survive such damages caused by the host's defenses. The two protein complex RexAB encoded by S. aureus is employed in the recombinational repair of DNA double-strand breaks.

=== Strategies for post-transcriptional regulation by 3'untranslated region ===
Many mRNAs in S. aureus carry three prime untranslated regions (3'UTR) longer than 100 nucleotides, which may potentially have a regulatory function.

Further investigation of icaR mRNA (mRNA coding for the repressor of the main expolysaccharidic compound of the bacteria biofilm matrix) demonstrated that the 3'UTR binding to the 5' UTR can interfere with the translation initiation complex and generate a double-stranded substrate for RNase III. The interaction is between the UCCCCUG motif in the 3'UTR and the Shine-Dalagarno region at the 5'UTR. Deletion of the motif resulted in IcaR repressor accumulation and inhibition of biofilm development. The biofilm formation is the main cause of Staphylococcus implant infections.

=== Biofilm ===
Biofilms are groups of microorganisms, such as bacteria, that attach to each other and grow on wet surfaces. The S. aureus biofilm is embedded in a glycocalyx slime layer and can consist of teichoic acids, host proteins, extracellular DNA (eDNA), and sometimes polysaccharide intercellular antigen (PIA). S. aureus biofilms are important in disease pathogenesis, as they can contribute to antibiotic resistance and immune system evasion. S. aureus biofilm has high resistance to antibiotic treatments and host immune response. One hypothesis for explaining this is that the biofilm matrix protects the embedded cells by acting as a barrier to prevent antibiotic penetration. However, the biofilm matrix is composed of many water channels, so this hypothesis is becoming increasingly less likely, but a biofilm matrix possibly contains antibiotic‐degrading enzymes such as β-lactamases, which can prevent antibiotic penetration. Another hypothesis is that the conditions in the biofilm matrix favor the formation of persister cells, which are highly antibiotic-resistant, dormant bacterial cells. S. aureus biofilms also have high resistance to host immune response. Though the exact mechanism of resistance is unknown, S. aureus biofilms have increased growth in the presence of cytokines produced by the host immune response. Host antibodies are less effective for S. aureus biofilm due to the heterogeneous antigen distribution, where an antigen may be present in some areas of the biofilm, but completely absent from other areas.

Studies in biofilm development have shown changes in gene expression. Specific genes were found to be crucial in the different biofilm growth stages. Two of these genes include rocD and gudB, which encode for the enzymes ornithine-oxo-acid transaminase and glutamate dehydrogenase, which are important for amino acid metabolism. Studies have shown biofilm development relies on amino acids glutamine and glutamate for proper metabolic functions.

=== Other immunoevasive strategies ===
Protein A

Protein A is anchored to staphylococcal peptidoglycan pentaglycine bridges (chains of five glycine residues) by the transpeptidase sortase A. Protein A, an IgG-binding protein, binds to the Fc region of an antibody. In fact, studies involving mutation of genes coding for protein A resulted in a lowered virulence of S. aureus as measured by survival in blood, which has led to speculation that protein A-contributed virulence requires binding of antibody Fc regions.

Protein A in various recombinant forms has been used for decades to bind and purify a wide range of antibodies by immunoaffinity chromatography. Transpeptidases, such as the sortases responsible for anchoring factors like protein A to the staphylococcal peptidoglycan, are being studied in hopes of developing new antibiotics to target MRSA infections.

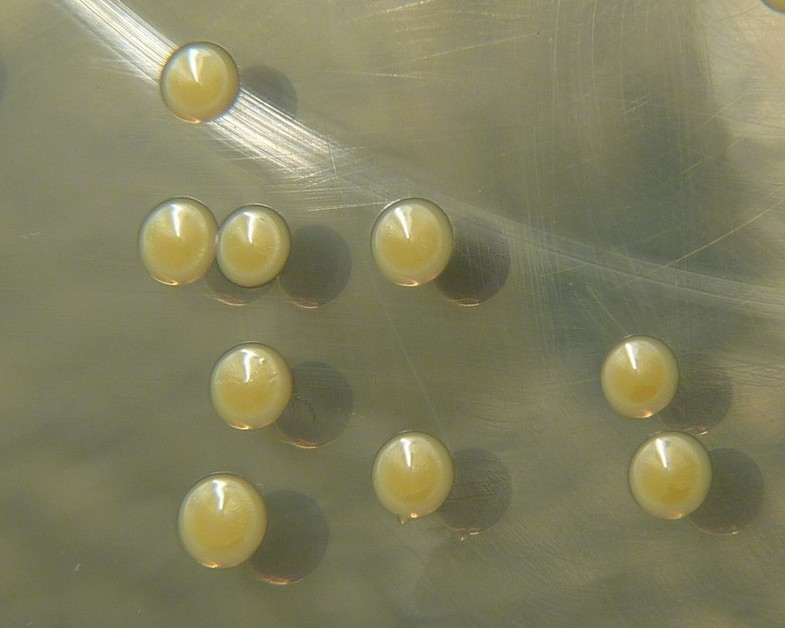
S. aureus on trypticase soy agar: The strain is producing a yellow pigment staphyloxanthin.

Staphylococcal pigments

Some strains of S. aureus are capable of producing staphyloxanthin – a golden-coloured carotenoid pigment. This pigment acts as a virulence factor, primarily by being a bacterial antioxidant which helps the microbe evade the reactive oxygen species which the host immune system uses to kill pathogens.

Mutant strains of S. aureus modified to lack staphyloxanthin are less likely to survive incubation with an oxidizing chemical, such as hydrogen peroxide, than pigmented strains. Mutant colonies are quickly killed when exposed to human neutrophils, while many of the pigmented colonies survive. In mice, the pigmented strains cause lingering abscesses when inoculated into wounds, whereas wounds infected with the unpigmented strains quickly heal.

These tests suggest the Staphylococcus strains use staphyloxanthin as a defence against the normal human immune system. Drugs designed to inhibit the production of staphyloxanthin may weaken the bacterium and renew its susceptibility to antibiotics. In fact, because of similarities in the pathways for biosynthesis of staphyloxanthin and human cholesterol, a drug developed in the context of cholesterol-lowering therapy was shown to block S. aureus pigmentation and disease progression in a mouse infection model.

Resistance to Hypothiocyanous Acid (HOSCN)

Staphylococcus aureus has developed an adaptive mechanism to tolerate hypothiocyanous acid (HOSCN), a potent oxidant produced by the human immune system. Compared to other methicillin-resistant S. aureus (MRSA) strains and bacterial pathogens such as Pseudomonas aeruginosa, Escherichia coli, and Streptococcus pneumoniae, S. aureus exhibits greater resistance to HOSCN.

This resistance is linked to the merA gene, which encodes a flavoprotein disulfide reductase (FDR) enzyme. S. aureus MerA shares similarities with HOSCN reductases from other bacteria, including S. pneumoniae (50% sequence identity, 66% positives) and RclA in E. coli (50% sequence identity, 65% positives). These enzymes play a crucial role in oxidative stress defense by using NADPH as a cofactor to reduce disulfide bonds, thereby mitigating the oxidative damage caused by HOSCN. This mechanism enhances S. aureus survival within the host by counteracting the immune system's oxidative attack.

Functional characterization of MerA has revealed that the amino acid residue Cys43 (C43) is essential for its enzymatic activity against HOSCN. Additionally, the expression of merA in S. aureus is regulated by the hypR gene, a transcriptional suppressor that modulates the bacterial response to oxidative stress.

== Classical diagnosis ==
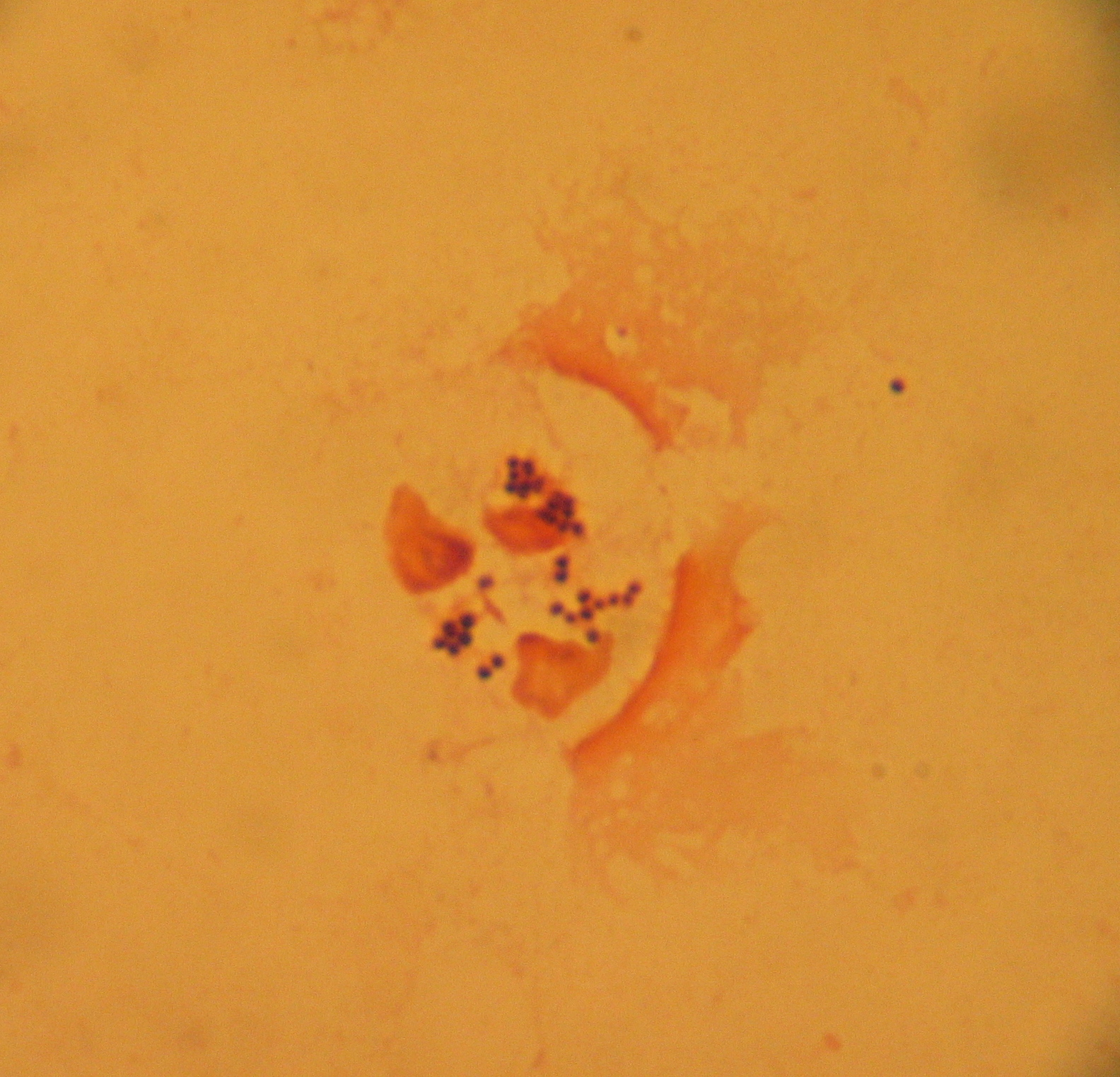
Typical gram-positive cocci, in clusters, from a sputum sample, Gram stain

Depending on the type of infection, an appropriate specimen is obtained and sent to the laboratory for definitive identification by using biochemical or enzyme-based tests. A Gram stain is first performed to guide the way, which should show typical Gram-positive bacteria, cocci, in clusters. Second, the isolate is cultured on mannitol salt agar, which is a selective medium with 7.5% NaCl that allows S. aureus to grow, producing yellow-colored colonies as a result of mannitol fermentation and subsequent drop in the medium's pH.

Furthermore, for differentiation on the species level, catalase (positive for all Staphylococcus species), coagulase (fibrin clot formation, positive for S. aureus), DNAse (zone of clearance on DNase agar), lipase (a yellow color and rancid odor smell), and phosphatase (a pink color) tests are all done. For staphylococcal food poisoning, phage typing can be performed to determine whether the staphylococci recovered from the food were the source of infection.

=== Rapid diagnosis and typing ===
Diagnostic microbiology laboratories and reference laboratories are key for identifying outbreaks and new strains of S. aureus. Recent genetic advances have enabled reliable and rapid techniques for the identification and characterization of clinical isolates of S. aureus in real time. These tools support infection control strategies to limit bacterial spread and ensure appropriate antibiotic use. Quantitative PCR is increasingly being used to identify outbreaks of infection.

When observing the evolution of S. aureus and its ability to adapt to each modified antibiotic, two basic methods known as "band-based" or "sequence-based" are employed. Keeping these two methods in mind, other methods such as multilocus sequence typing (MLST), pulsed-field gel electrophoresis (PFGE), bacteriophage typing, spa locus typing, and SCCmec typing are often conducted more than others. With these methods, it can be determined where strains of MRSA originated and also where they are currently.

With MLST, this typing technique uses fragments of several housekeeping genes, known as aroE, glpF, gmk, pta, tip, and yqiL. These sequences are then assigned a number, which gives a string of several numbers that serve as the allelic profile. Although this is a common method, a limitation is the maintenance of the microarray, which detects new allelic profiles, making it a costly and time-consuming experiment.

With PFGE, a method which is still very much used, dating back to its first success in the 1980s, remains capable of helping differentiate MRSA isolates. To accomplish this, the technique uses multiple gel electrophoresis, along with a voltage gradient to display clear resolutions of molecules. The S. aureus fragments then transition down the gel, producing specific band patterns that are later compared with other isolates in hopes of identifying related strains. Limitations of the method include practical difficulties with uniform band patterns and overall PFGE sensitivity.

Spa locus typing is also a popular technique that uses a single-locus zone in a polymorphic region of S. aureus to distinguish mutations. Although this technique is often inexpensive and less time-consuming, the chance of losing discriminatory power, making it hard to differentiate between MLST clonal complexes, exemplifies a crucial limitation.

== Treatment ==
For susceptible strains, the treatment of choice for S. aureus infection is penicillin. An antibiotic derived from some Penicillium fungal species, penicillin inhibits the formation of peptidoglycan cross-linkages that provide the rigidity and strength in a bacterial cell wall. The four-membered β-lactam ring of penicillin is bound to the enzyme DD-transpeptidase, an enzyme that, when functional, cross-links chains of peptidoglycan that form bacterial cell walls. The binding of β-lactam to DD-transpeptidase inhibits the enzyme's functionality, and it can no longer catalyze the formation of the cross-links. As a result, cell wall formation and degradation are imbalanced, thus resulting in cell death. In most countries, however, penicillin resistance is extremely common (>90%). First-line therapy is most commonly a penicillinase-resistant β-lactam antibiotic (for example, oxacillin or flucloxacillin, both of which have the same mechanism of action as penicillin) or vancomycin, depending on local resistance patterns. Combination therapy with gentamicin may be used to treat serious infections, such as endocarditis, but its use is controversial because of the high risk of damage to the kidneys. The duration of treatment depends on the site of infection and on severity. Adjunctive rifampicin has historically been used in the management of S aureus bacteraemia, but randomised controlled trial evidence has shown no overall benefit over standard antibiotic therapy.

Antibiotic resistance in S. aureus was uncommon when penicillin was first introduced in 1943. Indeed, the original Petri dish on which Alexander Fleming of Imperial College London observed the antibacterial activity of the Penicillium fungus was growing a culture of S. aureus. By 1950, 40% of hospital S. aureus isolates were penicillin-resistant; by 1960, this had risen to 80%.

Methicillin-resistant Staphylococcus aureus (MRSA, often pronounced /ˈmɜːrsə/ or /ɛm ɑːr ɛs eɪ/), is one of a number of greatly feared strains of S. aureus which have become resistant to most β-lactam antibiotics. For this reason, vancomycin, a glycopeptide antibiotic, is commonly used to combat MRSA. Vancomycin inhibits the synthesis of peptidoglycan, but unlike β-lactam antibiotics, glycopeptide antibiotics target and bind to amino acids in the cell wall, preventing peptidoglycan cross-linkages from forming. MRSA strains are most often found associated with institutions such as hospitals, but are becoming increasingly prevalent in community-acquired infections.

Minor skin infections can be treated with triple antibiotic ointment. One topical agent that is prescribed is mupirocin, a protein synthesis inhibitor that is produced naturally by Pseudomonas fluorescens and has seen success for treatment of S. aureus nasal carriage.

=== Antibiotic resistance ===
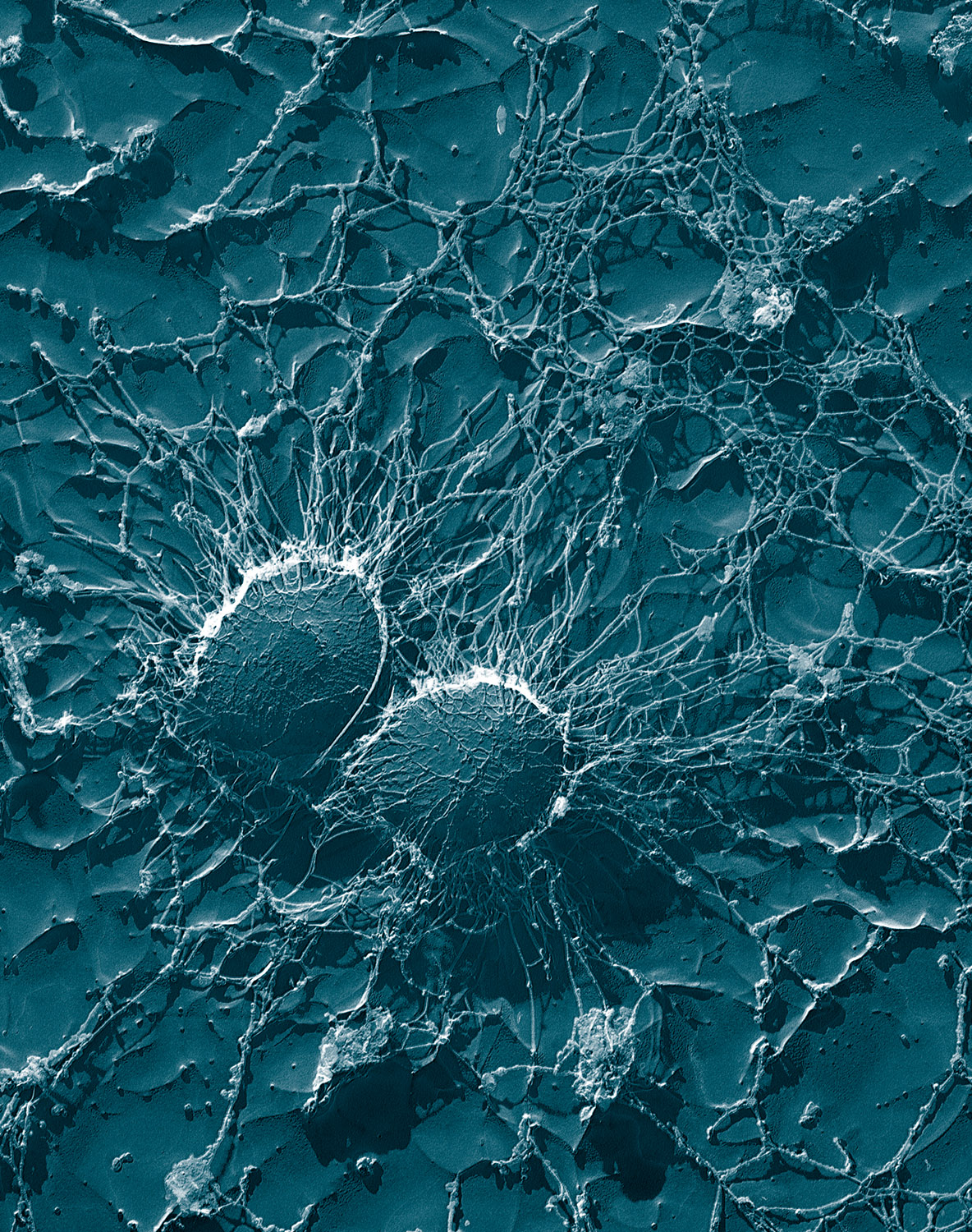
Bacterial cells of S. aureus, which is one of the causal agents of mastitis in dairy cows: Its large capsule protects the organism from attack by the cow's immunological defenses.

Staphylococcus aureus was the second-leading pathogen for deaths associated with antimicrobial resistance in 2019.

Staphylococcal resistance to penicillin is mediated by penicillinase (a form of beta-lactamase) production: an enzyme that cleaves the β-lactam ring of the penicillin molecule, rendering the antibiotic ineffective. Penicillinase-resistant β-lactam antibiotics, such as methicillin, nafcillin, oxacillin, cloxacillin, dicloxacillin, and flucloxacillin are able to resist degradation by staphylococcal penicillinase.

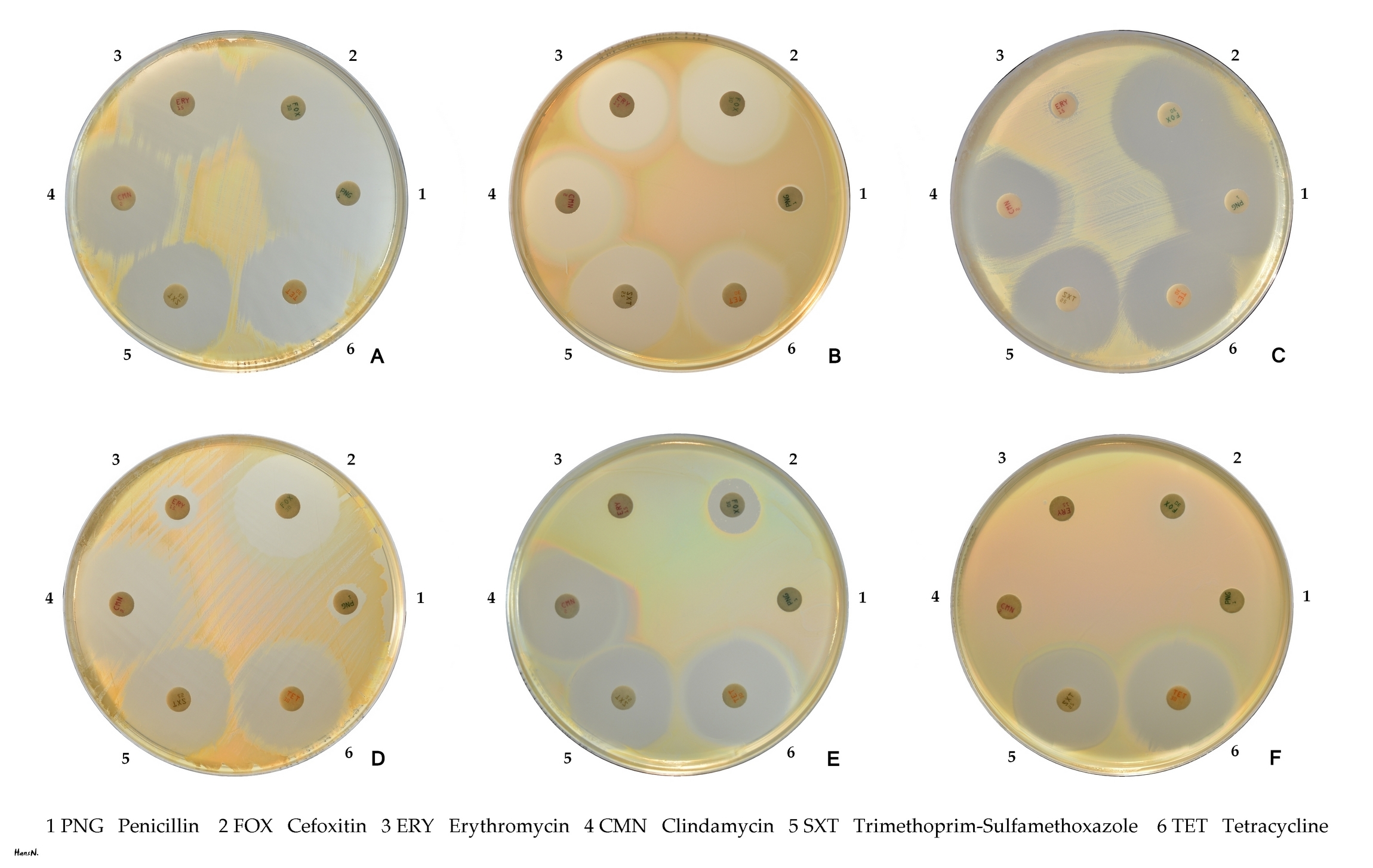
Susceptibility to commonly used antibiotics.

Methicillin resistance is mediated via the mec operon, part of the staphylococcal cassette chromosome mec (SCCmec). SCCmec is a family of mobile genetic elements, which is a major driving force in S. aureus evolution. Resistance is conferred by the mecA gene, which codes for an altered penicillin-binding protein (PBP2a or PBP2') that has a lower affinity for binding β-lactams (penicillins, cephalosporins, and carbapenems). This confers resistance to all β-lactam antibiotics and obviates their clinical use during MRSA infections. Studies have shown that this mobile genetic element has been acquired by different lineages in separate gene transfer events, indicating that there is no common ancestor of differing MRSA strains. One study suggests that MRSA sacrifices virulence, for example, toxin production and invasiveness, for survival and creation of biofilms

Aminoglycoside antibiotics, such as kanamycin, gentamicin, streptomycin, were once effective against staphylococcal infections until strains evolved mechanisms to inhibit the aminoglycosides' action, which occurs via protonated amine and/or hydroxyl interactions with the ribosomal RNA of the bacterial 30S ribosomal subunit. Three main mechanisms of aminoglycoside resistance mechanisms are currently and widely accepted: aminoglycoside modifying enzymes, ribosomal mutations, and active efflux of the drug out of the bacteria.

Aminoglycoside-modifying enzymes inactivate the aminoglycoside by covalently attaching either a phosphate, nucleotide, or acetyl moiety to either the amine or the alcohol key functional group (or both groups) of the antibiotic. This changes the charge or sterically hinders the antibiotic, decreasing its ribosomal binding affinity. In S. aureus, the best-characterized aminoglycoside-modifying enzyme is aminoglycoside adenylyltransferase 4' IA (ANT(4')IA). This enzyme has been solved by X-ray crystallography. The enzyme can attach an adenyl moiety to the 4' hydroxyl group of many aminoglycosides, including kanamycin and gentamicin.

Glycopeptide resistance is typically mediated by acquisition of the vanA gene, which originates from the Tn1546 transposon found in a plasmid in enterococci and codes for an enzyme that produces an alternative peptidoglycan to which vancomycin will not bind.

Today, S. aureus has become resistant to many commonly used antibiotics. In the UK, only 2% of all S. aureus isolates are penicillin-sensitive, with a similar picture worldwide. The β-lactamase-resistant penicillins (methicillin, oxacillin, cloxacillin, and flucloxacillin) were developed to treat penicillin-resistant S. aureus, and are still used as first-line treatment. Methicillin was the first antibiotic in this class to be used (it was introduced in 1959), but only two years later, the first case of methicillin-resistant Staphylococcus aureus (MRSA) was reported in England.

Despite this, MRSA generally remained an uncommon finding, even in hospital settings, until the 1990s, when the MRSA prevalence in hospitals exploded, and it is now endemic. Now, methicillin-resistant Staphylococcus aureus (MRSA) is not only a human pathogen causing a variety of infections, such as skin and soft tissue infection (SSTI), pneumonia, and sepsis, but it also can cause disease in animals, known as livestock-associated MRSA (LA-MRSA).

MRSA infections in both hospital and community settings are commonly treated with non-β-lactam antibiotics, such as clindamycin (a lincosamine) and co-trimoxazole (also commonly known as trimethoprim/sulfamethoxazole). Resistance to these antibiotics has also led to the use of new, broad-spectrum anti-Gram-positive antibiotics, such as linezolid, because of its availability as an oral drug. First-line treatment for serious invasive infections due to MRSA is currently glycopeptide antibiotics (vancomycin and teicoplanin). Several problems with these antibiotics occur, such as the need for intravenous administration (no oral preparation is available), toxicity, and the need to monitor drug levels regularly by blood tests. Also, glycopeptide antibiotics do not penetrate very well into infected tissues (this is a particular concern with infections of the brain and meninges and in endocarditis). Glycopeptides must not be used to treat methicillin-sensitive S. aureus (MSSA), as outcomes are inferior.

Daptomycin is a cyclic lipopeptide antibiotic primarily used for treating Gram-positive bacterial infections, including those caused by Staphylococcus aureus. It was first approved in 2003 and is especially effective against resistant strains like methicillin-resistant Staphylococcus aureus (MRSA) and vancomycin-resistant Staphylococcus aureus (VRSA). Daptomycin has a unique mechanism of action compared to other antibiotics. It aggregates in the membrane, forming an open ion channel, causing depolarization and bacterial cell death. Daptomycin is FDA-approved for treating complicated skin and soft tissue infections, bloodstream infections, and right-sided infective endocarditis caused by S. aureus.

Serum triggers a high degree of tolerance to the lipopeptide antibiotic daptomycin and several other classes of antibiotics. Serum-induced daptomycin tolerance is due to two independent mechanisms. The first one is the activation of the GraRS two-component system. The activation is triggered by the host defense LL-37. So that, bacteria can make more peptidoglycan to make the cell wall become thicker. This can make the tolerance of bacteria. The second one is the increase in cardiolipin abundance in the membrane. The serum-adapted bacteria can change their membrane composition. This change can reduce the binding of daptomycin to the bacteria's membrane.

Because of the high level of resistance to penicillins and because of the potential for MRSA to develop resistance to vancomycin, the U.S. Centers for Disease Control and Prevention has published guidelines for the appropriate use of vancomycin. In situations where the incidence of MRSA infections is known to be high, the attending physician may choose to use a glycopeptide antibiotic until the identity of the infecting organism is known. After the infection is confirmed to be due to a methicillin-susceptible strain of S. aureus, treatment can be changed to flucloxacillin or even penicillin, as appropriate.

Vancomycin-resistant S. aureus (VRSA) is a strain of S. aureus that has become resistant to the glycopeptides. The first case of vancomycin-intermediate S. aureus (VISA) was reported in Japan in 1996; but the first case of S. aureus truly resistant to glycopeptide antibiotics was only reported in 2002. Three cases of VRSA infection had been reported in the United States as of 2005. At least in part the antimicrobial resistance in S. aureus can be explained by its ability to adapt. Multiple two-component signal transduction pathways help S. aureus express genes required to survive under antimicrobial stress.

==== Efflux pumps ====
Among the various mechanisms that MRSA acquires to elude antibiotic resistance (e.g., drug inactivation, target alteration, reduction of permeability), there is also the overexpression of efflux pumps. Efflux pumps are membrane-integrated proteins that are physiologically needed in the cell for the exportation of xenobiotic compounds. They are divided into six families, each of which has a different structure, function, and transport of energy. The main efflux pumps of S. aureus are the MFS (Major Facilitator Superfamily), which includes the MdeA pump as well as the NorA pump and the MATE (Multidrug and Toxin Extrusion), to which it belongs the MepA pump. For transport, these families use an electrochemical potential and an ion concentration gradient, while the ATP-binding cassette (ABC) family acquires its energy from the hydrolysis of ATP.

These pumps are overexpressed by MDR S. aureus (Multidrug resistant S. aureus), and the result is an excessive expulsion of the antibiotic outside the cell, which makes its action ineffective. Efflux pumps also contribute significantly to the development of impenetrable biofilms.

By directly modulating efflux pumps' activity or decreasing their expression, it may be possible to modify the resistant phenotype and restore the effectiveness of existing antibiotics.

== Carriage ==
About 33% of the U.S. population are carriers of S. aureus and about 2% carry MRSA. Healthcare providers can also be colonized by MRSA.

The carriage of S. aureus is an important source of hospital-acquired infection (also called nosocomial) and community-acquired MRSA. Although S. aureus can be present on the skin of the host, a large proportion of its carriage is through the anterior nares of the nasal passages and can further be present in the ears. The ability of the nasal passages to harbour S. aureus results from a combination of a weakened or defective host immunity and the bacterium's ability to evade host innate immunity. Nasal carriage is also implicated in the occurrence of staph infections.

== Infection control ==
Environmental contamination is thought to play a relatively less important part compared to direct transmission. Emphasis on basic hand washing techniques are, therefore, effective in preventing its transmission. The use of disposable aprons and gloves by staff reduces skin-to-skin contact, so further reduces the risk of transmission.

Recently, myriad cases of S. aureus have been reported in hospitals across America. Transmission of the pathogen is facilitated in medical settings where healthcare worker hygiene is insufficient. S. aureus is an incredibly hardy bacterium, as was shown in a study where it survived on polyester for just under three months; polyester is the main material used in hospital privacy curtains.

An important and previously unrecognized means of community-associated MRSA colonization and transmission is during sexual contact.

Staphylococcus aureus is killed in one minute at 78 °C and in ten minutes at 64 °C but is resistant to freezing.

Certain strains of S. aureus have been described as being resistant to chlorine disinfection.

The use of mupirocin ointment can reduce the rate of infections due to nasal carriage of S. aureus. There is limited evidence that nasal decontamination of S. aureus using antibiotics or antiseptics can reduce the rates of surgical site infections.

Most common bacterium in each industry
Catering industry	Vibrio parahaemolyticus, S. aureus, Salmonella
Medical industry	Escherichia coli, S. aureus, Pseudomonas aeruginosa

== Research ==
As of 2024, no approved vaccine exists against S. aureus. Early clinical trials have been conducted for several vaccine candidates such as Nabi's StaphVax and PentaStaph, Intercell's / Merck's V710, VRi's SA75, and others.

While some of these vaccine candidates have shown immune responses, others aggravated an infection by S. aureus. To date, none of these candidates protects against an S. aureus infection. The development of Nabi's StaphVax was stopped in 2005 after phase III trials failed. Intercell's first V710 vaccine variant was terminated during phase II/III after higher mortality and morbidity were observed among patients who developed S. aureus infection.

Nabi's enhanced S. aureus vaccine candidate PentaStaph was sold in 2011 to GlaxoSmithKline Biologicals S.A. The current status of PentaStaph is unclear. A WHO document indicates that PentaStaph failed in the phase III trial stage.

In 2010, GlaxoSmithKline started a phase 1 blind study to evaluate its GSK2392103A vaccine. As of 2016, this vaccine is no longer under active development.

Pfizer's S. aureus four-antigen vaccine SA4Ag was granted fast track designation by the U.S. Food and Drug Administration in February 2014. In 2015, Pfizer has commenced a phase 2b trial regarding the SA4Ag vaccine. Phase 1 results published in February 2017 showed a very robust and secure immunogenicity of SA4Ag. The vaccine underwent clinical trial until June 2019, with results published in September 2020, that did not demonstrate a significant reduction in Postoperative Bloodstream Infection after Surgery.

In 2015, Novartis Vaccines and Diagnostics, a former division of Novartis and now part of GlaxoSmithKline, published promising pre-clinical results of their four-component Staphylococcus aureus vaccine, 4C-staph.

In addition to vaccine development, research is being performed to develop alternative treatment options that are effective against antibiotic resistant strains including MRSA. Examples of alternative treatments are phage therapy, antimicrobial peptides and host-directed therapy.

=== Standard strains ===
A number of standard strains of S. aureus (called "type cultures") are used in research and in laboratory testing, such as:

Standard strains of Staphylococcus aureus
Name	NCTC	ATCC	Year of deposit	Comment
Oxford H	6571	9144	1943	Standard strain used for testing penicillin potency and by which the penicillin unit was originally defined.
Rosenbach	12973	29213	1884	Standard strain for EUCAST antimicrobial resistance testing.

== See also ==
- Bundaberg tragedy, deaths of 12 children inoculated with an S. aureus-contaminated vaccine
