= SprX small RNA =

SprX sRNA
- Predicted secondary structure and sequence conservation of SprX small RNA

Identifiers
- Rfam: RF02672

Other data
- Domain(s): Bacteria
- GO: GO:0040033
- SO: SO:0000370
- PDB structures: PDBe

In molecular biology the small pathogenicity island RNA X (alias RsaOR) gene is a bacterial non-coding RNA. It was discovered in a large-scale analysis of Staphylococcus aureus. SprX was shown to influence antibiotic resistance of the bacteria to Vancomycin and Teicoplanin glycopeptides, which are used to treat MRSA infections. In this study the authors identified a SprX target, stage V sporulation protein G (Spo VG). By reducing Spo VG expression levels, SprX affects S. aureus resistance to the glycopeptide antibiotics. Further work demonstrated its involvement in the regulation of pathogenicity factors.

== See also ==
- SprD
