= Teg49 small RNA =

Non-coding RNA

Teg49 sRNA
- Predicted secondary structure and sequence conservation of Teg49 small RNA

Identifiers
- Rfam: RF02696

Other data
- Domain(s): Bacteria
- GO: GO:0009405
- SO: SO:0000370
- PDB structures: PDBe

Teg49 is a non-coding RNA present in the extended promoter region of the staphylococcal accessory regulator sarA. It was identified by RNA-seq and confirmed by Northern blot. It is modulated by sigB (sarA regulator) and cshA (an ATP-dependant DEAD box RNA helicase) and it most likely contributes to virulence of S. aureus by modulating SarA expression.
