= Diapolycopene oxygenase =

Identifiers
- EC no.: 1.14.99.44

Databases
- IntEnz: IntEnz view
- BRENDA: BRENDA entry
- ExPASy: NiceZyme view
- KEGG: KEGG entry
- MetaCyc: metabolic pathway
- PRIAM: profile
- PDB structures: RCSB PDB PDBe PDBsum
Search
- PMC: articles
- PubMed: articles
- NCBI: proteins

Diapolycopene oxygenase (EC 1.14.99.44, crtP) is an enzyme with systematic name 4,4'-diapolycopene,AH2:oxygen oxidoreductase (4,4'-hydroxylating). This enzyme catalyses the following chemical reaction

4,4'-diapolycopene + 4 AH_{2} + 4 O_{2} $\rightleftharpoons$ 4,4'-diapolycopenedial + 4 A + 6 H_{2}O

Diapolycopene oxygenase is involved in the biosynthesis of C30 carotenoids such as staphyloxanthin.
