= Mannitol salt agar =

Culture medium used in microbiology

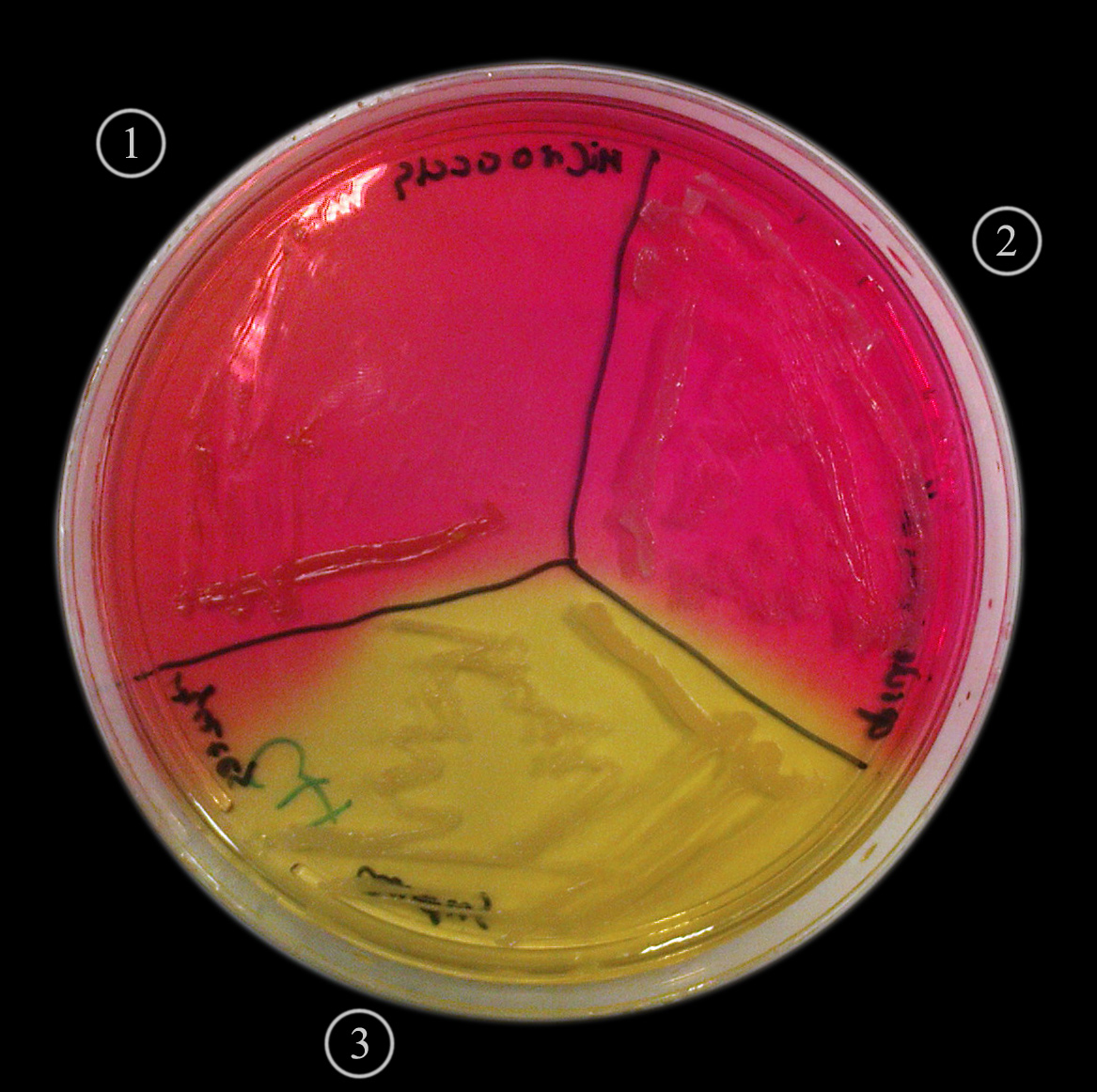
An MSA plate with Micrococcus sp. (1), Staphylococcus epidermidis (2) and S. aureus colonies (3).

Mannitol salt agar or MSA is a commonly used selective and differential growth medium in microbiology. It encourages the growth of a group of certain bacteria while inhibiting the growth of others. It contains a high concentration (about 7.5–10%) of salt (NaCl) which is inhibitory to most bacteria—making MSA selective against most Gram-negative and selective for some Gram-positive bacteria (Staphylococcus, Enterococcus and Micrococcaceae) that tolerate high salt concentrations. It is also a differential medium for mannitol-fermenting staphylococci, containing the sugar alcohol mannitol and the indicator phenol red, a pH indicator for detecting acid produced by mannitol-fermenting staphylococci. Staphylococcus aureus produces yellow colonies with yellow zones, whereas other coagulase-negative staphylococci produce small pink or red colonies with no colour change to the medium. If an organism can ferment mannitol, an acidic byproduct is formed that causes the phenol red in the agar to turn yellow. It is used for the selective isolation of presumptive pathogenic (pp) Staphylococcus species.

== Expected results ==
- Gram + Staphylococcus: fermenting mannitol: medium turns yellow (e.g. S. aureus)
- Gram + Staphylococcus: not fermenting mannitol, medium does not change color (e.g. S. epidermidis)
- Gram + Streptococcus: inhibited growth
- Gram -: inhibited growth

== Typical composition ==
MSA typically contains:

- 5.0 g/L enzymatic digest of casein
- 5.0 g/L enzymatic digest of animal tissue
- 1.0 g/L beef extract
- 10.0 g/L D-mannitol
- 75.0 g/L sodium chloride
- 0.025 g/L phenol red
- 15.0 g/L agar
- pH 7.4 ± 0.2 at 25 °C
