= SprD =

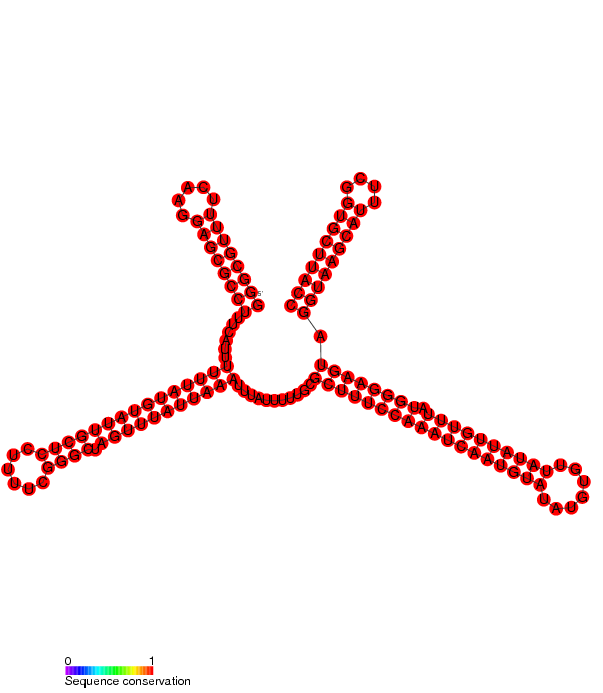
- Conserved secondary structure of SprD.

Identifiers
- Symbol: SprD
- Rfam: RF01828

Other data
- RNA type: Gene
- Domain(s): Staphylococcus aureus
- PDB structures: PDBe

In molecular biology SprD (Small pathogenicity island RNA D) is a non-coding RNA expressed on pathogenicity islands in Staphylococcus aureus. It was identified in silico along with a number of other sRNAs (SprA-G) through microarray analysis which were confirmed using a Northern blot. SprD has been found to significantly contribute to causing disease in an animal model.

== Function ==
SprD is located between genes scn and chp in the innate immune evasion cluster (IEC) of the S. aureus genome. Its placement within this region was the first indication of a virulence-factor regulatory function.

SprD binds with sbi (Staphylococcus aureus binder of IgG) mRNA which encodes an immune evasion protein. It occludes the Shine-Dalgarno sequence and the initiation codon of sbi, forming a sbi mRNA-SprD duplex repressing the translation of the mRNA.

sbi protein interferes with the host's innate immune response by binding Factor H, Complement component 3 and IgG.

== See also ==
- Protein A
- SprX
