= Accessory gene regulator =

Type of regulator gene

Accessory gene regulator (agr) is a complex 4 gene locus that is a global regulator of virulence in Staphylococcus aureus. It encodes a two-component transcriptional quorum-sensing (QS) system activated by an autoinducing, thiolactone-containing cyclic peptide (AIP).

Agr occurs in 4 allelic subtypes that have an important role in staphylococcal evolution. The corresponding AIPs are mutually cross-inhibitory, which may enhance the evolutionary separation of the 4 groups. The agr receptor, AgrC, is a model histidine phosphokinase (HPK) that has been used to decipher the molecular mechanism of signal transduction. AIP binding to the extracellular domain of AgrC causes twisting of the intracellular a-helical domain so as to enable trans-phosphorylation of the active site histidine; the inhibitory AIPs cause the α-helical domain to twist in the opposite direction, preventing trans-phosphorylation. The agr QS circuit autoactivates transcription of agrA which, in turn upregulates the phenol-souble modulins. More importantly, it activates transcription of a divergently oriented promoter whose transcript, known as RNAIII, is a 514 nt regulatory RNA that encodes δ-hemolysin and is the major effector of the agr regulon. RNAIII acts by antisense inhibition or activation of target gene translation. In vitro, early in growth, genes encoding surface proteins important for adhesion and immune evasion (such as spa – encoding proteinA) are expressed, enabling the organism to gain a foothold. Later in growth, these genes are down-regulated by RNAIII and those encoding toxins, hemolysins and other virulence-related proteins, are turned on, enabling the organism to establish and promulgate its pathological programs, such as abscess formation. It is assumed that this program operates in vivo as well. As agr is essential for staphylococcal contagion, agr-defective mutants are not contagious, but enable the organism's long-term survival in chronic conditions such as surgical implant infections, osteomyelitis or the infected lung in cystic fibrosis. In keeping with this behavior, mutations inactivating agr function enhance the stability of biofilms, which are key to the maintenance of chronic infections.

Agr is widely conserved among Bacillota and has a well-defined role in virulence regulation in several genera, especially Listeria and Clostridia.
