= Staphyloxanthin =

- Chemical structure of staphyloxanthin

Names
- IUPAC name [(2S,3R,4S,5S,6R)-3,4, 5-Trihydroxy-6-[[(12S)-12-methyltetradecanoyl]oxymethyl]oxan-2-yl] (2E,4E,6E,8E,10E,12E,14E,16E,18E)-2,6,10,15,19,23-hexamethyltetracosa-2,4,6,8,10,12,14,16,18,22-decaenoate

Identifiers
CAS Number	71869-01-7
3D model (JSmol)	Interactive image
ChEBI	CHEBI:71690
ChemSpider	65323059
PubChem CID	56928085
CompTox Dashboard (EPA)	DTXSID20222141
- InChI: InChI=1S/C51H78O8/c1-10-39(4)25-16-14-12-11-13-15-17-33-44(36-52)51(9,35-23-32-43(8)49(57)59-50-48(56)47(55)46(54)45(37-53)58-50)34-19-18-26-40(5)28-21-30-42(7)31-22-29-41(6)27-20-24-38(2)3/h17-19,21-24,26,28-33,35-36,39,44-48,50,53-56H,10-16,20,25,27,34,37H2,1-9H3/b19-18+,28-21+,31-22+,33-17-,35-23+,40-26+,41-29+,42-30+,43-32+/t39?,44?,45-,46-,47+,48-,50-,51?/m1/s1 Key: ZGBLADNGFNFPBV-OQMOJWPESA-N; InChI=1/C51H78O8/c1-10-39(4)25-16-14-12-11-13-15-17-33-44(36-52)51(9,35-23-32-43(8)49(57)59-50-48(56)47(55)46(54)45(37-53)58-50)34-19-18-26-40(5)28-21-30-42(7)31-22-29-41(6)27-20-24-38(2)3/h17-19,21-24,26,28-33,35-36,39,44-48,50,53-56H,10-16,20,25,27,34,37H2,1-9H3/b19-18+,28-21+,31-22+,33-17-,35-23+,40-26+,41-29+,42-30+,43-32+/t39?,44?,45-,46-,47+,48-,50-,51?/m1/s1 Key: ZGBLADNGFNFPBV-OQMOJWPEBF
- SMILES: O=C(O[C@H]1O[C@@H]([C@@H](O)[C@H](O)[C@H]1O)CO)\C(=C\C=C\C(C)(C\C=C\C=C(\C=C\C=C(\C=C\C=C(/C)CC\C=C(/C)C)C)C)C(\C=C/CCCCCCCC(C)CC)C=O)C

Properties
Chemical formula	C_{51}H_{78}O_{8}
Molar mass	819.177 g·mol^{−1}
- Except where otherwise noted, data are given for materials in their standard state (at 25 °C [77 °F], 100 kPa). verify (what is ?) Infobox references

Staphyloxanthin is a carotenoid pigment that is produced by some strains of Staphylococcus aureus, and is responsible for the characteristic golden color that gives S. aureus its species name. Staphyloxanthin also acts as a virulence factor. It has an antioxidant action that helps the microbe evade death by reactive oxygen species produced by the host immune system.

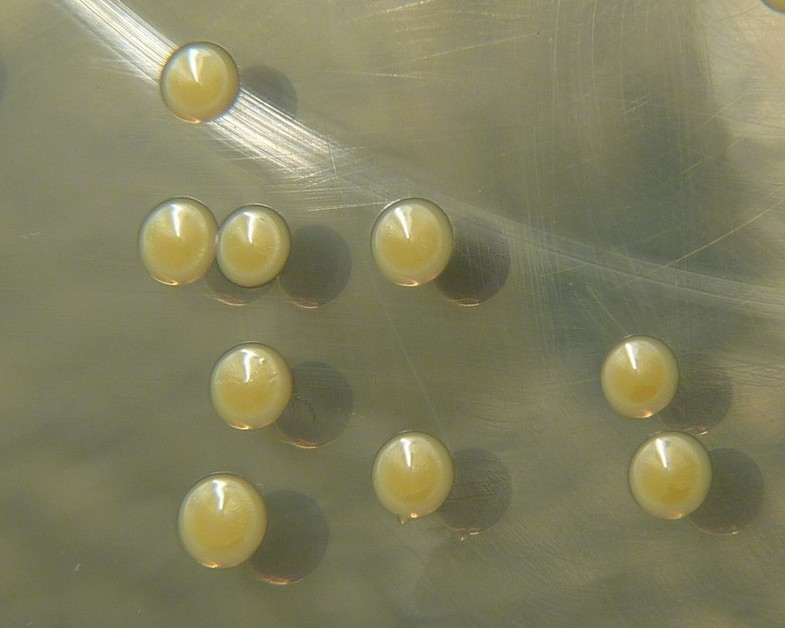
The pigment staphyloxanthin gave the bacteria Staphylococcus aureus a yellow color.

When comparing a normal strain of S. aureus with a strain modified to lack staphyloxanthin, the wildtype pigmented strain was more likely to survive incubation with an oxidizing chemical such as hydrogen peroxide than the mutant strain was. Colonies of the two strains were also exposed to human neutrophils. The mutant colonies quickly succumbed while many of the pigmented colonies survived. Wounds on mice were inoculated with the two strains. The pigmented strains created lingering abscesses. Wounds with the unpigmented strains healed quickly. These tests suggest that the staphyloxanthin may be key to the ability of S. aureus to survive immune system attacks.

Drugs designed to inhibit the bacterium's production of the staphyloxanthin may weaken it and renew its susceptibility to antibiotics. In fact, because of similarities in the pathways for biosynthesis of staphyloxanthin and human cholesterol, a drug developed in the context of cholesterol-lowering therapy was shown to block S. aureus pigmentation and disease progression in a mouse infection model.

Genomically, the crt operon primarily underlies the biosynthesis of staphyloxanthin; however, another enzyme, AldH, found outside of the operon, was later identified as also needed for the carotenoid's production. Recent comparative genomics research has further revealed that the crt operon is widespread across the Staphylococcus genus. Non-aureus pigmented staphylococci have long been noted and experimental support for staphyloxanthin production now exists in Staphylococcus xylosus, Staphylococcus warneri, Staphylococcus epidermidis, and Staphylococcus capitis. Further, some lineages of S. aureus have been found to lack crt genes and some non-aureus staphylococcal isolates have been found to feature multiple copies of crt.
