= Staphylococcus aureus delta toxin =

Delta-hemolysin

Identifiers
- Organism: Staphylococcus aureus
- Symbol: hld
- Entrez: 3919680
- PDB: 2KAM
- RefSeq (Prot): WP_000046022.1
- UniProt: P0C1V1

Other data
- Chromosome: genome: 2.09 - 2.09 Mb
Search for
- Structures: Swiss-model
- Domains: InterPro

Staphylococcus aureus delta toxin is a toxin produced by Staphylococcus aureus. It has a wide spectrum of cytolytic activity.

It is among other toxins produced by S. aureus and is part of the phenol-soluble modulin peptide family. Its alpha-helical, amphipathic structure gives it detergent-like properties, allowing it to disrupt and attach to the cytoplasmic membrane of a cell non-specifically, without a receptor, and integrate into the membrane. Delta toxin degrades the membrane on contact and forms short-lived pores, causing cell lysis and subsequent cell death.

== Structure ==
S. aureus delta toxin is encoded for by the hld gene. The hld gene, of which the 3' end encodes for delta toxin, is involved in the accessory gene regulator (agr) system. This system controls the signaling and creation of cell-associated and secreted virulence factors. Delta toxin is also secreted from S. aureus without a signal peptide, but the toxin itself has been speculated to make an effective signal peptide. The S. aureus delta toxin molecule has been speculated to oligomerize and form cation-selective ion channels in the membrane for use other than cell lysis by the toxin. The channel is proposed to be formed by six delta toxin molecules in a hexagonal arrangement.

== Function ==
Staphylococcus aureus delta toxin is a phenol-soluble modulin peptide. Because of this, the cytotoxins that are produced upon an S. aureus infection, including delta toxin, are proinflammatory molecules. Delta toxin is also a chemoattractant for leukocytes, leading to a surge of cytokines such as interleukin-8 from neutrophils at an infection site. Delta toxin molecules activate a G-protein-coupled receptor expressed in leukocytes called formyl-peptide receptor 2 (FPR2), which binds metabolites to inhibit and lower inflammation. Thus, delta toxin molecules trigger inflammation that needs to be modulated by FPR2.

Delta toxin also has moderate cytolytic abilities to lyse red and white blood cells through the use of short-lived pores in the cytoplasmic membrane. The toxin then uses host tissue as nutrients required for further S. aureus bacteria growth. Delta toxin specifically causes mast cell degranulation, contributing to allergic reactions of the skin like atopic dermatitis. This reaction is only caused by delta toxin, rather than the other toxins produced by S. aureus, proving that PSM peptides have evolved to fulfill different roles in pathogenesis.

PSMs, like S. aureus delta toxin, can prevent the activation and proliferations of CD4+ T cells, depending on interleukin-10 and TFG-beta activations. This would result in a down regulation of the adaptive immune response, potentially increasing pathogenic tolerance. This is a hypothesis as to why S. aureus is so virulent; S. aureus bacteria are able to modulate the organism's immune system to evade it.

Delta toxin is quite heat-stable, unlike S. aureus alpha and beta toxins. However, the addition of lecithin specifically prevents delta toxin from lysing cells. Delta toxin activity can also both enhanced and prevented with saturated, straight-chain fatty acids of varying lengths. Phospholipids 13 to 19 carbons in length enhanced the lytic activity of delta toxin, whereas those that were 21 to 23 carbons long were inhibitory. The length of the fatty acid chain could be related to the binding of the toxin to the membrane to be effective, as those phospholipids with longer tails prevent the toxin from getting close enough to the membrane.
