= Phenol red =

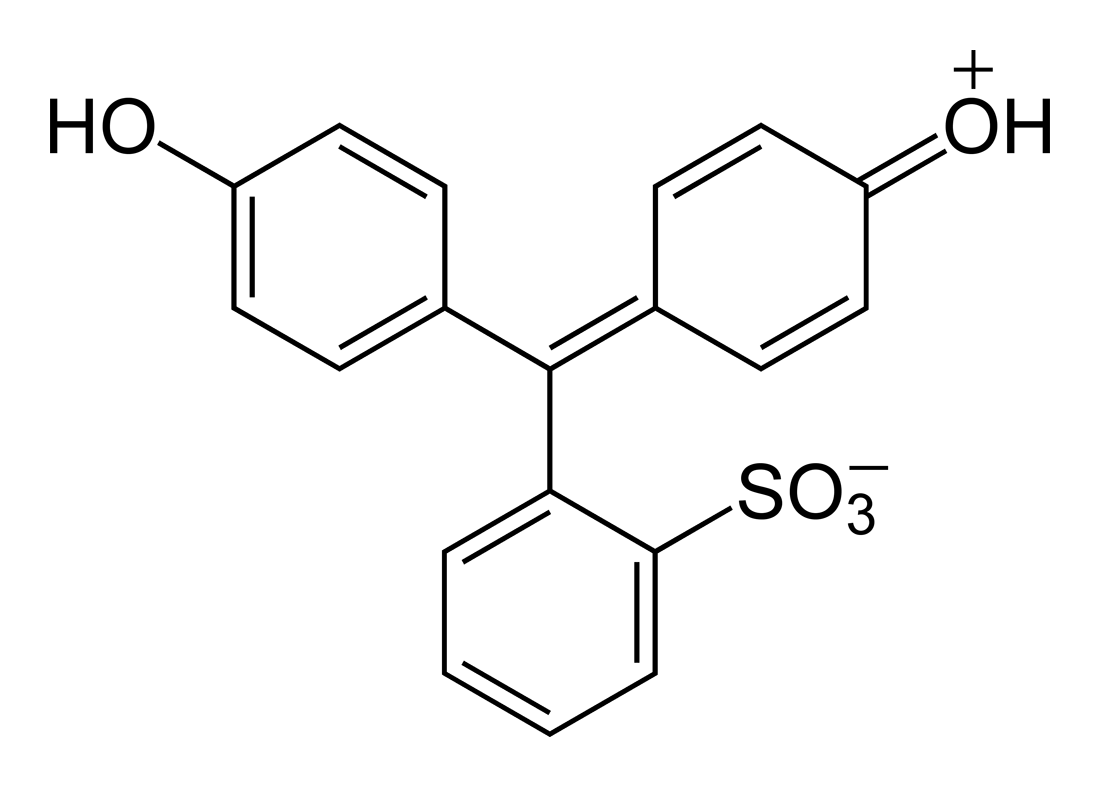
- Phenol red

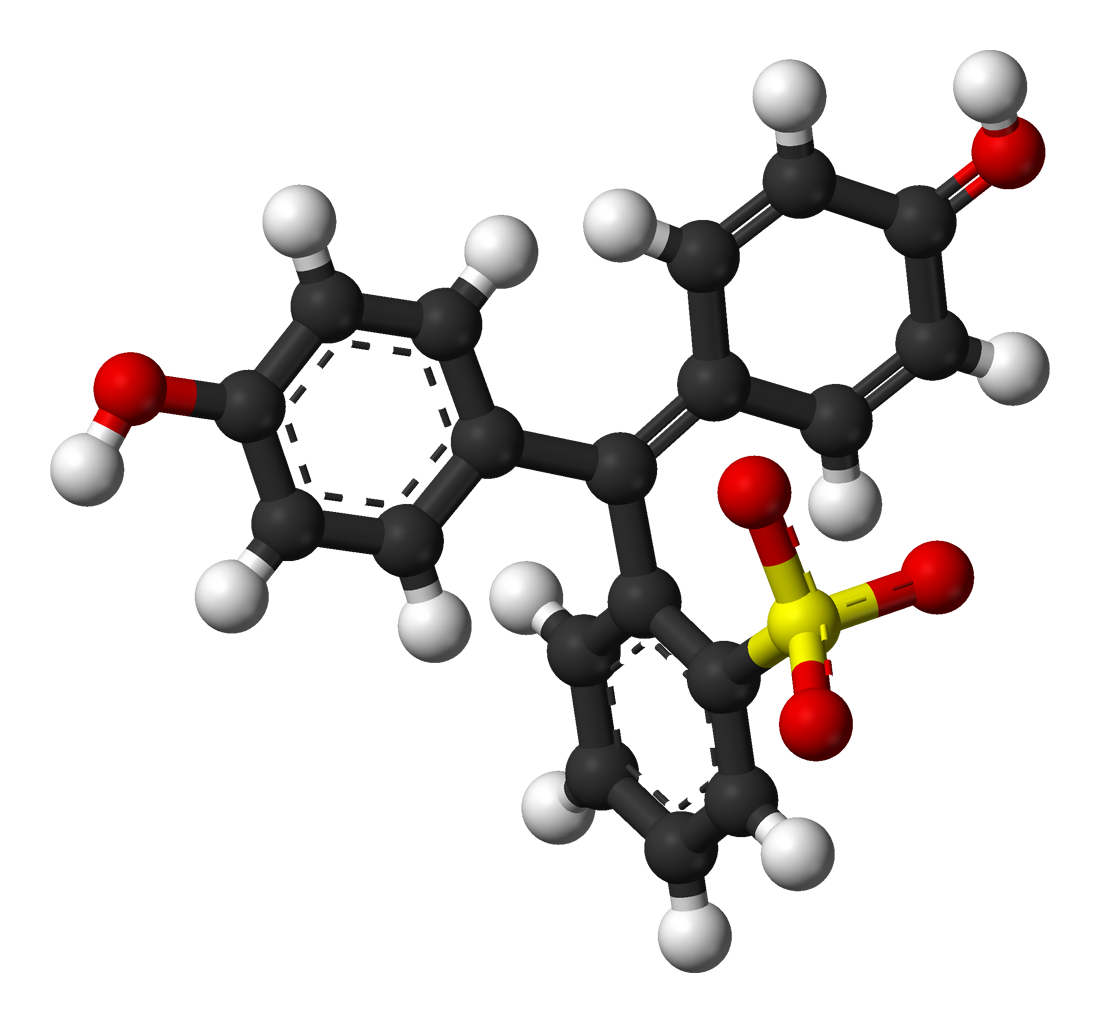
- Phenol red

Identifiers
CAS Number	143-74-8
3D model (JSmol)	Interactive image
ChEBI	CHEBI:31991
ChEMBL	ChEMBL258921
ChemSpider	4602
ECHA InfoCard	100.005.100
PubChem CID	4766
UNII	I6G9Y0J1OJ
CompTox Dashboard (EPA)	DTXSID8022408
- InChI: InChI=1S/C19H14O5S/c20-15-9-5-13(6-10-15)19(14-7-11-16(21)12-8-14)17-3-1-2-4-18(17)25(22,23)24-19/h1-12,20-21H Key: BELBBZDIHDAJOR-UHFFFAOYSA-N
- SMILES: O=S2(=O)OC(c1ccccc12)(c3ccc(O)cc3)c4ccc(O)cc4

Properties
Chemical formula	C_{19}H_{14}O_{5}S
Molar mass	354.38 g·mol^{−1}
Melting point	> 300 °C (572 °F; 573 K)

Pharmacology
ATC code	V04CH03 (WHO)
- Except where otherwise noted, data are given for materials in their standard state (at 25 °C [77 °F], 100 kPa). verify (what is ?) Infobox references

Phenol red (also known as phenolsulfonphthalein or PSP) is a pH indicator frequently used in cell biology laboratories.

== Chemical structure and properties ==
Phenol red exists as a red crystal that is stable in air. Its solubility is 0.77 grams per liter (g/L) in water and 2.9 g/L in ethanol. It is a weak acid with pK_{a} = 8.00 at 20 °C (68 °F).

A solution of phenol red is used as a pH indicator, often in cell culture. Its color exhibits a gradual transition from yellow (λ_{max} = 443 nm) to red (λ_{max} = 570 nm) over the pH range 6.8 to 8.2. Above pH 8.2, phenol red turns a bright pink (fuchsia) color.

Phenol red (pH indicator)
below pH 6.8		above pH 8.2
(yellow) 6.8	⇌	8.2 (fuchsia)

In crystalline form, and in solution under very acidic conditions (low pH), the compound exists as a zwitterion as in the structure shown above, with the sulfate group negatively charged, and the ketone group carrying an additional proton. This form is sometimes symbolically written as H^{+}_{2}PS^{−} and is orange-red. If the pH is increased (pK_{a} = 1.2), the proton from the ketone group is lost, resulting in the yellow, negatively charged ion denoted as HPS^{−}. At still higher pH (pK_{a} = 7.7), the phenol's hydroxy group loses its proton, resulting in the red ion denoted as PS^{2−}.

In several sources, the structure of phenol red is shown with the sulfur atom being part of a cyclic group, similar to the structure of phenolphthalein. However, this cyclic structure could not be confirmed by X-ray crystallography.

Several indicators share a similar structure to phenol red, including bromothymol blue, thymol blue, bromocresol purple, thymolphthalein, and phenolphthalein. (A table of other common chemical indicators is available in the article on pH indicators.)

== Uses ==
=== Phenolsulfonphthalein test ===
Phenol red was used by Leonard Rowntree and John Geraghty in the phenolsulfonphthalein test to estimate the overall blood flow through the kidney in 1911. It was the first test of kidney function and was used for almost a century but is now obsolete.

The test is based on the fact that phenol red is excreted almost entirely in the urine. Phenol red solution is administered intravenously; the urine produced is collected. By measuring the amount of phenol red excreted colorimetrically, kidney function can be determined.

=== Indicator for cell cultures ===
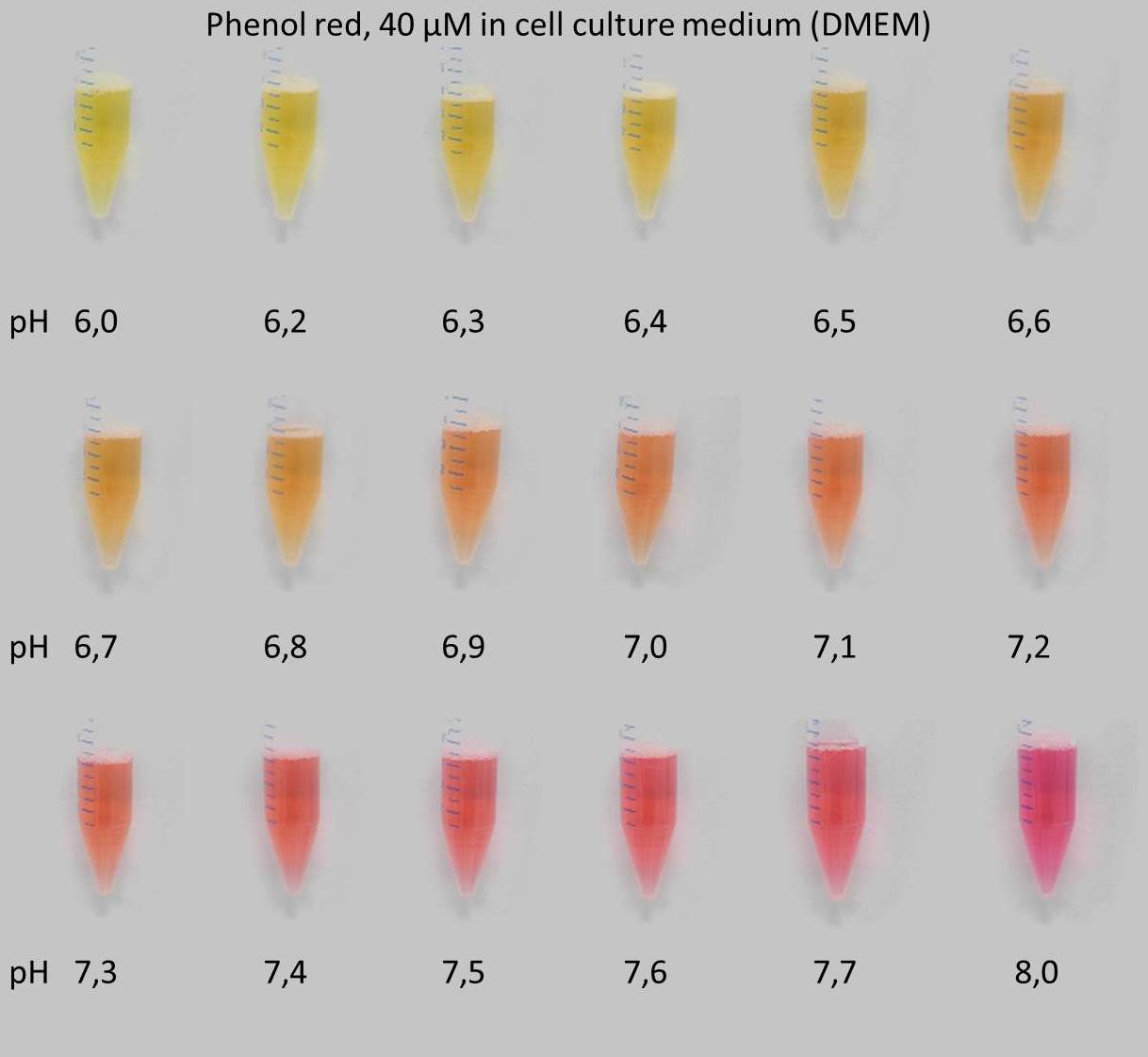
Phenol red, 40 μM: colors in cell culture medium at a pH range from 6.0 to 8.0.

Most living tissues prosper at a near-neutral pH—that is, a pH close to 7. The pH of blood ranges from 7.35 to 7.45, for instance. When cells are grown in tissue culture, the medium in which they grow is held close to this physiological pH. A small amount of phenol red added to this growth medium will have a pink-red color under normal conditions. Typically, 15 mg/L are used for cell culture.

In the event of problems, waste products produced by dying cells or overgrowth of contaminants will cause a change in pH, leading to a change in indicator color. For example, a culture of relatively slowly dividing mammalian cells can be quickly overgrown by bacterial contamination. This usually results in an acidification of the medium, turning it yellow. Many biologists find this a convenient way to rapidly check on the health of tissue cultures. In addition, the waste products produced by the mammalian cells themselves will slowly decrease the pH, gradually turning the solution orange and then yellow. This color change is an indication that even in the absence of contamination, the medium needs to be replaced (generally, this should be done before the medium has turned completely orange).

Since the color of phenol red can interfere with some spectrophotometric and fluorescent assays, many types of tissue culture media are also available without phenol red.

=== Estrogen mimic ===
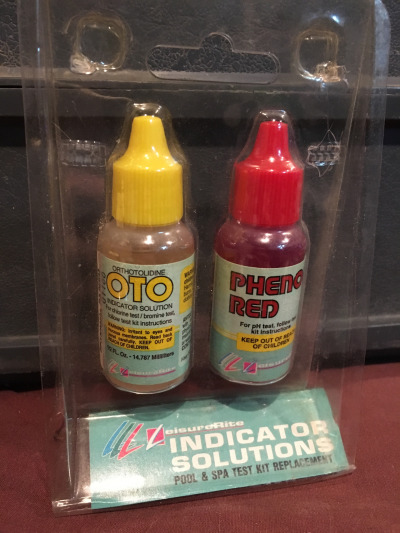
A commercial test kit for swimming pools with phenol red and an orthotolidine indicator solution

Phenol red is a weak estrogen mimic, and in cell cultures can enhance the growth of cells that express the estrogen receptor. It has been used to induce ovarian epithelial cells from post-menopausal women to differentiate into cells with properties of oocytes (eggs), with potential implications for both fertility treatment and stem cell research.

=== Use in swimming pool test kits ===
Phenol red, sometimes labelled with a different name, such as "Guardex Solution #2", is used as a pH indicator in home swimming pool test kits.

Chlorine can result in the bleaching of the dye in the absence of thiosulfate to inhibit the oxidizing chlorine. High levels of bromine can convert phenol red to bromophenol red (dibromophenolsulfonephthalein, whose lowered pK_{a} results in an indicator with a range shifted in the acidic direction – water at pH 6.8 will appear to test at 7.5). Even higher levels of bromine (>20 ppm) can result in the secondary conversion of bromophenol red to bromophenol blue with an even lower pK_{a}, erroneously giving the impression that the water has an extremely high pH despite being dangerously low.
