= Orthogonality =

Various meanings of the terms

Orthogonality is a term with various meanings depending on the context.

The line segments AB and CD are perpendicular to each other.

In mathematics, orthogonality is the generalization of the geometric notion of perpendicularity. Although many authors use the two terms perpendicular and orthogonal interchangeably, the term perpendicular is more specifically used for lines and planes that intersect to form a right angle, whereas orthogonal is used in generalizations, such as orthogonal vectors or orthogonal curves.

The term is also used in other fields like physics, art, computer science, statistics, and economics.

== Etymology ==
The word comes from the Ancient Greek ὀρθός (orthós), meaning "upright", and γωνία (gōnía), meaning "angle".

The Ancient Greek ὀρθογώνιον (orthogṓnion) and Classical Latin orthogonium originally denoted a rectangle. Later, they came to mean a right triangle. In the 12th century, the post-classical Latin word orthogonalis came to mean a right angle or something related to a right angle.

== Mathematics ==
In mathematics, orthogonality is the generalization of the geometric notion of perpendicularity to linear algebra of bilinear forms.

Two elements u and v of a vector space with bilinear form $B$ are orthogonal when $B(\mathbf{u},\mathbf{v})= 0$. Depending on the bilinear form, the vector space may contain null vectors, non-zero self-orthogonal vectors, in which case perpendicularity is replaced with hyperbolic orthogonality.

In the case of function spaces, families of functions are used to form an orthogonal basis, such as in the contexts of orthogonal polynomials, orthogonal functions, and combinatorics.

Orthogonality and rotation of coordinate systems compared between left: Euclidean space through circular angle ϕ, right: in Minkowski spacetime through hyperbolic angle ϕ (red lines labelled c denote the worldlines of a light signal, a vector is orthogonal to itself if it lies on this line).

== Physics ==
=== Optics ===
In optics, polarization states are said to be orthogonal when they propagate independently of each other, as in vertical and horizontal linear polarization or right-handed and left-handed circular polarization.

=== Special relativity ===
In special relativity, a time axis determined by a rapidity of motion is hyperbolic-orthogonal to a space axis of simultaneous events, also determined by the rapidity. The theory features relativity of simultaneity.

==== Hyperbolic orthogonality ====
Euclidean orthogonality is preserved by rotation in the left diagram; hyperbolic orthogonality with respect to hyperbola (B) is preserved by hyperbolic rotation in the right diagram.

In geometry, given a pair of conjugate hyperbolas, two conjugate diameters are hyperbolically orthogonal. This relationship of diameters was described by Apollonius of Perga and has been modernized using analytic geometry. Hyperbolically orthogonal lines appear in special relativity as temporal and spatial directions that show the relativity of simultaneity.

Keeping time and space axes hyperbolically orthogonal, as in Minkowski space, gives a constant result when measurements are taken of the speed of light.

=== Quantum mechanics ===
In quantum mechanics, a sufficient (but not necessary) condition that two eigenstates of a Hermitian operator, $\psi_m$ and $\psi_n$, are orthogonal is that they correspond to different eigenvalues. This means, in Dirac notation, that $\langle \psi_m | \psi_n \rangle = 0$ if $\psi_m$ and $\psi_n$ correspond to different eigenvalues. This follows from the fact that Schrödinger's equation is a Sturm–Liouville equation (in Schrödinger's formulation) or that observables are given by Hermitian operators (in Heisenberg's formulation).

== Art ==
In art, the perspective (imaginary) lines pointing to the vanishing point are referred to as "orthogonal lines". The term "orthogonal line" often has a quite different meaning in the literature of modern art criticism. Many works by painters such as Piet Mondrian and Burgoyne Diller are noted for their exclusive use of "orthogonal lines" — not, however, with reference to perspective, but rather referring to lines that are straight and exclusively horizontal or vertical, forming right angles where they intersect. For example, an essay of the Thyssen-Bornemisza Museum states that "Mondrian [...] dedicated his entire oeuvre to the investigation of the balance between orthogonal lines and primary colours."

== Computer science ==
Orthogonality in programming language design is the ability to use various language features in arbitrary combinations with consistent results. This usage was introduced by Van Wijngaarden in the design of Algol 68:

The number of independent primitive concepts has been minimized in order that the language be easy to describe, to learn, and to implement. On the other hand, these concepts have been applied “orthogonally” in order to maximize the expressive power of the language while trying to avoid deleterious superfluities.

Orthogonality is a system design property which guarantees that modifying the technical effect produced by a component of a system neither creates nor propagates side effects to other components of the system. Typically this is achieved through the separation of concerns and encapsulation, and it is essential for feasible and compact designs of complex systems. The emergent behavior of a system consisting of components should be controlled strictly by formal definitions of its logic and not by side effects resulting from poor integration, i.e., non-orthogonal design of modules and interfaces. Orthogonality reduces testing and development time because it is easier to verify designs that neither cause side effects nor depend on them.

=== Orthogonal instruction set ===
An instruction set is said to be orthogonal if it lacks redundancy (i.e., there is only a single instruction that can be used to accomplish a given task) and is designed such that instructions can use any register in any addressing mode. This terminology results from considering an instruction as a vector whose components are the instruction fields. One field identifies the registers to be operated upon and another specifies the addressing mode. An orthogonal instruction set uniquely encodes all combinations of registers and addressing modes.

== Telecommunications ==
In telecommunications, multiple access schemes are orthogonal when an ideal receiver can completely reject arbitrarily strong unwanted signals from the desired signal using different basis functions. One such scheme is time-division multiple access (TDMA), where the orthogonal basis functions are nonoverlapping rectangular pulses ("time slots").

=== Orthogonal frequency-division multiplexing ===
Another scheme is orthogonal frequency-division multiplexing (OFDM), which refers to the use, by a single transmitter, of a set of frequency multiplexed signals with the exact minimum frequency spacing needed to make them orthogonal so that they do not interfere with each other. Well known examples include (a, g, and n) versions of 802.11 Wi-Fi; WiMAX; ITU-T G.hn, DVB-T, the terrestrial digital TV broadcast system used in most of the world outside North America; and DMT (Discrete Multi Tone), the standard form of ADSL.

In OFDM, the subcarrier frequencies are chosen so that the subcarriers are orthogonal to each other, meaning that crosstalk between the subchannels is eliminated and intercarrier guard bands are not required. This greatly simplifies the design of both the transmitter and the receiver. In conventional FDM, a separate filter for each subchannel is required.

== Statistics, econometrics, and economics ==
When performing statistical analysis, independent variables that affect a particular dependent variable are said to be orthogonal if they are uncorrelated, since the covariance forms an inner product. In this case the same results are obtained for the effect of any of the independent variables upon the dependent variable, regardless of whether one models the effects of the variables individually with simple regression or simultaneously with multiple regression. If correlation is present, the factors are not orthogonal and different results are obtained by the two methods. This usage arises from the fact that if centered by subtracting the expected value (the mean), uncorrelated variables are orthogonal in the geometric sense discussed above, both as observed data (i.e., vectors) and as random variables (i.e., density functions). One econometric formalism that is alternative to the maximum likelihood framework, the Generalized Method of Moments, relies on orthogonality conditions. In particular, the Ordinary Least Squares estimator may be easily derived from an orthogonality condition between the explanatory variables and model residuals.

== Taxonomy ==
In taxonomy, an orthogonal classification is one in which no item is a member of more than one group, that is, the classifications are mutually exclusive.

== Chemistry and biochemistry ==
In chemistry and biochemistry, an orthogonal interaction occurs when there are two pairs of substances and each substance can interact with their respective partner, but does not interact with either substance of the other pair. For example, DNA has two orthogonal pairs: cytosine and guanine form a base-pair, and adenine and thymine form another base-pair, but other base-pair combinations are strongly disfavored. The term "orthogonal" was first introduced into the chemical vocabulary in 1977 by George Barany and R. Bruce Merrifield in a paper describing a new amino protecting group, with "orthogonal" being defined as “a set of completely independent classes of protecting groups… [where]… each class of groups can be removed in any order and in the presence of all other classes”. As a chemical example, tetrazine reacts with transcyclooctene and azide reacts with cyclooctyne without any cross-reaction, so these are mutually orthogonal reactions, and so, can be performed simultaneously and selectively.

=== Organic synthesis ===
In organic synthesis, orthogonal protection is a strategy allowing the deprotection of functional groups independently of each other.

=== Bioorthogonal chemistry ===
The term bioorthogonal chemistry refers to any chemical reaction that can occur inside of living systems without interfering with native biochemical processes. The term was coined by Carolyn R. Bertozzi in 2003. Since its introduction, the concept of the bioorthogonal reaction has enabled the study of biomolecules such as glycans, proteins, and lipids in real time in living systems without cellular toxicity. A number of chemical ligation strategies have been developed that fulfill the requirements of bioorthogonality, including the 1,3-dipolar cycloaddition between azides and cyclooctynes (also termed copper-free click chemistry), between nitrones and cyclooctynes, oxime/hydrazone formation from aldehydes and ketones, the tetrazine ligation, the isocyanide-based click reaction, and most recently, the quadricyclane ligation.

=== Supramolecular chemistry ===
In supramolecular chemistry the notion of orthogonality refers to the possibility of two or more supramolecular, often non-covalent, interactions being compatible; reversibly forming without interference from the other.

=== Analytical chemistry ===
In analytical chemistry, analyses are "orthogonal" if they make a measurement or identification in completely different ways, thus increasing the reliability of the measurement. Orthogonal testing thus can be viewed as "cross-checking" of results, and the "cross" notion corresponds to the etymologic origin of orthogonality. Orthogonal testing is often required as a part of a new drug application.

== System reliability ==
In the field of system reliability orthogonal redundancy is that form of redundancy where the form of backup device or method is completely different from the prone to error device or method. The failure mode of an orthogonally redundant back-up device or method does not intersect with and is completely different from the failure mode of the device or method in need of redundancy to safeguard the total system against catastrophic failure.

== Neuroscience ==
In neuroscience, a sensory map in the brain which has overlapping stimulus coding (e.g. location and quality) is called an orthogonal map.

== Philosophy ==
In philosophy, two topics, authors, or pieces of writing are said to be "orthogonal" to each other when they do not substantively cover what could be considered potentially overlapping or competing claims. Thus, texts in philosophy can either support and complement one another, they can offer competing explanations or systems, or they can be orthogonal to each other in cases where the scope, content, and purpose of the pieces of writing are entirely unrelated.

== Gaming ==
In board games such as chess which feature a grid of squares, 'orthogonal' is used to mean "in the same row/'rank' or column/'file'". This is the counterpart to squares which are "diagonally adjacent". In the ancient Chinese board game Go a player can capture the stones of an opponent by occupying all orthogonally adjacent points.

== Law ==
In law, orthogonality can refer to interests in a proceeding that are not aligned, but also bear no correlation or effect on each other, so as not to create a conflict of interest.

== Other examples ==
Stereo vinyl records encode both the left and right stereo channels in a single groove. The V-shaped groove in the vinyl has walls that are 90 degrees to each other, with variations in each wall separately encoding one of the two analogue channels that make up the stereo signal. The cartridge senses the motion of the stylus following the groove in two orthogonal directions: 45 degrees from vertical to either side. A pure horizontal motion corresponds to a mono signal, equivalent to a stereo signal in which both channels carry identical (in-phase) signals.

== See also ==
- Orthogonal ligand-protein pair
- Orthogonal polyhedron
- Up tack
