= Ellen Sletten =

American chemist

Ellen M. Sletten
- Education: Stonehill College; University of California, Berkeley
- Known for: Bioorthogonal Chemistry
- Scientific career
- Workplaces: University of California, Los Angeles; Massachusetts Institute of Technology
- Thesis: Bioorthogonal Chemistries for Labeling Living Systems (2011)
- Doctoral advisor: Carolyn R. Bertozzi
- Website: Sletten Group

Ellen Sletten is an American chemist who is the John McTague Career Development Chair at University of California, Los Angeles. Her research considers the use of physical organic chemistry for diagnostics and medical therapies.

== Early life and education ==
Sletten was born in New Hampshire. She earned her bachelor's degree in chemistry at Stonehill College, a liberal arts school in Easton, Massachusetts. Her undergraduate dissertation considered the stereospecific synthesis of pyrrolizidines that could be used as glycosidase inhibitors. She moved to the West Coast of the United States for her graduate studies, joining the laboratory of Carolyn R. Bertozzi at the University of California, Berkeley to work on bioorthogonal chemistry. In particular, Sletten made use of bioorthogonal chemistry for the labelling of living systems, and the synthesis of cyclooctyne reagents in copper-free click chemistry After graduating, Sletten joined the laboratory of Timothy M. Swager at Massachusetts Institute of Technology. At MIT, Sletten worked on fluorescence-based sensors and novel approaches to complex emulsions.

== Research and career ==
In 2015 Sletten was appointed to the faculty at the University of California, Los Angeles (UCLA). Her research considers the use of physical organic chemistry for diagnostics and medical therapies. In 2017 she realised non-toxic fluorescent compounds that emit in the short-wave infrared region (1000 – 2000 nm), making them appropriate for rapid, in vivo optical diagnostics. At the time, short-wave infrared imaging was widely used in astronomy, but Sletten led its expansion into clinical applications. Short-wave infrared light doesn't scatter much in human tissue, and results in low tissue fluorescence compared to the near-infrared light. By combining the short-wave infrared (flavylium heterocycle-based) fluorophore with lasers and an appropriate camera, Sletten showed it was possible to capture multi-colour images of the veins and arteries of moving mice. As the imaging system could provide real-time feedback, it could be used for image-guided surgery. She has explored the use of nanomaterials containing fluorine for personalised medicine.

== Selected publications ==
- Sletten, Ellen M.; Bertozzi, Carolyn R. (2009). "Bioorthogonal Chemistry: Fishing for Selectivity in a Sea of Functionality". Angewandte Chemie International Edition. 48 (38): 6974–6998. doi:10.1002/anie.200900942. ISSN 1521-3773. PMC 2864149. PMID 19714693.
- Sletten, Ellen M.; Bertozzi, Carolyn R. (2011-09-20). "From Mechanism to Mouse: A Tale of Two Bioorthogonal Reactions". Accounts of Chemical Research. 44 (9): 666–676. doi:10.1021/ar200148z. ISSN 0001-4842. PMC 3184615. PMID 21838330.
- Jewett, John C.; Sletten, Ellen M.; Bertozzi, Carolyn R. (2010-03-24). "Rapid Cu-Free Click Chemistry with Readily Synthesized Biarylazacyclooctynones". Journal of the American Chemical Society. 132 (11): 3688–3690. doi:10.1021/ja100014q. ISSN 0002-7863. PMC 2840677. PMID 20187640.

== Awards and honours ==
- 2009 American Chemical Society Division of Organic Chemistry Graduate Fellowship
- 2018 Thieme Chemistry Journal Award
- 2018 Alpha Chi Sigma Glenn T. Seaborg Award
- 2018 Sloan Research Fellowship
- 2018 NIH Director's New Innovator Award
- 2019 American Chemical Society Polymeric Materials: Science and Engineering Young Investigator Award
- 2020 International Chemical Biology Society Young Chemical Biologist Award
