= Béla Király =

Hungarian Army officer, professor, and politician (1912–2009)

Colonel general Dr. Béla Király
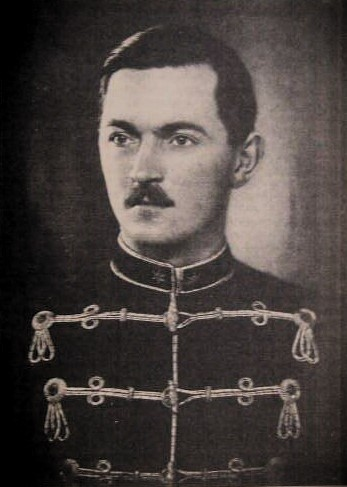
- Király in 1935

Commander of the National Guard
- In office 31 October – 12 November 1956
- Prime Minister: Imre Nagy
- Deputy: Sándor Kopácsi
- Minister of Defence: Pál Maléter
- Preceded by: Office established
- Succeeded by: Office abolished

Member of the National Assembly
- In office 2 May 1990 – 27 June 1994

Personal details
- Born: 14 April 1912 Kaposvár, Kingdom of Hungary
- Died: 4 July 2009 (aged 97) Budapest, Hungary
- Resting place: New Public Cemetery Budapest
- Party: SZDSZ
- Education: Ludovica Academy (BA); Columbia University (MA, PhD)

Military service
- Allegiance: Kingdom of Hungary; People's Republic of Hungary; Hungarian revolutionaries
- Branch/service: Hungarian army
- Years of service: 1930–1951
- Rank: Colonel general
- Commands: National Guard
- Battles/wars: World War II; Hungarian Revolution of 1956

Béla Király (14 April 1912 – 4 July 2009) was a Hungarian army officer before, during, and after World War II. After the war, he was sentenced to death under the Soviet-allied regime, but was later released. After his release, he commanded the National Guard in the 1956 Hungarian Revolution. He then fled to the United States, where he became an academic historian. He returned to Hungary after the collapse of the Soviet Bloc and was elected a member of Hungarian Parliament.

== Early life ==
Király was born in Kaposvár, Hungary, the son of a station master. As a youth he bred pigeons, a lifelong interest. His ambition to be a veterinary surgeon foundered because his family could not afford the fees. Color blindness barred his employment by the railroad. In 1930, military service became compulsory and he joined the army. Finding it interesting, he finished the Ludovika Military Academy in the top 5% of his class, and was commissioned a second lieutenant 20 August 1935. As a student at the General Staff Academy he was promoted to captain in December 1942.

== World War II and postwar imprisonment ==
Hungary joined the Axis powers and declared war on the Soviet Union in 1941. Király saw combat on the Eastern Front and was twice wounded. In 1943 he commanded 400 men guarding a Jewish labor battalion in the Don River valley. Contrary to orders, he provided them with warm clothing, decent food, and medical attention. In 1993, Yad Vashem named him one of the "Righteous Among the Nations", recognizing his humane treatment of the Jewish prisoners.

In March 1945 Király commanded the defense of Kőszeg. Upon surrendering the city to the Red Army, he was arrested and sent to Siberia as a prisoner of war. He returned home following the Paris Peace Treaties, and joined the Hungarian Communist Party and the new Hungarian People's Army.

Communist officials warned him against his 1947 marriage to the widowed niece of far-right former prime minister Gyula Gömbös, who was, for much of his career, anti-Semitic. He expected to be sacked when General György Pálffy summoned him, but instead was appointed to command the Training Department. He was promoted to general in 1950, and later to the rank of major general. In 1950, he was put in command of the infantry. He was expected to command the Hungarian component of a planned Soviet invasion of Yugoslavia following the Tito–Stalin Split. Stalin ceased the operation, however, discouraged by the success of American intervention in the Korean War. According to Király, the situation in Korea "nipped Stalin's pet project in the bud".

In 1951, the Mátyás Rákosi regime arrested him on charges of subversion, sedition, and espionage. He was sentenced on January 15, 1952 to death by hanging. His wife was detained by the ÁVH from August 1951 until August 1953. She divorced him in 1955. He then learned that his sentence had been commuted to life imprisonment at hard labor. In September 1956 the government of Ernő Gerő paroled him along with other prisoners, a measure intended to soften public unrest.

== Role in the 1956 Hungarian Revolution ==
The Hungarian Revolution of 1956 began shortly after his release from prison. He was ill and recovering from surgery, but he escaped the hospital to join the Hungarian revolutionaries and accept appointment as commander-in-chief of the military guard and military commander of Budapest against the Soviets.

"I was skin and bones coming out of five years of imprisonment," Agence France-Presse quoted him as saying in 2006. "I was far from being healed, so I had to slip out of the hospital because the doctors would not let me go."

— Béla Király, Agence France-Presse 2006

Violence broke out in Budapest on October 23, 1956. Soviet troops, unprepared for the strength of the revolutionary forces, arranged a ceasefire on October 28, and began to retreat from the city. The violence subsisted, however, as pro-Nagy communists and various nationalist factions engineered purges of pro-Soviet party members in the city. Király, sensing a chaotic fragmentation of the revolutionary forces, sought to unite various anti-Soviet factions into a National Guard. On October 30, 1956, Király-led revolutionaries attacked the building of the Central Committee of the Communist Party. The revolutionaries detained dozens of suspected pro-Soviets, executing many on the spot. Similar purges continued throughout the city.

In spite of the continued violence directed against pro-Soviet communists, Soviet correspondent Anastas Mikoyan advised against a Soviet invasion, wishing for the Hungarian communists to suppress the "counter-revolution" themselves. This inaction led many pro-Soviets to question their loyalties. As Nikita Khrushchev lost confidence in the ability of the Hungarian communists to suppress the uprising, he directed the Soviet army to invade Budapest on November 4.

Király recognized his forces, loyal to Nagy, had no hope of victory over the Soviet army. However, he resented Soviet ambassador Yuri Andropov's concealing of the imminent invasion, which Nikita Khrushchev had officially decided upon 3 days prior.

Here was this man Andropov who clearly understood what was going on, Mr. Kiraly said bitterly, yet he pretended until the last moment to me and to the Prime Minister and to others that everything was business as usual. Even pirates, before they attack another ship, hoist a black flag. He was absolutely calculating.

— Béla Király, 1982 interview with R.W. Apple, Jr.

After the Soviets successfully suppressed the revolution, Király fled to the United States through Austria to avoid capture. He was, however, sentenced to death in absentia back in the Soviet Union (a fate which other revolutionary leaders like Nagy did not escape).

== Time in the United States ==
Király was well regarded in the United States, as the U.S. had been supportive of the Nagy-led government to which Király had been loyal. He arrived speaking good English, having taught himself through an English-Hungarian dictionary while in prison. By 1963, Király was the President of the Hungarian Freedom Fighters Federation, a group sponsored by the United States Central Intelligence Agency, which served as a continuation of the HFFF formed in pre-1956 Hungary. He enrolled in Columbia University earned a Master's degree in history in 1959, and a Ph.D. in 1966. His doctoral dissertation topic was "1790: Society in Royal Hungary," and was later revised and published as Hungary in the Late Eighteenth Century: The Decline of Enlightened Despotism (New York: Columbia University Press, 1969). The supervisor for his dissertation was Robert A. Kann, an Austrian-born historian at Rutgers University who spent several years as a visiting professor at Columbia.

Király dedicated his second book, Ferenc Deák (Boston: Twayne Publishers, 1975), to Kann, and also contributed to a Festschrift for Kann: Intellectual and Social Developments in the Habsburg Empire from Maria Theresa to World War I: Essays Dedicated to Robert A. Kann, ed. Stanley B. Winters and Joseph Held (Boulder: East European quarterly; distributed by Columbia University Press, 1975).

From 1964 he taught Military History at Brooklyn College, and became chairman of the history department. At Brooklyn College, he was the senior thesis advisor of his student Fran Fraschilla, who went on to become a college basketball coach. He retired as Professor Emeritus in 1982.

During Király's tenure he served as director of the Society In Change Program on East Central Europe, supervised Brooklyn College Press (the College's Publishing House), and was an adviser to the Brooklyn College Military History Club. The Brooklyn College Bela K. Kiraly Award, awarded to undergraduate students for outstanding work in modern history, bears his name.

== Return to Hungary ==
After the collapse of the Soviet Bloc, he was an invited guest at Imre Nagy's funeral and re-interment, June 1989. He moved back to Hungary later that year, and was elected to the Hungarian National Assembly, representing his birthplace Kaposvár. He served from May–November 1990 as an independent deputy, then joined the Alliance of Free Democrats (SZDSZ) parliamentary group, later assuming the role of a government adviser. In 2004, he was made an associate member of the Hungarian Academy of Sciences.

Király died in his sleep in Budapest on 4 July 2009, aged 97.

== Selected works ==
- Király, Béla K. (1969). Hungary in the late eighteenth century; the decline of enlightened despotism. New York: Columbia University Press. ISBN 9780598122759. LCCN 69019459.
- Király, Béla K. (1975). Ferenc Deák. Boston: Twayne Publishers. ISBN 0805730303. LCCN 74020558.
- Király, Béla K., ed. (1975). Tolerance and movements of religious dissent in Eastern Europe. Boulder [Colo.] : East European Quarterly. New York. ISBN 0914710060. LCCN 75006229. distributed by Columbia University Press
- Király, Béla K.; Barany, George, eds. (1977). East Central European perceptions of early America. Lisse: Peter de Ridder Press. ISBN 9789031601462. LCCN 77369620.
- Kann, Robert A.; Király, Béla K.; Fichtner, Paula S., eds. (1977). The Habsburg Empire in World War I : essays on the intellectual, military, political, and economic aspects of the Habsburg war effort. Boulder Colo., New York: East European Quarterly. ISBN 0914710168. LCCN 76047779. distributed by Columbia University Press
- Király, Béla K.; Jónás, Paul, eds. (1978). The Hungarian revolution of 1956 in retrospect. introd. by G. H. N. Seton-Watson. Boulder Colo., New York: East European quarterly. ISBN 0914710338. LCCN 77082394. distributed by Columbia University Press
- Király, Béla K. (2001). Basic History of Modern Hungary, 1867–1999. Malabar, Florida: Krieger Pub. ISBN 0-89464-950-7. LCCN 2001018642.
- Király, Béla Kálmán; Rothenberg, Gunther E., eds. (1979). Special topics and generalizations on the 18th and 19th centuries. New York: Brooklyn College Press. ISBN 0930888049. LCCN 79051780. Distributed by Columbia University Press
- Rothenberg, Gunther E.; Király, Béla K.; Sugar, Peter F., eds. (1982). East Central European society and war in the prerevolutionary eighteenth century. New York: Boulder Social Science Monographs. ISBN 0930888197. LCCN 81050886. Distributed by Columbia University Press
