= Tris(benzyltriazolylmethyl)amine =

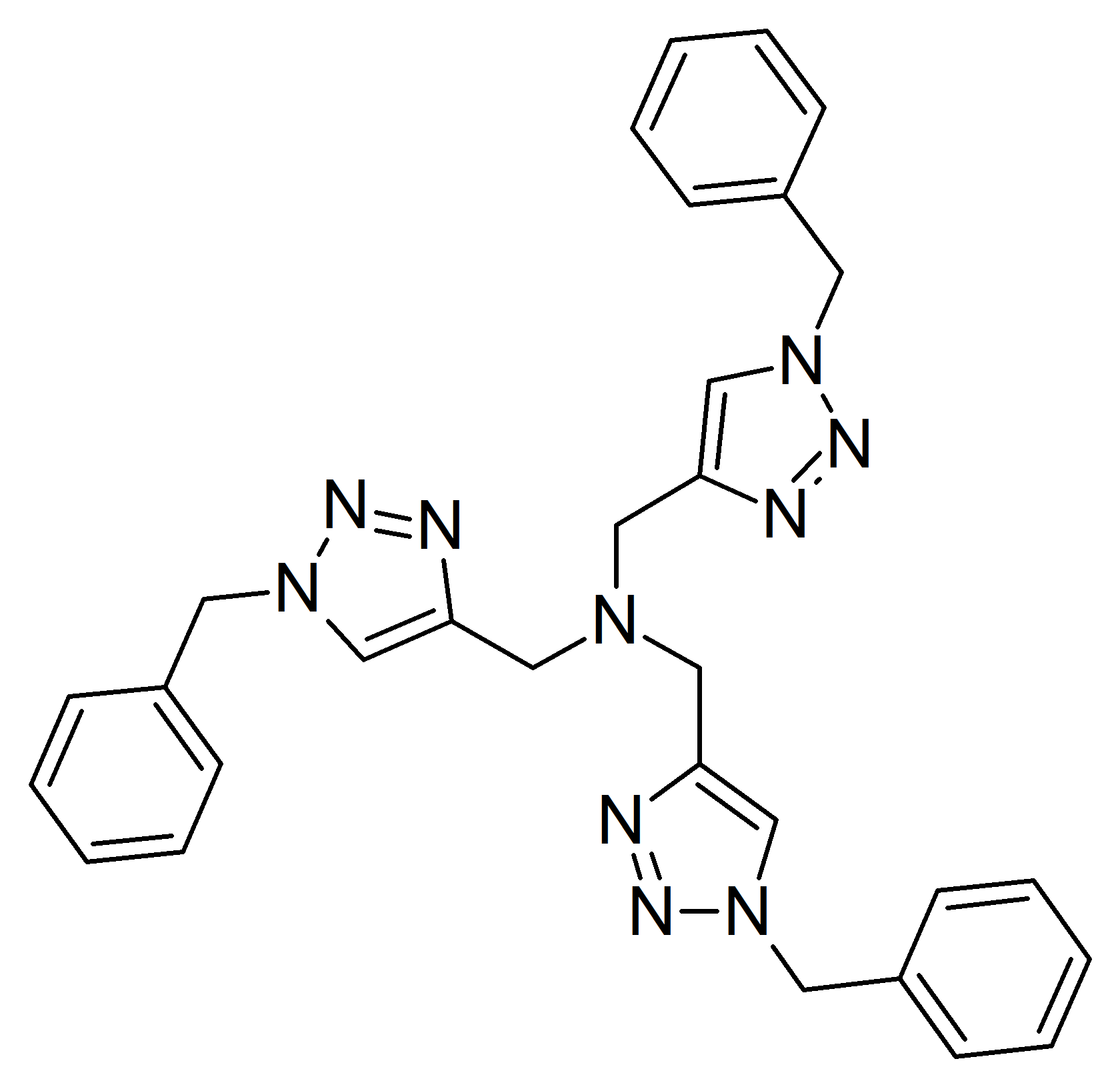

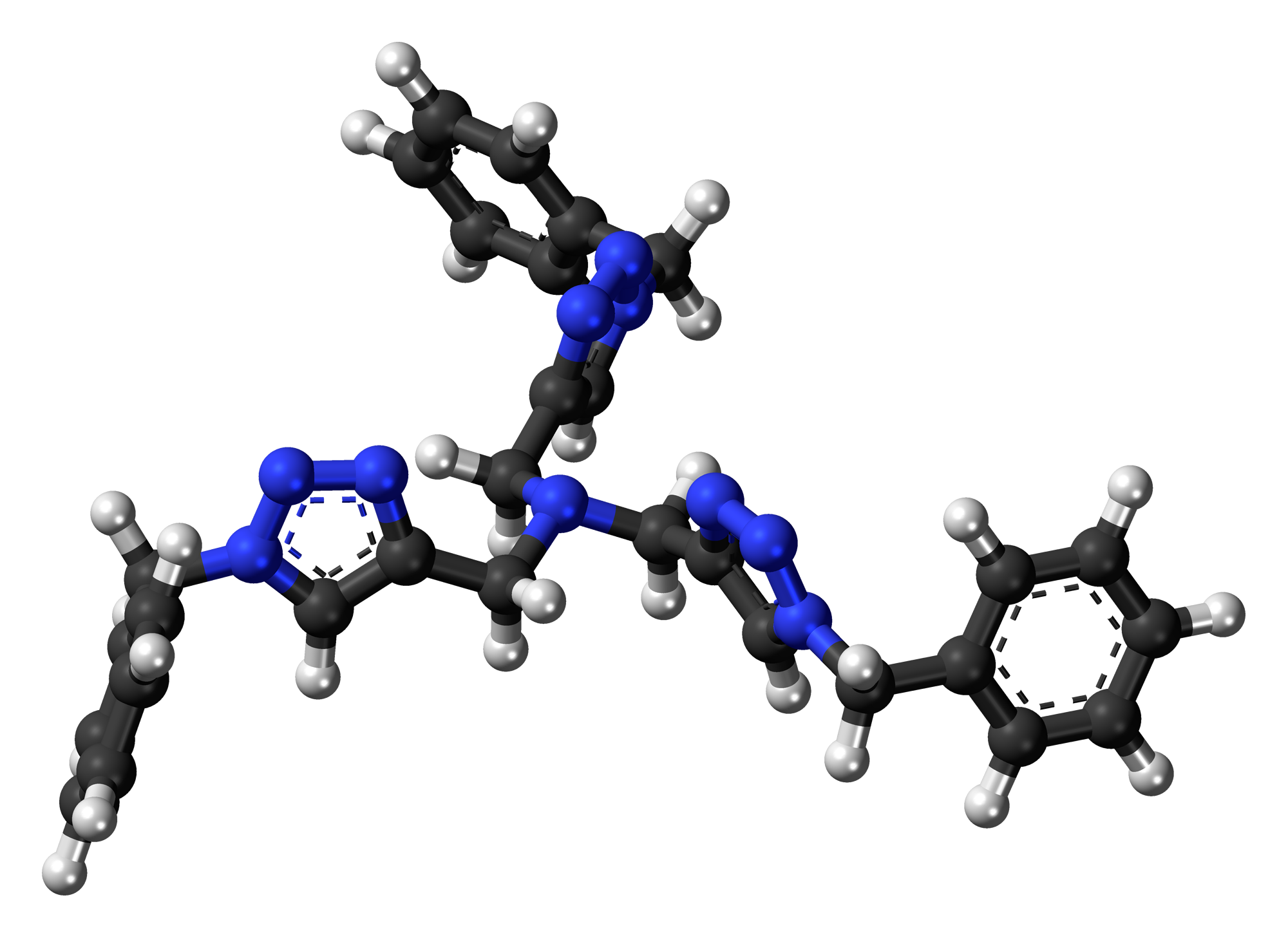

Names
- Preferred IUPAC name 1-(1-Benzyl-1H-1,2,3-triazol-4-yl)-N,N-bis[(1-benzyl-1H-1,2,3-triazol-4-yl)methyl]methanamine

Identifiers
CAS Number	510758-28-8
3D model (JSmol)	Interactive image
ChemSpider	9378431
ECHA InfoCard	100.221.401
PubChem CID	11203363
UNII	TC4DSF6TA2
CompTox Dashboard (EPA)	DTXSID20458589
- InChI: InChI=1S/C30H30N10/c1-4-10-25(11-5-1)16-38-22-28(31-34-38)19-37(20-29-23-39(35-32-29)17-26-12-6-2-7-13-26)21-30-24-40(36-33-30)18-27-14-8-3-9-15-27/h1-15,22-24H,16-21H2 Key: WKGZJBVXZWCZQC-UHFFFAOYSA-N; InChI=1S/C30H30N10/c1-4-10-25(11-5-1)16-38-22-28(31-34-38)19-37(20-29-23-39(35-32-29)17-26-12-6-2-7-13-26)21-30-24-40(36-33-30)18-27-14-8-3-9-15-27/h1-15,22-24H,16-21H2; InChI=1S/C30H30N10/c1-4-10-25(11-5-1)16-38-22-28(31-34-38)19-37(20-29-23-39(35-32-29)17-26-12-6-2-7-13-26)21-30-24-40(36-33-30)18-27-14-8-3-9-15-27/h1-15,22-24H,16-21H2 Key: WKGZJBVXZWCZQC-UHFFFAOYSA-N
- SMILES: c1ccc(cc1)Cn2cc(nn2)CN(Cc3cn(nn3)Cc4ccccc4)Cc5cn(nn5)Cc6ccccc6

Properties
Chemical formula	C_{30}H_{30}N_{10}
Molar mass	530.640 g·mol^{−1}
- Except where otherwise noted, data are given for materials in their standard state (at 25 °C [77 °F], 100 kPa). verify (what is ?) Infobox references

Tris((1-benzyl-4-triazolyl)methyl)amine (TBTA) is a tertiary amine containing the 1,2,3-triazole moiety. When used as a ligand, complexed to copper(I), it allows for quantitative, regioselective formal Huisgen 1,3-dipolar cycloadditions between alkynes and azides, in a variety of aqueous and organic solvents.

It is believed that the ligand promotes catalysis through the stabilization of the copper(I)-oxidation state, while still allowing for the catalytic cycle of the CuAAC reaction to proceed. TBTA is an effective CuAAC ligand for preventing protodeboronation when the alkyne or azide contains a boronic acid or boronic ester moiety.

Single crystal X-ray diffraction of the Cu(I) complex of tris((1-benzyl-4-triazolyl)methyl)amine revealed an unusual dinuclear dication with one triazole unit bridging two metal centers, and is an effective catalyst for the 'click' cycloaddition reaction. The structure of the complex of TBTA with Cu(II) in the crystalline state is trigonal bipyramidal and can be reduced to the active 'click' catalyst form by sodium ascorbate, copper metal, or other reducing agents.

In the literature, it has been gaining widespread use as a biochemical tool for the tagging of proteins and enzymes. The compound is now commercially available through Sigma-Aldrich and Invitrogen. It may be prepared by the click reaction between tripropargylamine and benzyl azide:

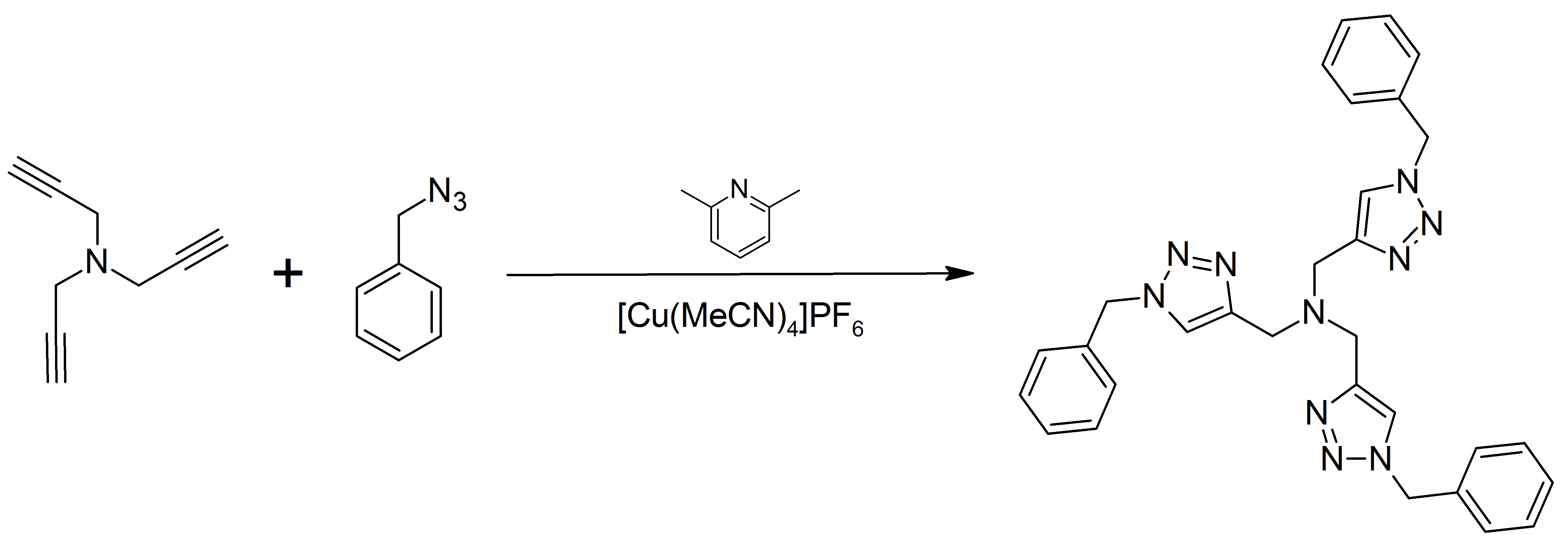
