= C6H6O =

The molecular formula C_{6}H_{6}O (molar mass: 94.11 g/mol, exact mass: 94.0419 u) may refer to:

- Oxanorbornadiene (OND)
- Oxepin
- Phenol, also called carbolic acid or phenolic acid
