= Gunther E. Rothenberg =

American military historian

Gunther Rothenberg
- Born: 11 July 1923; Berlin, Germany
- Died: 26 April 2004 (aged 80); Canberra, Australia
- Resting place: Gungahlin Cemetery, Canberra, on 29 April 2004
- Education: University of Illinois, B.A. 1954, Ph.D. 1958; University of Chicago, M.A. 1956
- Occupation: Military historian
- Known for: Napoleon's Greatest Adversaries: Archduke Charles and the Austrian Army and other books
- Title: Professor Emeritus, Purdue University
- Spouses: Eugenia (Jean) Jaeger (1952–1967 div.); Ruth (Joy May) Gillah Smith (1969–1992 her death); Eleanor Hancock (1995–2004 his death)
- Military career
- Allegiance: United Kingdom
- Branch: Royal Army Service Corps; Infantry; Intelligence Corps
- Service years: 1941–1946
- Rank: Sergeant
- Unit: Eighth Army (United Kingdom)
- Conflicts: World War II; North African campaign; Italian campaign; Adriatic campaign; Occupation of Austria
- Awards: Distinguished Conduct Medal; Medal of Merit

Gunther Erich Rothenberg (11 July 1923 – 26 April 2004) was an internationally known military historian, best known for his publications on the Habsburg military and Napoleonic Wars. He had a fifteen-year military career, as a British Army soldier in World War II, an Israel Defense Forces officer in the 1948 Arab–Israeli War, and in the United States Air Force during the Korean War.

== Escape from Nazi Germany and military service ==
Gunther Erich Rothenberg was born in Berlin, Germany, during the time of the Weimar Republic, as the son of Erich Abraham Rothenberg and Lotte Cohn. His family was a culturally assimilated German Jewish family. In 1937, Rothenberg moved to the Netherlands with his mother; his father later joined them. The family moved next to Britain, where Rothenberg had some schooling. In 1939, he moved to Mandatory Palestine, then under British rule. There he joined the Zionist movement and Hashomer Hatzair (The Youth Guard), a Socialist-Zionist youth movement. He retained his passion for a Jewish homeland throughout his life.

On 13 July 1941, his parents emigrated to the United States on the Villa de Madrid, an overcrowded ocean-liner that left Barcelona on 20 June. His father, Erich Joseph Rothenberg, was an importer, and both his parents spoke English, Hebrew, French, and German. Their visas, issued in Lisbon, Portugal, claimed Cuban citizenship. At the age of 57, his father registered for the fourth draft in 1942, listing his residence as New York City, and his next of kin as his wife, Lotte.

In 1941, Gunther Rothenberg volunteered for the British Army, serving in an all-Jewish unit. He was wounded in North Africa. He transferred from the Royal Army Service Corps to the Intelligence Corps and fought with the Eighth Army. He served in the Italian campaign, in the Yugoslav war of liberation and in Austria. His service continued in the occupation of Austria until 1946. He was a civilian employee of U.S. Intelligence 1946–1948. Rothenberg returned to Palestine and joined the Haganah for the 1948 Palestine war. He rose to the rank of captain in the Israel Defense Forces.

By 1948, Rothenberg's father had died and his mother, Lotte (1894–1990), had become a naturalized United States citizen. To be with her in New York City, Rothenberg journeyed to Canada, arriving in Halifax, Nova Scotia; traveling from there to Toronto, he lived for a while at Wycliffe College, where he worked briefly as a construction laborer. On 19 November 1948, he crossed the international border into the United States at Buffalo, with $12.00 in his pocket. In 1951, he volunteered for the United States Army, transferred to the Air Force, and served in the Korean War. He left the Air Force in 1955. He remained guided by a deep sense of duty and a strong sense of American patriotism throughout his life.

== Education and career ==
After military service in the United States Air Force, he graduated from the University of Illinois with an undergraduate degree. Two years later, he had a master's degree from the University of Chicago. In 1959 he finished his doctoral degree at the University of Illinois at Urbana-Champaign. He retired from Purdue University, was appointed Professor Emeritus, and lived in Canberra, Australia, where he continued to write about the Napoleonic Wars.

He wrote several ground-breaking books on the organization of the Habsburg military and the military reforms of Archduke Charles in the first decade of the Napoleonic Wars. His last book, The Emperor's Last Victory, about the Battle of Wagram in 1809, was published posthumously. Although he had never finished high school, with the help of the GI Bill, Rothenberg completed a bachelor's degree from the University of Illinois in 1954. He attended graduate school at the University of Chicago, where he was recognized as an argumentative, sometimes abrasive, graduate student with a keen mind. As a graduate student, Rothenberg reviewed W.E.D. Allen's Caucasian Battlefields: A History of the Wars on the Turco-Caucasian Border, 1828–1921 (Cambridge University Press, 1953) for Journal of Modern History, He wrote his 1956 masters' thesis entitled General Crook and the Apaches, 1871–1874: the campaign in the Tonto Basin. Rothenberg received his doctorate from the University of Illinois: his 1959 dissertation, Antemurales Christianitatis: then military border in Croatia, 1522–1749, was published in 1960 by the University of Chicago Press, as The Military Border in Croatia, 1522–1749; he followed this with a second study, The Military Border in Croatia, 1750–1888: a study of an imperial institution in 1966, also published by University of Chicago Press. Both volumes were translated into German in 1970.

In part-time temporary teaching positions in Illinois and four years at the Southern Illinois University, Rothenberg taught European and world history, and published an instructor's manual on history of the world, with Henry C. Boren. In 1962, Rothenberg joined the faculty of the University of New Mexico; over the following ten years, he rose to the position of full professor. In 1962–63, he was the recipient of a Guggenheim Fellowship. In 1972, he accepted a position at Purdue University. There, he taught courses in military and European history. As a teacher, his popular course on World War II attracted more than 250 undergraduates annually.

In the 1970s, Rothenberg also established himself as an international Napoleonic scholar with The Art of Warfare in the Age of Napoleon, published in 1977. He also mentored hundreds of graduate and doctoral students. He regularly published in such peer-reviewed publications as Journal of Military History and served on the editorial board of War in History. In 1985, Rothenberg was a visiting Fulbright fellow in the Department of History in the Faculty of Military Studies at the Australian Royal Military College, Duntroon. He retired from Purdue in 1999 and was named Professor Emeritus.

From 1995 to 2001, Rothenberg was a visiting fellow at the School of Historical Studies, Monash University. After his retirement, he moved to Melbourne, Australia, and then to Canberra, where his third wife, Eleanor Hancock, taught at the Australian Defence Force Academy. Although retired, he continued to teach, lecture, and publish reviews. He also wrote two more books.

Life in Australia did not always please him; he missed both his colleagues in North America and his Purdue students. His politics—he "was anything but politically correct"—did not mesh well with Australia's leftist atmosphere. He wrote indignantly to a friend in the United States that he regretted moving to Australia when the authorities confiscated his muzzle loaders, which were prohibited "Down Under."

In 2004, he returned to the United States to present the keynote address at the 34th Annual Conference of the Consortium on Revolutionary Europe. He had recently completed The Emperor's Last Victory: Napoleon and the Battle of Wagram, which was published posthumously in November 2004. He died at the age of 80.

== Legacy ==
Rothenberg's historiographical contribution to understanding the Revolutionary era has been noted by many scholars. For many years, his Army of Francis Joseph (1976) was the standard and the only English language analysis of the Habsburg Army in the French Revolutionary and the Napoleonic wars. Rothenberg's scholarly integrity has also been noted. After publishing a critique of a publication, the author contacted him, and proved the critique unjust; Rothenberg immediately wrote to a review retracting the criticism, and the two scholars remained friends for the remainder of his life.

His colleagues or friends considered Rothenberg "the greatest scholar of the Napoleonic era of our day."

High Point University conducts the Gunther E. Rothenberg Seminar in Military History.

== Personal life and family ==
His first marriage in 1952 ended in a 1967 divorce. In 1969, Rothenberg married Ruth Gillah Smith, a widow with three daughters (Judith Goris, Laura Allman, Georgia Jones (all born Herron)), whom he helped to raise; she died in 1992. In 1995, he married for a third time, to Eleanor Hancock, a lecturer at Monash University in Australia. She is now a senior lecturer in history at the Australian Defence Force Academy at the University of New South Wales, and has written the first biography of Ernst Julius Röhm. Her 1988 doctoral thesis, National Socialist Leadership And Total War, 1941–45 for the Australia National University was published by St. Martin's Press in 1992.

== Publications ==
Rothenberg published hundreds of journal articles, reviews, and lectures. This is a partial list.

=== Books ===
- Rothenberg, Gunther Erich (1960). The Austrian Military Border in Croatia, 1522–1747. Urbana, IL: University of Illinois Press. LCCN 60015931.
- Rothenberg, Gunther Erich (1966). The Austrian Military Border in Croatia, 1740–1881; a Study of an Imperial Institution. Chicago: University of Chicago Press. ISBN 9780226729442. LCCN 66013887.
- Rothenberg, Gunther Erich (1976). The army of Francis Joseph. West Lafayette, Indiana: Purdue University Press. ISBN 0911198415. LCCN 75016051.
- Rothenberg, Gunther Erich (1979). The anatomy of the Israeli army. London: B. T. Batsford. ISBN 0713419660. LCCN 79321715.
- Rothenberg, Gunther Erich (1982). Napoleon's Great Adversaries: the Archduke Charles and the Austrian Army, 1792–1814. Bloomington: Indiana University Press. ISBN 0253339693. LCCN 82047512. (Subsequent editions titled Napoleon's Great Adversary: the Archduke Charles and the Austrian Army.)
- Rothenberg, Gunther Erich (1978). The Art of Warfare in the Age of Napoleon. Bloomington: Indiana University Press. ISBN 0-253-31076-8. LCCN 77086495.
- Rothenberg, Gunther Erich (2000). Keegan, John (ed.). The Napoleonic Wars. London: Cassell. ISBN 0304352675. LCCN 2001347125.
- Rothenberg, Gunther Erich (2004). The Emperor's Last Victory: Napoleon and the Battle of Wagram. London: Weidenfeld & Nicolson. ISBN 0297846728. LCCN 2005440770.
- Király, Béla Kalman; Rothenberg, Gunther E., eds. (1979). Special topics and generalizations on the 18th and 19th centuries. New York: Brooklyn College Press. ISBN 0930888049. LCCN 79051780. Distributed by Columbia University Press
- Rothenberg, Gunther E.; Király, Béla K.; Sugar, Peter F., eds. (1982). East Central European society and war in the prerevolutionary eighteenth century. New York: Boulder Social Science Monographs. ISBN 0930888197. LCCN 81050886. Distributed by Columbia University Press

=== Journal articles ===
- Rothenberg, Gunther E. (June 1960). "The Origins of the Austrian Military Frontier in Croatia and the Alleged Treaty of 22 December 1522". The Slavonic and East European Review. 38 (91). Modern Humanities Research Association: 493–8. JSTOR 4205180.
- Rothenberg, Gunther E. (1961). "Venice and the Uskoks of Senj: 1537–1618". The Journal of Modern History. 33 (2): 148–56. doi:10.1086/238780. S2CID 144221514.
- Rothenberg, Gunther E. (1963). "Aventinus and the Defense of the Empire Against the Turks". Studies in the Renaissance. 10: 60–7. doi:10.2307/2857048. JSTOR 2857048.
- Rothenberg, Gunther E. (1964). "The Croatian Military Border and the Rise of Yugoslav Nationalism". The Slavonic and East European Review. 43 (100): 34–45.
- Rothenberg, Gunther E. (1964). "The Struggle Over the Dissolution of the Croatian Military Border, 1850–1871". Slavic Review. 23 (1): 63–78. doi:10.2307/2492376. JSTOR 2492376. S2CID 159876996.
- Rothenberg, Gunther E. (1968). "The Austrian Army in the Age of Metternich". The Journal of Modern History. 40 (2): 155–65. doi:10.1086/240187. S2CID 143628536.
- Rothenberg, Gunther E. (1972). "Toward a National Hungarian Army: The Military Compromise of 1868 and its Consequences". Slavic Review. 31 (4): 805–16. doi:10.2307/2493764. JSTOR 2493764.
- Rothenberg, Gunther E. (1973). "The Austrian Sanitary Cordon and the Control of the Bubonic Plague: 1710–1871". Journal of the History of Medicine and Allied Sciences. 28 (1): 15–23. doi:10.1093/jhmas/XXVIII.1.15. PMID 4568378.
- Rothenberg, Gunther E. (1973). "The Habsburg Army in the Napoleonic Wars". Military Affairs. 37 (1): 1–5. doi:10.2307/1986561. JSTOR 1986561.
- Rothenberg, Gunther E. (1976). "Nobility and Military Careers: The Habsburg Officer Corps, 1740-1914". Military Affairs. 40 (4): 182–6. doi:10.2307/1986702. JSTOR 1986702.
- Rothenberg, Gunther E. (1988). "The Origins, Causes, and Extension of the Wars of the French Revolution and Napoleon". Journal of Interdisciplinary History. 18 (4): 771–93. doi:10.2307/204824. JSTOR 204824.
- Rothenberg, Gunther E. (1989). "The Austro-Hungarian Campaign Against Serbia in 1914". Journal of Military History. 53 (2): 127–46. doi:10.2307/1985745. JSTOR 1985745.
