= Podophyllotoxin hybrid molecule =

A podophyllotoxin hybrid is a molecule that obtained by combination of podophyllotoxin with other active pharmacophore that is ether designed to interact with multiple target, improve the biological properties or enhance the efficacy of target molecule. Since podophyllotoxin has an extensive pharmacological properties, this compound has been studied in term seeking for potential novel therapeutics. Molecule hybridization is a recent strategy in medicinal area to overcome the pharmacokinetic issues, toxicity, lowering side effects of drugs also reduce the potential resistance in cancer cells. Research development in podophyllotoxin hybrid is mainly focused on anti-cancer properties.

== Chemistry ==
=== Structures ===
The structure of podophyllotoxin hybrid could be classified by two major categories:

1. Hybridization of podophyllotoxin fragment with another anti-cancer pharmacophore with or without linker
2. Incorporation of podophyllotoxin with other anti-cancer pharmacophore by 1,2,3-triazole group as a linker.

=== Synthesis ===
In general, podophyllotoxin linked 1,2,3-triazole moieties is synthesized via click chemistry methods. These hybrid compounds is either prepared by reacted podophyllotoxin-azide with alkyne derivatives of the pharmacophore or podophyllotoxin-alkyn derivatives with azide derivative from other pharmacophore. This strategy has advantages in term of the high reaction yield and fast reaction rate.

== Pharmacological properties ==
Numerous podophyllotoxin hybrids were developed in purpose to design novel anti-cancer compounds. In example, podophyllotoxin-chalcone hybrid showed significant inhibition against liver cancer cell (HepG2), human gastric cancer cell (MKN-45), and murine tumor cell (B16). Another podophyllotoxin-coumarin hybrids, reported have a potent cytotoxicity toward A549, HepG2, HeLa and LoVo cancer cell lines. The podophyllotoxin-ferrocene hybrid exhibited promising in vitro antiproliferative activity against MCF-7 and MDA-MB-231 breast cancer cell lines.

== Challenges and future aspects ==
In spite of the escalating research and promising results of podophyllotoxin hybrids as anti-cancer agents, the strategy designing hybrid molecule has potential limitations. The major disadvantages with compound hybridization is the large its molecular weight (i.e. >500) that could affect the bioavailability properties and lower the solubility. Another challenge is risk of off-target toxicity and unexpected target recognition.
