= George Barany =

American chemist (born 1955)

- Professor George Barany at the University of Minnesota
- Born: February 19, 1955 (age 71); Budapest, Hungary
- Education: Rockefeller University (Ph.D., 1977; Postdoctoral Fellow)
- Known for: Peptide chemistry; Organosulfur chemistry; Orthogonal protection
- Awards: Searle Scholar Award (1982); USPHS Research Career Development Award (1982); Vincent du Vigneaud Award (1994); ACS Ralph F. Hirschmann Award in Peptide Chemistry (2006); Murray Goodman Scientific Excellence & Mentorship Award (2015); Fellow of the National Academy of Inventors (2020)
- Scientific career
- Fields: Chemistry
- Workplaces: University of Minnesota
- Doctoral advisor: R. Bruce Merrifield

George Barany (born February 19, 1955) is an American chemist whose research has focused on peptide chemistry and the chemistry of organosulfur compounds. As of 2026, he is Distinguished McKnight University Professor Emeritus at the University of Minnesota.

== Biography ==
Barany was born in Hungary in 1955 and moved to the United States in 1960. His parents, Kate and Michael Bárány, were Holocaust survivors and prominent scientists whose research focused on muscle biochemistry, biophysics, and physiology, and who endowed the Michael and Kate Bárány Award for Young Investigators given annually by the Biophysical Society. After graduating from Stuyvesant High School in New York City at age 16, he bypassed undergraduate studies to directly enter the biochemistry doctoral program at the Rockefeller University. Barany completed his doctorate in 1977 at Rockefeller University working with R. Bruce Merrifield and stayed there as a postdoctoral researcher until 1980. He joined the University of Minnesota as an assistant professor in 1980. He was promoted to associate professor in 1986, reached full Professor of Chemistry in 1991, received a joint appointment as Professor of Laboratory Medicine and Pathology in 1996, and joined the graduate faculty in Biochemistry, Molecular Biology and Biophysics in 1997. He was named a Distinguished McKnight University Professor in 1997—becoming the first Department of Chemistry faculty member to hold that honor—and became Distinguished McKnight University Professor Emeritus in 2024.

Barany shared an office in Merrifield's laboratory with Svetlana Mojsov for nearly ten years and has been her friend and colleague for more than fifty years. Barany championed Mojsov's role in the discovery of GLP-1, helping to correct the record of her GLP-1 research through a peer-reviewed account and participation in a podcast highlighting her struggles for proper recognition.

== Introduction of "orthogonal" into the chemical vocabulary ==
The now widely used term "orthogonal" was first introduced into the chemical vocabulary in 1977 by George Barany and R. Bruce Merrifield in a paper describing a new amino protecting group (Dts), with "orthogonal" being defined as “a set of completely independent classes of protecting groups… [where]… each class of groups can be removed in any order and in the presence of all other classes”. In 2003 Carolyn R. Bertozzi coined the term bioorthogonal to refer to chemical reactions that can occur within living systems without interfering with native biochemical processes.

== Research ==
Barany's research focuses on peptide synthesis using solid-phase synthesis methods, protecting groups for organic functional groups, the chemistry of thiols, disulfides, and polysulfides, as well as the biochemistry of garlic. His scientific career has produced nearly 400 scientific publications and 40 issued U.S. patents.

Barany and his team developed a series of reagents and methods that have been used in combinatorial chemistry and peptide synthesis, e.g., PAL, XAL, BAL Linkers, PEG-PS, and CLEAR supports. In nucleic acid chemistry, Barany co-developed addressable "Zipcode" DNA array technology for high-sensitivity single-nucleotide polymorphism (SNP) detection and mutational analysis, which became foundational in genomic studies and personalized medicine.

== Honors and awards ==
- Searle Scholar Award (1982)
- USPHS Research Career Development Award (1982)
- Vincent du Vigneaud Award (1994)
- ACS Ralph F. Hirschmann Award in Peptide Chemistry (2006)
- Murray Goodman Scientific Excellence & Mentorship Award (2015)
- Fellow of the National Academy of Inventors (2020)

== Personal life and extracurricular activities ==
Barany married Barbara Lou Goldenberg on March 29, 1986 at Beth Emet, The Free Synagogue, Evanston, Illinois. They have two children: Michael J. Barany, a historian of science and mathematics at the University of Edinburgh, and Deborah A. Barany, an assistant professor of kinesiology and neuroscientist at the University of Georgia.

Outside of academia, Barany is a prolific crossword puzzle constructor who has authored hundreds of puzzles since 1999 for outlets including The New York Times, Chemical & Engineering News, The Chronicle of Higher Education, and the Minneapolis Star Tribune.
