= Pretargeting (imaging) =

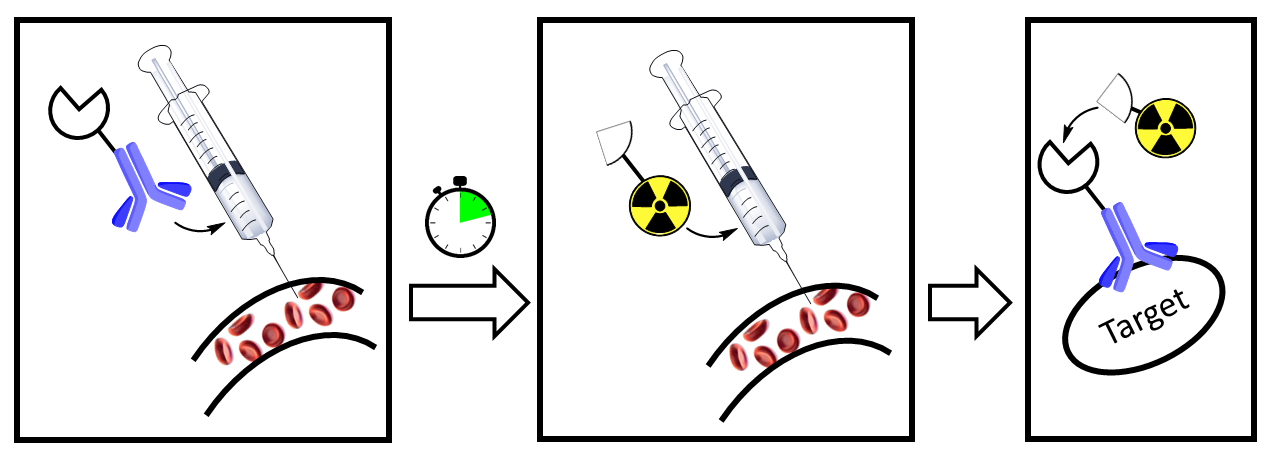
Schematic representation of a two-step pretargeting approach.

Pretargeting (imaging) is a tool for nuclear medicine and radiotherapy. Imaging studies require a high contrast of target to background. This can be provided by using a biomarker which has a high affinity and specificity for its target (e.g. an antibody).

== History ==
=== The beginning of antibody imaging ===
Owing to their high affinity and specificity, antibodies have been considered as suitable vehicles for imaging and therapeutics, since the beginning of the 20th Century.

The first radiolabelled antibodies were used in the early 1950s and got used for cancer therapy, but it took roughly two more decades before it was demonstrated that they target human tumour associated antigens in cancer patients. Due to the hybridoma technology in 1975, monoclonal (murine) antibodies could easily be produced in practical amounts, consequently the number of studies increased drastically. However, these types of antibodies turned out to be quite troublesome, due to the triggering of the human anti-murine antibody response. Consequently chimeric, humanised and human monoclonal antibodies have been created, produced and get used nowadays.

Owing to the high molecular weight of antibodies and the Fc domain of the antibody, a slow clearance from the blood and non-target tissue occurs, which results in low tumour-to-blood and tumour-to-muscle ratios. Because of this, antibodies which are going to be used for imaging purposes need to be labelled with radionuclides that have a long half-life, which increases the radiation dose to the patient. This consequently encouraged the development of lower molecular weight antibodies and resulted in the development of minibodies, diabodies, single chain variable fragments (scFv) and single domain fragments (Fv).

=== Development of pretargeted imaging ===
To bypass the problem associated with the prolonged circulation time of radiolabelled antibodies, in the mid-1980s a strategy called pretargeted radioimmunotherapy was developed. In short, this approach contained two important steps: 1. administration of a macromolecular targeting vector (usually antibody-based), and 2. a small radiolabelled molecule, which interacts with the targeting vector. Most importantly the small radiolabelled molecule gets injected after a predetermined lag period after which the macromolecule has had enough time to bind to its target and the residual unbound macromolecule to be cleared out of the system. To ensure sufficient interaction between the two components, suitable modifications with complementary species are required (like bioorthogonal modifications).

Pretargeting strategies can lead to an improved imaging contrast, as it combines the high target specificity and affinity of an antibody with the fast pharmacokinetic properties of a small molecule. The concept of pretargeting, although existing for several decades already, was limited to a few distinct classes. Developing chemical reactions that proceed quickly within living systems, without interacting with the large variety of existing functional groups, used to be an inherent difficulty. However, there have been several advancements in this area over the past few years.

== Conventional pretargeting systems ==
=== Bispecific antibodies and radiolabelled haptens ===
The beginning of the pretargeting concept was based on bispecific antibodies which were able to bind a specific target antigen and a radiolabelled hapten. Possible was this approach because of the development of monoclonal Antibodies which could be connected to radiometal chelates. Also connecting two haptens via a two amino acid linker resulted in an enhancement effect of the affinity, which improved the uptake and retention of the radiolabelled compound without affecting the rapid clearance.

Limiting factor of this approach were the slow binding constant which was rarely higher than 10^{−10} M, amongst other reasons.

=== Biotin-(strept)avidin ===
After the discovery of the fast interaction between Biotin and (Strept)Avidin, which show a high binding affinity, this approach has been used in many different ways (e.g. for protein purification purposes like the Step-tag).
