= Banert cascade =

Chemical reaction

The Banert cascade is an organic reaction in which an NH-1,2,3-triazole is prepared from a propargyl halide or sulfate and sodium azide in a dioxane- water mixture at elevated temperatures. It is named after Klaus Banert, who first reported the process in 1989. This cascade reaction is unusual because it consists of two consecutive rearrangement reactions.

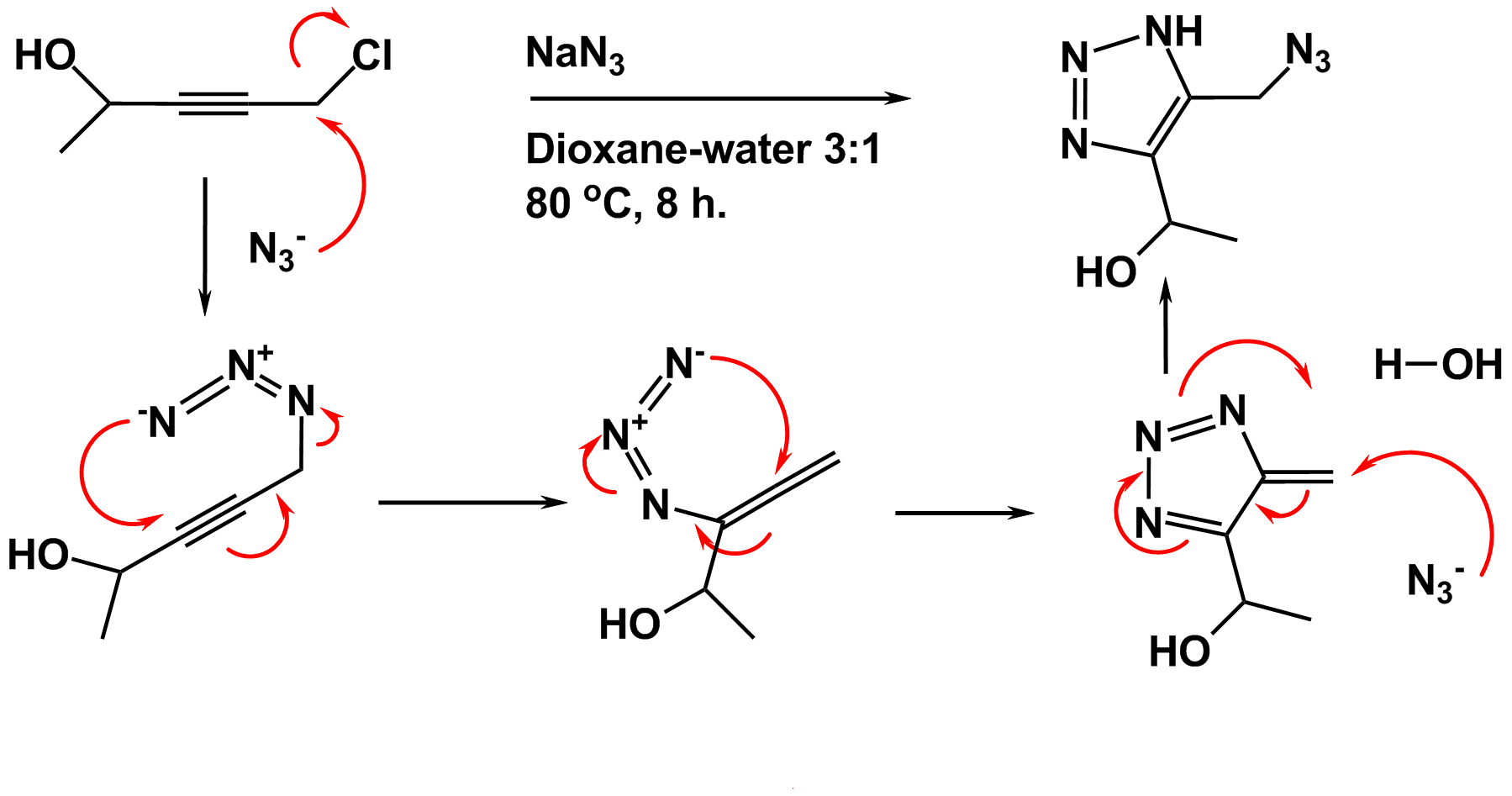
Banert cascade

The starting material is prepared from propargyl chloride and an aldehyde or ketone such as acetaldehyde. In the first step an azido compound is formed in situ in a nucleophilic displacement of chloride by the azide ion. A (3,3)Sigmatropic reaction takes place between the azide and the alkyne to the allenyl azide. This allene rearranges to the triazafulvene in a 6 pi electrocyclization. The exocyclic alkene in this intermediate is very electrophilic because the triazole group has a dipole moment of 5 debye. The reaction sequence concludes with nucleophilic attack of a second azide ion on this alkene with more double bond rearrangements and proton abstraction from a proton source.
