= Orthogonal ligand-protein pair =

Orthogonal ligand-protein pairs (also known as re-engineered ligand-receptor interfaces or re-engineered enzyme-substrate interactions) are a protein-ligand binding pair made to be independent of the original binding pair. This is done by taking a mutant protein (naturally occurring or selectively engineered), which is activated by a different ligand (carefully synthesized or selected). The intention here is that the orthogonal ligand will not interact with the original protein. The original protein will also be designed to not interact with the orthogonal ligand in certain cases.

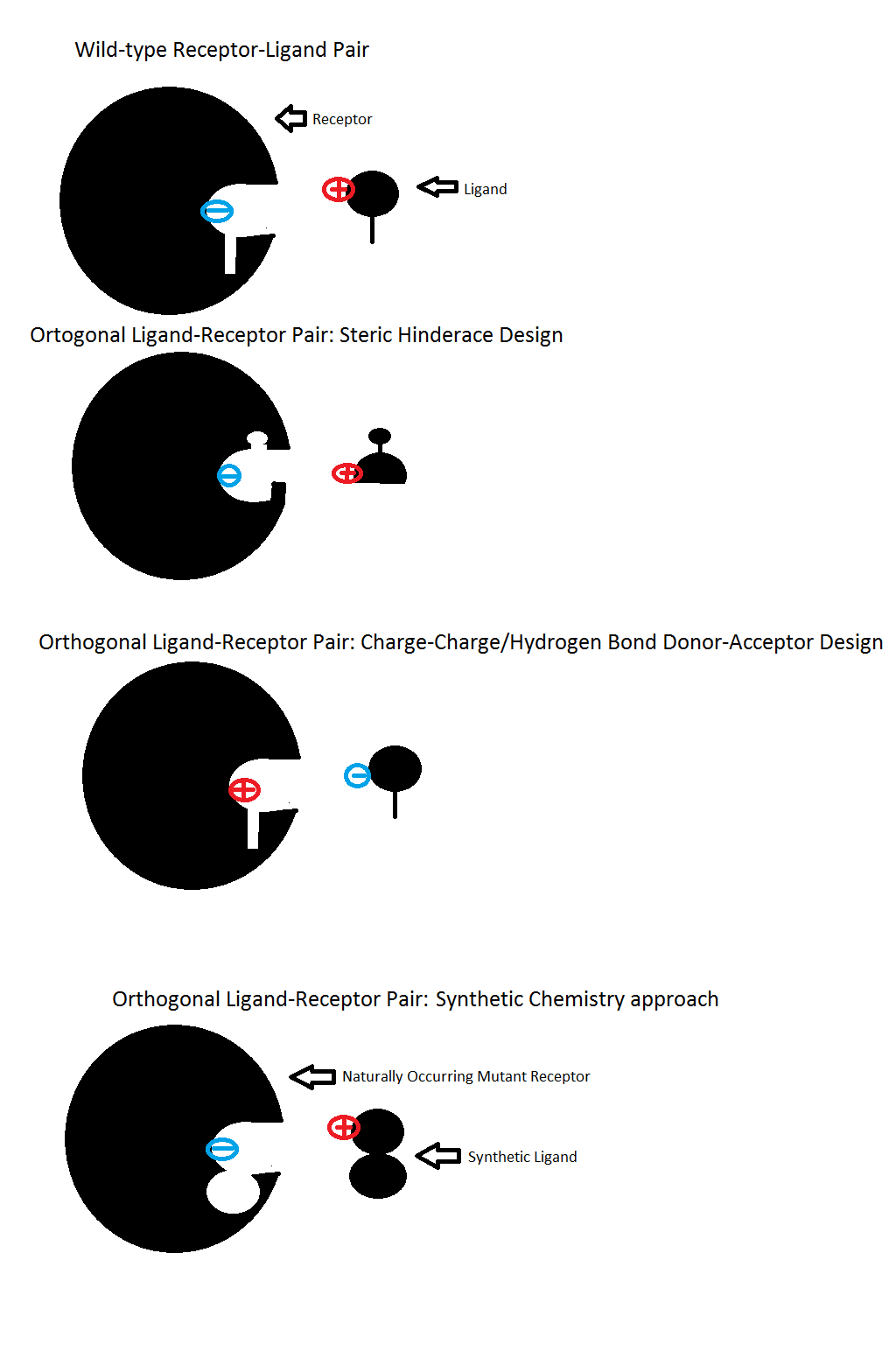

An example of orthogonal ligand-receptor interfaces are RASSL and DREADD. They are G protein-coupled receptors that are activated by synthesized ligands that wouldn't normally exist in the cell, such as the anti-psychotic Clozapine, allowing researchers to control the interaction externally and independent of internal activation.

== Approaches and designs ==
=== Protein engineering approach ===
The protein engineering approach involves synthesizing a new ligand and directed mutation of the protein's ligand-binding site. In this approach one has to be careful to only change the ligand specificity without changing the other actions of the protein.

==== Steric modification ====
The steric modification design can be summarized into 3 changes to the ligand-protein pair:

1. Altering the protein in question's ligand binding site to produce an orthogonal protein with a larger pocket to accommodate a bulky side chain
2. Further modification of the orthogonal protein so the wild-type's ligand clashes with the bulky side chain when attempting to bind
3. Adding a bulky amino acid to one side of the ligand so it is stericly hindered from binding to the wild-type protein, and removing a group from the other side of the modified ligand to stop it from clashing with the further engineered orthogonal protein's bulky side chain

==== Reversal of hydrogen bonds or charge-charge interactions ====
Another way to design an orthogonal protein is to switch the position of the hydrogen bond acceptors and donors. For example, if the ligand is a hydrogen bond donor and the protein a hydrogen bond acceptor, switch the ligand to the hydrogen bond acceptor and the protein to the donor. The reversal of charged interactions is similar, but it involves switching the position of the positive charge and the negative charge on the protein and ligand.

=== Synthetic chemistry approach ===
The synthetic chemist's approach is to take an already existing mutant form of the protein that binds the original ligand weakly, and synthesize a new ligand for which the mutant protein has a strong affinity. The drawback of this approach is the protein still interacts weakly with the natural ligand at low synthetic ligand concentrations.

== Confirmed applications ==
=== Agriculture ===
==== Induced drought resistance ====
Park et al. created an orthogonal receptor-ligand interface between PYR1 and mandipropamid. PYR1 normally binds to abscisic acid which together then bind and inactivate to PP2C as a drought stress response, which stops PP2C from deactivating SnRK2. This causes a cascade that leads to the activation of the slow anion channel 1 and closing of the leaf guard cells and stomata. The result is less water loss by the plant. The natural response by the plant using abscisic acid to bind PYR1 in drought conditions is not strong enough and is activated too late to significantly hinder crop yield loss. Abscisic acid is also currently too expensive to synthesize to be used as a spray to control drought response artificially on a mass scale. The ability to control this externally by spraying the PYR1^{MANDI} (orthogonal receptor) with mandipropamid (orthogonal ligand and fungicide) has the potential to reduce crop yield loss during droughts in plants with these engineered receptors, and has been confirmed to work in canola.

=== Medicine ===
==== Hormonal pathway control ====
Designing ligands for mutant receptors that are unresponsive to the natural ligand could prove to be an effective way to treat disease. TRβ histidine 435 is a T3 insensitive mutant that plays a role in human pituitary cancer and RTH. Hassan and Koh showed QH2 (orthogonal ligand) was able to allosterically activate the mutant TRβ nuclear hormone receptors that had lost their responsiveness to endogenous T3 (natural mutants) but retained their DNA binding activity.

=== Research ===
==== Gene expression ====
Mixing and matching the ligand-binding domains and DNA-binding domains of different hormone receptors can be used as an inducible expression mechanism to study the action of any gene with a hormone response element in its promoter. Selectively altering the ligand-binding domain to make it orthogonal to the natural ligand-receptor interface, as well as the making the DNA-binding domain and hormone response element orthogonal, would give a researcher precise control of a gene's transcription in order to study a gene's action.

==== Signal transduction ====
Studying signal transduction pathways and attempting to identify the action of proteins involved in these pathways is difficult due to the abundance and complexity of interactions, families of proteins with the same or similar action, and the relative a lack of selectivity for substrates (a good example of which are protein kinases). A method has been developed to use a radioactively labeled ATP orthogonal analog with an orthogonal kinase that uses the ATP analog to phosphorylate its substrates, allowing for identification of its targets within the pathway by the radioactive label that it will add the target. Variations on this approach can be used to identify the function of signal transduction proteins whose function remains undetermined.
