= Copper-free click chemistry =

Type of chemical reaction

Copper-free click chemistry is a bioorthogonal reaction as a variant of an azide-alkyne Huisgen cycloaddition. By eliminating cytotoxic copper catalysts, the reaction proceeds without live-cell toxicity. It was developed as a faster alternative to the Staudinger ligation with the first generation of Cu-free click chemistry, producing rate constants over 63 times faster.

Although the reaction produces a regioisomeric mixture of triazoles, the lack of regioselectivity in the reaction is not a major concern for its applications in bioorthogonal chemistry. More regiospecific and less bioorthogonal requirements are best served by the traditional Huisgen cycloaddition, especially given the low yield and synthetic difficulty of synthesizing a strained cyclooctyne (compared to the addition of a terminal alkyne).

The bioorthogonality of the reaction has allowed the Cu-free click reaction to be applied within cultured cells, live zebrafish, and mice.

The absence of exogenous metal catalysts makes the Cu-free chemical reactions suitable for the in vivo applications of bioorthogonal chemistry or bioorthogonal click chemistry.

== Development of cyclooctynes ==
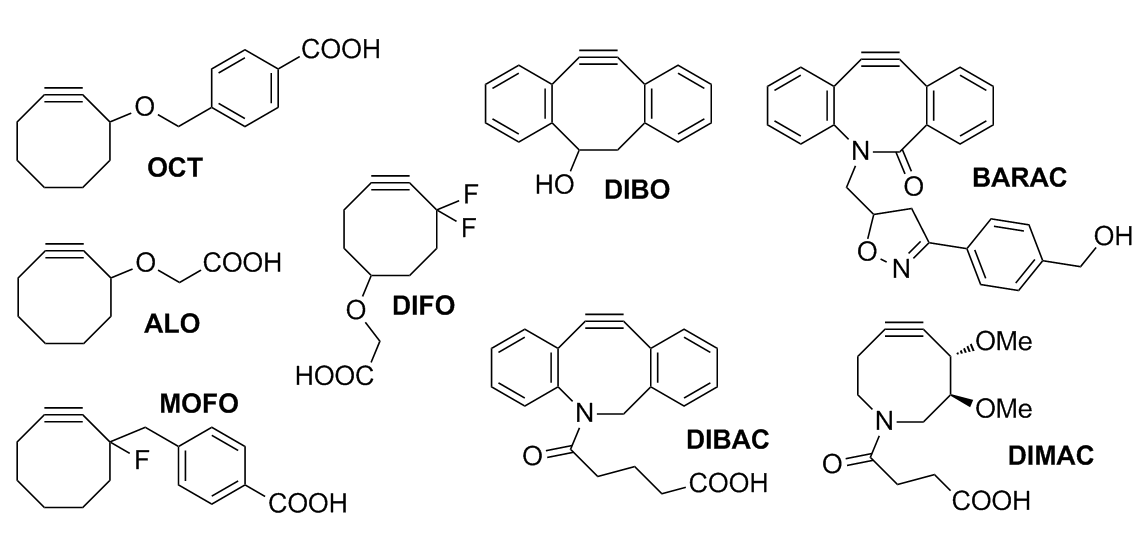
Cylooctanes used in copper-free click chemistry

=== Fluorinated cyclooctynes ===
The cyclooctane derivative OCT was the first one developed for Cu-free click chemistry; it had only ring strain to drive the reaction forward, and the kinetics were barely improved over the Staudinger ligation. After OCT and MOFO (monofluorinated cyclooctyne), the difluorinated cyclooctyne (DIFO) was developed. An improved synthetic approach to a monofluorosubstituted cyclooctyne (MFCO) was introduced that could easily be converted to a useful reactive intermediate for bioconjugation applications, although the reactivity was somewhat slower than DIFO. The MFCO demonstrated excellent stability characteristics for long-term storage.

The substituted cyclooctyne is activated for a 1,3-dipolar cycloaddition by its ring strain and electron-withdrawing fluorine substituents, which allows the reaction to take place with kinetics comparable to the Cu-catalyzed Huisgen cycloaddition. Ring strain (~18 kcal/mol) arises from the deviation of the bond angles from the ideal 180° to form an eight-membered ring, the smallest of all cycloalkynes. The electron-withdrawing fluorine substituents were chosen due to their synthetic ease and compatibility with living biological systems. Additionally, the group cannot produce cross-reacting Michael acceptors that could act as alkylating agents toward nucleophilic species within cells.

Like most cyclooctynes, DIFO prefers the chair conformation in both the ground state and the minimum energy traction path, although boat transition states may also be involved. Gas phase regioselectivity is calculated to favor 1,5 addition over 1,4 addition by up to 2.9 kcal/mol in activation energy in the gas phase; solvation corrections give the same energy barriers for both regioisomers, explaining the regioisomeric mix that results from DIFO cycloadditions. While the 1,4 isomer is disfavored by its larger dipole moment (all electron-rich substituents on one side), solvation stabilizes it more strongly than the 1,5 isomer, eroding regioselectivity. Experimental studies by Carolyn R. Bertozzi report a nearly 1:1 ratio of regioisomers, confirming the predicted lack of regioselectivity in the addition.

Furthermore, nearly all of the distortion energy (92%) arises from the distortion of the 1,3 dipole rather than the cyclooctyne, which has a pre-distorted ground state geometry that increases its reactivity. Fluorination decreases the distortion energy by allowing the transition state to be achieved with a lesser distortion of the 1,3-dipole during a reaction, resulting in a larger dipole angle.

=== Aryl cyclooctynes ===
Fusion of a cyclooctyne to two aryl rings increases the reaction rate, and the cyclooctyne reagents of the Bertozzi group proceeded through a series of fusions that sought to increase the ring strain even further. DIBO (dibenzo cyclooctyne) was developed as a precursor to BARAC (biarylazacyclooctynone), although calculations had predicted that a single fused aryl ring would be optimal. Attempts to make a difluoro benzo cyclooctyne (DIFBO) were unsuccessful due to the instability of the compound.

The reason for the instability of DIFBO is that it is so reactive that it spontaneously trimerizes to form two asymmetric products that can be characterized by X-ray crystallography. To stabilize the DIFBO, it is trapped by forming a stable inclusion complex with β-cyclodextrin in aqueous media. This complex, formed with the β-cyclodextrin, can then be stored as a lyophilized powder. To obtain the free DIFBO, the lyophilized powder is dissociated with organic solvents to produce the free DIFBO for in situ kinetic and spectroscopic analysis.

Problems with DIFO with in vivo mouse studies illustrate the difficulty of producing bioorthogonal reactions.
