= 1,2,3-Triazole =

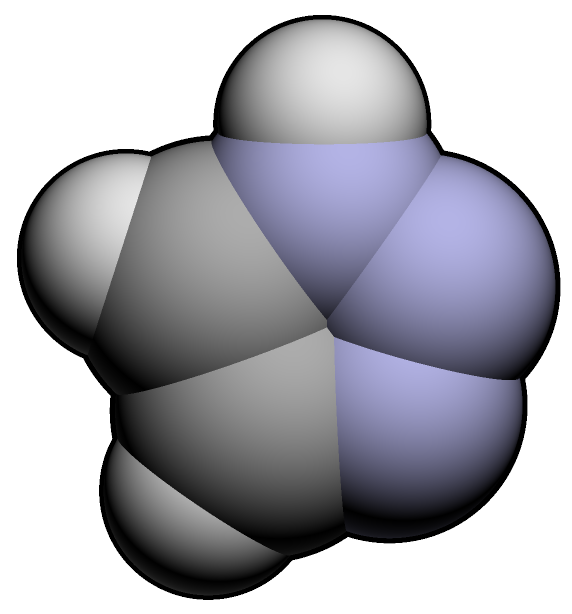

Names
- Preferred IUPAC name 1H-1,2,3-Triazole
- Other names 1,2,3-Triazole

Identifiers
CAS Number	288-36-8
3D model (JSmol)	Interactive image; Interactive image
ChEBI	CHEBI:35566
ChemSpider	60839
ECHA InfoCard	100.128.405
EC Number	608-262-3
PubChem CID	67516
UNII	EM7554254W
CompTox Dashboard (EPA)	DTXSID30870495
- InChI: InChI=1S/C2H3N3/c1-2-4-5-3-1/h1-2H,(H,3,4,5) Key: QWENRTYMTSOGBR-UHFFFAOYSA-N; InChI=1/C2H3N3/c1-2-4-5-3-1/h1-2H,(H,3,4,5) Key: QWENRTYMTSOGBR-UHFFFAOYAF
- SMILES: C1=CN=NN1; c1cnn[nH]1

Properties
Chemical formula	C_{2}H_{3}N_{3}
Molar mass	69.0654
Appearance	colorless liquid
Density	1.192
Melting point	23 to 25 °C (73 to 77 °F; 296 to 298 K)
Boiling point	203 °C (397 °F; 476 K)
Solubility in water	very soluble
Acidity (pK_{a})	9.4
Basicity (pK_{b})	1.2

Hazards
- GHS labelling
Pictograms	(GHS07: Exclamation mark)
Signal word	Warning
Hazard statements	H315, H319, H335
Precautionary statements	P261, P264, P271, P280, P302+P352, P304+P340, P305+P351+P338, P312, P321, P332+P313, P337+P313, P362, P403+P233, P405, P501

Related compounds
Related compounds	1,2,4-triazole imidazole
- Except where otherwise noted, data are given for materials in their standard state (at 25 °C [77 °F], 100 kPa). verify (what is ?) Infobox references

1,2,3-Triazole is one of a pair of isomeric chemical compounds with molecular formula C_{2}H_{3}N_{3}, called triazoles, which have a five-membered ring of two carbon atoms and three nitrogen atoms. 1,2,3-Triazole is a basic aromatic heterocycle.

== Synthesis ==
The unsubstituted ring can be produced by an oxidative coupling of glyoxal, hydrazine and sodium nitrite.

A wide range of methods exist for forming substituted 1,2,3-triazoles. These include the Banert cascade or the azide alkyne Huisgen cycloaddition in which an azide and an alkyne undergo a 1,3-dipolar cycloaddition reaction. Under thermal conditions, regioselectivity is substrate dependent. Selectivity can be increased with metal catalysts, which have the added benefit of reacting without excessive or extensive heating. Copper catalyzed cycloadditions favor 1,4-disubstituted triazoles, Ruthenium catalyzed cycloaddition favor 1,5-disubstituted triazoles. This chemistry was expanded by Zhu et al. in 2018 wherein they report a two-step sequence from a terminal alkyne to 4-cyano 1,5-disubstituted triazoles.

== Properties ==
The 2H-1,2,3-triazole tautomer is the major form in aqueous solution. It is a surprisingly stable structure compared to other organic compounds with three adjacent nitrogen atoms. However, flash vacuum pyrolysis at 500 °C leads to loss of molecular nitrogen (N_{2}) leaving a three-member aziridine ring. Certain triazoles are relatively easy to cleave due to ring–chain tautomerism. One manifestation is found in the Dimroth rearrangement.

== Applications ==
1,2,3-Triazole finds use in research as a bioisostere for imidazoles and various carboxylic acid derivatives in medicinal chemistry. Consequently it is an industrial building block for more complex chemicals, including pharmaceutical drugs such as mubritinib and tazobactam.
