= Oxanorbornadiene =

Names
- Preferred IUPAC name 7-Oxabicyclo[2.2.1]hepta-2,5-diene

Identifiers
CAS Number	6569-83-1
3D model (JSmol)	Interactive image
ChemSpider	29361914
PubChem CID	1512660
CompTox Dashboard (EPA)	DTXSID90363757
- InChI: InChI=1S/C6H6O/c1-2-6-4-3-5(1)7-6/h1-6H/t5-,6+ Key: YKCNBNDWSATCJL-OLQVQODUSA-N; InChI=1/C6H6O/c1-2-6-4-3-5(1)7-6/h1-6H/t5-,6+ Key: YKCNBNDWSATCJL-OLQVQODUBQ
- SMILES: C1=CC2C=CC1O2

Properties
Chemical formula	C_{6}H_{6}O
Molar mass	94.113 g·mol^{−1}
Appearance	colorless liquid
Boiling point	129 °C (264 °F; 402 K)
- Except where otherwise noted, data are given for materials in their standard state (at 25 °C [77 °F], 100 kPa). Infobox references

Oxanorbornadiene (OND) is a bicyclic organic compound with an oxygen atom bridging the two opposing saturated carbons of 1,4-cyclohexadiene. OND is related to all-carbon bicycle norbornadiene.

== Synthesis ==
OND can be prepared by cycloaddition of furan to cis-1,2-bis(phenylsulfonyl)ethylene followed by removal of the phenylsulfonyl groups.

Useful OND derivatives are dialkyl OND-2,3-dicarboxylates, readily obtainable by a Diels–Alder cycloaddition between furans and acetylenedicarboxylates such as DMAD.

Diels–Alder synthesis of OND dicarboxylates

== Properties ==
OND-2,3-dicarboxylates (thereafter referred to as OND) display unusually high reactivity towards organic azides and thiols. OND–thiol adducts are prone to retro-Diels–Alder fragmentation, which occurs with widely variable rates.

== Reactions with azides ==
ONDs react with organic azides to yield a mixture of four products, arising from initial 1,3-dipolar cycloaddition onto either of the two olefins, followed by a retro-Diels–Alder reaction (a cycloelimination reaction) to form 1,2,3-triazoles and furans. The intermediate triazolines avoid detection because of a very strong thermodynamic drive to collapse into two aromatic products. The relative preference of attack on either double bond is governed by the electronic nature of the azides. Electron-rich aliphatic azides, e.g. benzyl azide, react preferentially via their HOMO orbital. Interaction of the azide HOMO with LUMO orbital of the OND, localized on the electron-poor C-2 and C-3, leads the products consistent with path A. Electron-poor aryl azides, such as p-nitrophenyl azide, react, to a significant extent, via their LUMO orbitals, interacting with OND HOMO (C-5 and C-6), leading to higher amounts of path B products. The dipolar reactivity of OND with azides is unusually high for olefins, and even exceeds that of parent electron-poor alkyne DMAD.

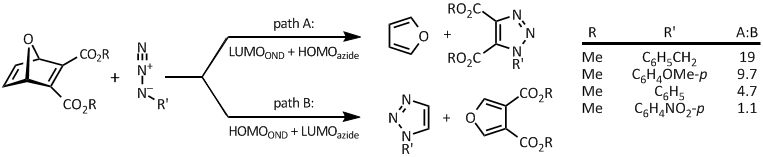
Reaction of OND with organic azides
