= Peter Sugar =

American historian

Peter Sugar (January 1919 – December 5, 1999) was an American historian, known for his expertise in the history of East Central Europe, and a frequent speaker at international conferences during the Yugoslav wars of the 1990s. Sugar was a recipient of a lifetime achievement Award for Distinguished Contributions to Slavic Studies from the American Association for the Advancement of Slavic Studies.

== Early life and education ==
Sugar was born in Budapest, Hungary, and earned a baccalaureate degree from Budapest's Lutheran Gymnasium. He played ice hockey for Hungary's national team, and was a member of the Hungarian cavalry. He relocated to Istanbul prior to the Second World War, where he learned the Turkish language and began to specialize in Southeast European studies. During the war, still in Istanbul, he worked for the United States Army in the field of counterintelligence. Sugar's service to the U.S. army made him eligible to emigrate to the United States in 1946. He studied history at the City College of New York, obtaining an additional undergraduate degree in 1954. He enrolled in a doctoral program at Princeton University, receiving his PhD in history and Near Eastern studies in 1959. His dissertation topic was "The Industrialization of Bosnia-Hercegovina, 1878-1918: The Development of a Backward Region," and was supervised by Cyril E. Black and Jerome Blum. His dissertation was later revised and published by University of Washington Press in 1963.

== Academic career ==
Sugar began a long-term career at the University of Washington in 1959, teaching European and Ottoman history. In 1987, he was chosen as instructor of the Year. He retired on March 9, 1989. The mayor of Seattle, Charles Royer, declared that date to be "Peter Sugar Day" to honor Sugar's contributions over three decades as a professor at the university.

== Selected works ==
- Southeastern Europe Under Ottoman Rule, 1354–1804. History of East Central Europe. University of Washington Press. 1983. ISBN 978-0-295-96033-3. (Bulgarian edition – 2003, ISBN 954-533-054-6)
- East European Nationalism, Politics and Religion. Ashgate Publishing. 1999. ISBN 9780860788065. (Collection of essays by Sugar)
- Industrialization of Bosnia-Hercegovina: 1878-1918. University of Washington Press. 1963. ISBN 978-0295738147.

== See also ==
- Slavistics
