= List of Nobel laureates in Chemistry =

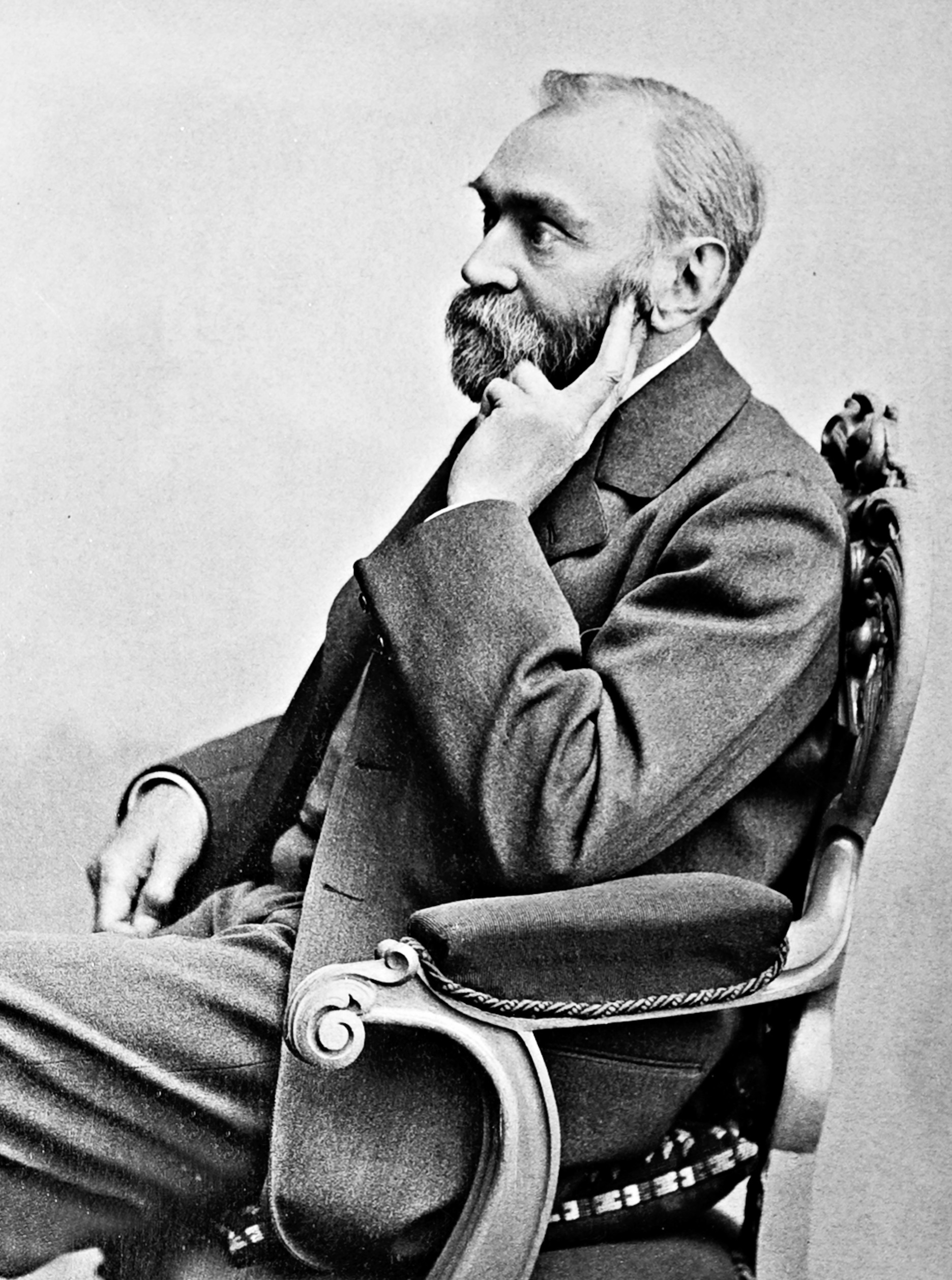
The Nobel Prize in Chemistry was established in the 1895 will of Swedish chemist Alfred Bernhard Nobel.

The Nobel Prize in Chemistry (Swedish: Nobelpriset i kemi) is awarded annually by the Royal Swedish Academy of Sciences to scientists in the various fields of chemistry. It is one of the five Nobel Prizes established by the 1895 will of Alfred Nobel, who died in 1896. These prizes are awarded for outstanding contributions in chemistry, physics, literature, peace, and physiology or medicine. As dictated by Nobel's will, the award is administered by the Nobel Foundation and awarded by the Royal Swedish Academy of Sciences. The first Nobel Prize in Chemistry was awarded in 1901 to Jacobus Henricus van 't Hoff, of the Netherlands. Each recipient receives a medal, a diploma and a monetary award prize that has varied throughout the years. In 1901, van 't Hoff received 150,782 SEK, which is equal to 7,731,004 SEK in December 2007. The award is presented in Stockholm at an annual ceremony on 10 December, the anniversary of Nobel's death.

At least 25 laureates have received the Nobel Prize for contributions in the field of organic chemistry, more than any other field of chemistry. Two Nobel Prize laureates in Chemistry, Germans Richard Kuhn (1938) and Adolf Butenandt (1939), were not allowed by their government to accept the prize. They would later receive a medal and diploma, but not the money. Frederick Sanger is one out of three laureates to be awarded the Nobel Prize twice in the same subject, for Chemistry in 1958 and 1980. John Bardeen, who was awarded the Nobel Prize in Physics in 1956 and 1972, and Karl Barry Sharpless, who won the Nobel Prize for Chemistry in 2001 and 2022, are the others. Two others have won Nobel Prizes twice, one in chemistry and one in another subject: Maria Skłodowska-Curie (physics in 1903, chemistry in 1911) and Linus Pauling (chemistry in 1954, peace in 1962). As of 2025, the prize has been awarded to 200 individuals, including eight women (Maria Skłodowska-Curie being the first to be awarded in 1911).

There have been eight years for which the Nobel Prize in Chemistry was not awarded (1916, 1917, 1919, 1924, 1933, 1940–42). There were also nine years for which the Nobel Prize in Chemistry was delayed for one year. The Prize was not awarded in 1914, as the Nobel Committee for Chemistry decided that none of that year's nominations met the necessary criteria, but was awarded to Theodore William Richards in 1915 and counted as the 1914 prize. This precedent was followed for the 1918 prize awarded to Fritz Haber in 1919, the 1920 prize awarded to Walther Nernst in 1921, the 1921 prize awarded to Frederick Soddy in 1922, the 1925 prize awarded to Richard Zsigmondy in 1926, the 1927 prize awarded to Heinrich Otto Wieland in 1928, the 1938 prize awarded to Richard Kuhn in 1939, the 1943 prize awarded to George de Hevesy in 1944, and the 1944 prize awarded to Otto Hahn in 1945.

In 2020, Ioannidis et al. reported that half of the Nobel Prizes for science awarded between 1995 and 2017 were clustered in just a few disciplines within their broader fields. Atomic physics, particle physics, cell biology, and neuroscience dominated the two subjects outside chemistry, while molecular chemistry was the chief prize-winning discipline in its domain. Molecular chemists won 5.3% of all science Nobel Prizes during this period.

== Laureates ==
Year	Name^{[A]}	Nationality^{[B]}	Citation^{[C]}
1901	Jacobus Henricus van 't Hoff (1852–1911)	Dutch	"in recognition of the extraordinary services he has rendered by the discovery of the laws of chemical dynamics and osmotic pressure in solutions"
1902	Hermann Emil Fischer (1852–1919)	German	"in recognition of the extraordinary services he has rendered by his work on sugar and purine syntheses"
1903	Svante Arrhenius (1859–1927)	Swedish	"in recognition of the extraordinary services he has rendered to the advancement of chemistry by his electrolytic theory of dissociation"
1904	William Ramsay (1852–1916)	British	"in recognition of his services in the discovery of the inert gaseous elements in air, and his determination of their place in the periodic system"
1905	Adolf von Baeyer (1835–1917)	German	"in recognition of his services in the advancement of organic chemistry and the chemical industry, through his work on organic dyes and hydroaromatic compounds"
1906	Henri Moissan (1852–1907)	French	"in recognition of the great services rendered by him in his investigation and isolation of the element fluorine, and for the adoption in the service of science of the electric furnace called after him"
1907	Eduard Buchner (1860–1917)	German	"for his biochemical researches and his discovery of cell-free fermentation"
1908	Ernest Rutherford (1871–1937)	New Zealander	"for his investigations into the disintegration of the elements, and the chemistry of radioactive substances"
1909	Wilhelm Ostwald (1853–1932)	German	"in recognition of his work on catalysis and for his investigations into the fundamental principles governing chemical equilibria and rates of reaction"
1910	Otto Wallach (1847–1931)	German	"in recognition of his services to organic chemistry and the chemical industry by his pioneer work in the field of alicyclic compounds"
1911	Marie Curie (1867–1934)	French; Polish	"in recognition of her services to the advancement of chemistry by the discovery of the elements radium and polonium, by the isolation of radium and the study of the nature and compounds of this remarkable element"
1912	Victor Grignard (1871–1935)	French	"for the discovery of the so-called Grignard reagent, which in recent years has greatly advanced the progress of organic chemistry"
1912	Paul Sabatier (1854–1941)	French	"for his method of hydrogenating organic compounds in the presence of finely disintegrated metals whereby the progress of organic chemistry has been greatly advanced in recent years"
1913	Alfred Werner (1866–1919)	Swiss	"in recognition of his work on the linkage of atoms in molecules by which he has thrown new light on earlier investigations and opened up new fields of research especially in inorganic chemistry"
1914	Theodore William Richards (1868–1928)	American	"in recognition of his accurate determinations of the atomic weight of a large number of chemical elements"
1915	Richard Willstätter (1872–1942)	German	"for his researches on plant pigments, especially chlorophyll"
1916	Not awarded		
1917	Not awarded		
1918	Fritz Haber (1868–1934)	German	"for the synthesis of ammonia from its elements"
1919	Not awarded		
1920	Walther Nernst (1864–1941)	German	"in recognition of his work in thermochemistry"
1921	Frederick Soddy (1877–1956)	British	"for his contributions to our knowledge of the chemistry of radioactive substances, and his investigations into the origin and nature of isotopes"
1922	Francis William Aston (1877–1945)	British	"for his discovery, by means of his mass spectrograph, of isotopes, in a large number of non-radioactive elements, and for his enunciation of the whole-number rule"
1923	Fritz Pregl (1869–1930)	Austrian; Yugoslavian	"for his invention of the method of micro-analysis of organic substances"
1924	Not awarded		
1925	Richard Adolf Zsigmondy (1865–1929)	Austrian	"for his demonstration of the heterogeneous nature of colloid solutions and for the methods he used"
1926	The Svedberg (1884–1971)	Swedish	"for his work on disperse systems"
1927	Heinrich Otto Wieland (1877–1957)	German	"for his investigations of the constitution of the bile acids and related substances"
1928	Adolf Windaus (1876–1959)	German	"for the services rendered through his research into the constitution of the sterols and their connection with the vitamins"
1929	Arthur Harden (1865–1940)	British	"for their investigations on the fermentation of sugar and fermentative enzymes"
1929	Hans von Euler-Chelpin (1873–1964)	German; Swedish	"for their investigations on the fermentation of sugar and fermentative enzymes"
1930	Hans Fischer (1881–1945)	German	"for his researches into the constitution of haemin and chlorophyll and especially for his synthesis of haemin"
1931	Carl Bosch (1874–1940)	German	"in recognition of their contributions to the invention and development of chemical high pressure methods"
1931	Friedrich Bergius (1884–1949)	German	"in recognition of their contributions to the invention and development of chemical high pressure methods"
1932	Irving Langmuir (1881–1957)	American	"for his discoveries and investigations in surface chemistry"
1933	Not awarded		
1934	Harold Urey (1893–1981)	American	"for his discovery of heavy hydrogen"
1935	Frédéric Joliot (1900–1958)	French	"in recognition of their synthesis of new radioactive elements"
1935	Irène Joliot-Curie (1897–1956)	French	"in recognition of their synthesis of new radioactive elements"
1936	Peter Debye (1884–1966)	Dutch	"for his contributions to our knowledge of molecular structure through his investigations on dipole moments and on the diffraction of X-rays and electrons in gases"
1937	Norman Haworth (1883–1950)	British	"for his investigations on carbohydrates and vitamin C"
1937	Paul Karrer (1889–1971)	Swiss	"for his investigations on carotenoids, flavins and vitamins A and B_{2}"
1938	Richard Kuhn (1900–1967)	German	"for his work on carotenoids and vitamins"
1939	Adolf Butenandt (1903–1995)	German	"for his work on sex hormones"
1939	Leopold Ružička (1887–1976)	Swiss; Yugoslavian	"for his work on polymethylenes and higher terpenes"
1940	Not awarded		
1941	Not awarded		
1942	Not awarded		
1943	George de Hevesy (1885–1966)	Hungarian	"for his work on the use of isotopes as tracers in the study of chemical processes"
1944	Otto Hahn (1879–1968)	German	"for his discovery of the fission of heavy nuclei"
1945	Artturi Ilmari Virtanen (1895–1973)	Finnish	"for his research and inventions in agricultural and nutrition chemistry, especially for his fodder preservation method"
1946	James B. Sumner (1887–1955)	American	"for his discovery that enzymes can be crystallized"
1946	John Howard Northrop (1891–1987)	American	"for their preparation of enzymes and virus proteins in a pure form"
1946	Wendell Meredith Stanley (1904–1971)	American	"for their preparation of enzymes and virus proteins in a pure form"
1947	Robert Robinson (1886–1975)	British	"for his investigations on plant products of biological importance, especially the alkaloids"
1948	Arne Tiselius (1902–1971)	Swedish	"for his research on electrophoresis and adsorption analysis, especially for his discoveries concerning the complex nature of the serum proteins"
1949	William Giauque (1895–1982)	American; Canadian	"for his contributions in the field of chemical thermodynamics, particularly concerning the behaviour of substances at extremely low temperatures"
1950	Otto Diels (1876–1954)	West German	"for their discovery and development of the diene synthesis"
1950	Kurt Alder (1902–1958)	West German	"for their discovery and development of the diene synthesis"
1951	Edwin McMillan (1907–1991)	American	"for their discoveries in the chemistry of transuranium elements"
1951	Glenn T. Seaborg (1912–1999)	American	"for their discoveries in the chemistry of transuranium elements"
1952	Archer Martin (1910–2002)	British	"for their invention of partition chromatography"
1952	Richard Laurence Millington Synge (1914–1994)	British	"for their invention of partition chromatography"
1953	Hermann Staudinger (1881–1965)	West German	"for his discoveries in the field of macromolecular chemistry"
1954	Linus Pauling (1901–1994)	American	"for his research into the nature of the chemical bond and its application to the elucidation of the structure of complex substances"
1955	Vincent du Vigneaud (1901–1978)	American	"for his work on biochemically important sulphur compounds, especially for the first synthesis of a polypeptide hormone"
1956	Cyril Norman Hinshelwood (1897–1967)	British	"for their researches into the mechanism of chemical reactions"
1956	Nikolay Semyonov (1896–1986)	Soviet	"for their researches into the mechanism of chemical reactions"
1957	Alexander R. Todd (1907–1997)	British	"for his work on nucleotides and nucleotide co-enzymes"
1958	Frederick Sanger (1918–2013)	British	"for his work on the structure of proteins, especially that of insulin"
1959	Jaroslav Heyrovský (1890–1967)	Czechoslovak	"for his discovery and development of the polarographic methods of analysis"
1960	Willard Libby (1908–1980)	American	"for his method to use carbon-14 for age determination in archaeology, geology, geophysics, and other branches of science"
1961	Melvin Calvin (1911–1997)	American	"for his research on the carbon dioxide assimilation in plants"
1962	Max Perutz (1914–2002)	Austrian; British	"for their studies of the structures of globular proteins"
1962	John Kendrew (1917–1997)	British	"for their studies of the structures of globular proteins"
1963	Karl Ziegler (1898–1973)	West German	"for their discoveries in the field of the chemistry and technology of high polymers"
1963	Giulio Natta (1903–1979)	Italian	"for their discoveries in the field of the chemistry and technology of high polymers"
1964	Dorothy Hodgkin (1910–1994)	British	"for her determinations by X-ray techniques of the structures of important biochemical substances"
1965	Robert Burns Woodward (1917–1979)	American	"for his outstanding achievements in the art of organic synthesis"
1966	Robert S. Mulliken (1896–1986)	American	"for his fundamental work concerning chemical bonds and the electronic structure of molecules by the molecular orbital method"
1967	Manfred Eigen (1927–2019)	West German	"for their studies of extremely fast chemical reactions, effected by disturbing the equilibrium by means of very short pulses of energy"
1967	Ronald George Wreyford Norrish (1897–1978)	British	"for their studies of extremely fast chemical reactions, effected by disturbing the equilibrium by means of very short pulses of energy"
1967	George Porter (1920–2002)	British	"for their studies of extremely fast chemical reactions, effected by disturbing the equilibrium by means of very short pulses of energy"
1968	Lars Onsager (1903–1976)	American; Norwegian	"for the discovery of the reciprocal relations bearing his name, which are fundamental for the thermodynamics of irreversible processes"
1969	Derek Barton (1918–1998)	British	"for their contributions to the development of the concept of conformation and its application in chemistry"
1969	Odd Hassel (1897–1981)	Norwegian	"for their contributions to the development of the concept of conformation and its application in chemistry"
1970	Luis Leloir (1906–1987)	Argentine	"for his discovery of sugar nucleotides and their role in the biosynthesis of carbohydrates"
1971	Gerhard Herzberg (1904–1999)	Canadian; West German	"for his contributions to the knowledge of electronic structure and geometry of molecules, particularly free radicals"
1972	Christian B. Anfinsen (1916–1995)	American	"for his work on ribonuclease, especially concerning the connection between the amino acid sequence and the biologically active conformation"
1972	Stanford Moore (1913–1982)	American	"for their contribution to the understanding of the connection between chemical structure and catalytic activity of the active centre of the ribonuclease molecule"
1972	William Stein (1911–1980)	American	"for their contribution to the understanding of the connection between chemical structure and catalytic activity of the active centre of the ribonuclease molecule"
1973	Ernst Otto Fischer (1918–2007)	West German	"for their pioneering work, performed independently, on the chemistry of the organometallic, so called sandwich compounds"
1973	Geoffrey Wilkinson (1921–1996)	British	"for their pioneering work, performed independently, on the chemistry of the organometallic, so called sandwich compounds"
1974	Paul Flory (1910–1985)	American	"for his fundamental work, both theoretical and experimental, in the physical chemistry of macromolecules"
1975	John Cornforth (1917–2013)	Australian; British	"for his work on the stereochemistry of enzyme-catalyzed reactions"
1975	Vladimir Prelog (1906–1998)	Swiss; Yugoslavian	"for his research into the stereochemistry of organic molecules and reactions"
1976	William Lipscomb (1919–2011)	American	"for his studies on the structure of boranes illuminating problems of chemical bonding"
1977	Ilya Prigogine (1917–2003)	Belgian	"for his contributions to non-equilibrium thermodynamics, particularly the theory of dissipative structures"
1978	Peter D. Mitchell (1920–1992)	British	"for his contribution to the understanding of biological energy transfer through the formulation of the chemiosmotic theory"
1979	Herbert C. Brown (1912–2004)	American	"for their development of the use of boron- and phosphorus-containing compounds, respectively, into important reagents in organic synthesis"
1979	Georg Wittig (1897–1987)	West German	"for their development of the use of boron- and phosphorus-containing compounds, respectively, into important reagents in organic synthesis"
1980	Paul Berg (1926–2023)	American	"for his fundamental studies of the biochemistry of nucleic acids, with particular regard to recombinant-DNA"
1980	Walter Gilbert (1932–present)	American	"for their contributions concerning the determination of base sequences in nucleic acids"
1980	Frederick Sanger (1918–2013)	British	"for their contributions concerning the determination of base sequences in nucleic acids"
1981	Kenichi Fukui (1918–1998)	Japanese	"for their theories, developed independently, concerning the course of chemical reactions"
1981	Roald Hoffmann (1937–present)	American; Polish	"for their theories, developed independently, concerning the course of chemical reactions"
1982	Aaron Klug (1926–2018)	British	"for his development of crystallographic electron microscopy and his structural elucidation of biologically important nucleic acid-protein complexes"
1983	Henry Taube (1915–2005)	American; Canadian	"for his work on the mechanisms of electron transfer reactions, especially in metal complexes"
1984	Robert Bruce Merrifield (1921–2006)	American	"for his development of methodology for chemical synthesis on a solid matrix"
1985	Herbert A. Hauptman (1917–2011)	American	"for their outstanding achievements in developing direct methods for the determination of crystal structures"
1985	Jerome Karle (1918–2013)	American	"for their outstanding achievements in developing direct methods for the determination of crystal structures"
1986	Dudley R. Herschbach (1932–present)	American	"for their contributions concerning the dynamics of chemical elementary processes"
1986	Yuan T. Lee (1936–present)	Taiwanese	"for their contributions concerning the dynamics of chemical elementary processes"
1986	John Polanyi (1929–present)	Canadian	"for their contributions concerning the dynamics of chemical elementary processes"
1987	Donald J. Cram (1919–2001)	American	"for their development and use of molecules with structure-specific interactions of high selectivity"
1987	Jean-Marie Lehn (1939–present)	French	"for their development and use of molecules with structure-specific interactions of high selectivity"
1987	Charles J. Pedersen (1904–1989)	American	"for their development and use of molecules with structure-specific interactions of high selectivity"
1988	Johann Deisenhofer (1943–present)	West German	"for their determination of the three-dimensional structure of a photosynthetic reaction centre"
1988	Robert Huber (1937–present)	West German	"for their determination of the three-dimensional structure of a photosynthetic reaction centre"
1988	Hartmut Michel (1948–present)	West German	"for their determination of the three-dimensional structure of a photosynthetic reaction centre"
1989	Sidney Altman (1939–2022)	American; Canadian	"for their discovery of catalytic properties of RNA"
1989	Thomas Cech (1947–present)	American	"for their discovery of catalytic properties of RNA"
1990	Elias James Corey (1928–present)	American	"for his development of the theory and methodology of organic synthesis"
1991	Richard R. Ernst (1933–2021)	Swiss	"for his contributions to the development of the methodology of high resolution nuclear magnetic resonance (NMR) spectroscopy"
1992	Rudolph A. Marcus (1923–2026)	American; Canadian	"for his contributions to the theory of electron transfer reactions in chemical systems"
1993	Kary Mullis (1944–2019)	American	"for contributions to the developments of methods within DNA-based chemistry, [especially] for his invention of the polymerase chain reaction (PCR) method"
1993	Michael Smith (1932–2000)	British; Canadian	"for contributions to the developments of methods within DNA-based chemistry, [especially] for his fundamental contributions to the establishment of oligonucleotide-based, site-directed mutagenesis and its development for protein studies"
1994	George Olah (1927–2017)	American; Hungarian	"for his contribution to carbocation chemistry"
1995	Paul J. Crutzen (1933–2021)	Dutch	"for their work in atmospheric chemistry, particularly concerning the formation and decomposition of ozone"
1995	Mario J. Molina (1943–2020)	Mexican	"for their work in atmospheric chemistry, particularly concerning the formation and decomposition of ozone"
1995	F. Sherwood Rowland (1927–2012)	American	"for their work in atmospheric chemistry, particularly concerning the formation and decomposition of ozone"
1996	Robert Curl (1933–2022)	American	"for their discovery of fullerenes"
1996	Harry Kroto (1939–2016)	British	"for their discovery of fullerenes"
1996	Richard Smalley (1943–2005)	American	"for their discovery of fullerenes"
1997	Paul D. Boyer (1918–2018)	American	"for their elucidation of the enzymatic mechanism underlying the synthesis of adenosine triphosphate (ATP)"
1997	John E. Walker (1941–present)	British	"for their elucidation of the enzymatic mechanism underlying the synthesis of adenosine triphosphate (ATP)"
1997	Jens Skou (1918–2018)	Danish	"for the first discovery of an ion-transporting enzyme, Na^{+}, K^{+} -ATPase"
1998	Walter Kohn (1923–2016)	American; Austrian	"for his development of the density-functional theory"
1998	John Pople (1925–2004)	British	"for his development of computational methods in quantum chemistry"
1999	Ahmed Zewail (1946–2016)	American; Egyptian	"for his studies of the transition states of chemical reactions using femtosecond spectroscopy"
2000	Alan J. Heeger (1936–present)	American	"for their discovery and development of conductive polymers"
2000	Alan MacDiarmid (1927–2007)	American; New Zealander	"for their discovery and development of conductive polymers"
2000	Hideki Shirakawa (1936–2026)	Japanese	"for their discovery and development of conductive polymers"
2001	William Knowles (1917–2012)	American	"for their work on chirally catalysed hydrogenation reactions"
2001	Ryōji Noyori (1938–present)	Japanese	"for their work on chirally catalysed hydrogenation reactions"
2001	Barry Sharpless (1941–present)	American	"for his work on chirally catalysed oxidation reactions"
2002	John Fenn (1917–2010)	American	"for the development of methods for identification and structure analyses of biological macromolecules, [especially] for their development of soft desorption ionisation methods for mass spectrometric analyses of biological macromolecules"
2002	Koichi Tanaka (1959–present)	Japanese	"for the development of methods for identification and structure analyses of biological macromolecules, [especially] for their development of soft desorption ionisation methods for mass spectrometric analyses of biological macromolecules"
2002	Kurt Wüthrich (1938–present)	Swiss	"for the development of methods for identification and structure analyses of biological macromolecules, [especially] for his development of nuclear magnetic resonance spectroscopy for determining the three-dimensional structure of biological macromolecules in solution"
2003	Peter Agre (1949–present)	American	"for discoveries concerning channels in cell membranes, [especially] for the discovery of water channels"
2003	Roderick MacKinnon (1956–present)	American	"for discoveries concerning channels in cell membranes, [especially] for structural and mechanistic studies of ion channels"
2004	Aaron Ciechanover (1947–present)	Israeli	"for the discovery of ubiquitin-mediated protein degradation"
2004	Avram Hershko (1937–present)	Israeli	"for the discovery of ubiquitin-mediated protein degradation"
2004	Irwin Rose (1926–2015)	American	"for the discovery of ubiquitin-mediated protein degradation"
2005	Yves Chauvin (1930–2015)	French	"for the development of the metathesis method in organic synthesis"
2005	Robert H. Grubbs (1942–2021)	American	"for the development of the metathesis method in organic synthesis"
2005	Richard R. Schrock (1945–present)	American	"for the development of the metathesis method in organic synthesis"
2006	Roger D. Kornberg (1947–present)	American	"for his studies of the molecular basis of eukaryotic transcription"
2007	Gerhard Ertl (1936–present)	German	"for his studies of chemical processes on solid surfaces"
2008	Osamu Shimomura (1928–2018)	Japanese	"for the discovery and development of the green fluorescent protein, GFP"
2008	Martin Chalfie (1947–present)	American	"for the discovery and development of the green fluorescent protein, GFP"
2008	Roger Y. Tsien (1952–2016)	American	"for the discovery and development of the green fluorescent protein, GFP"
2009	Venkatraman Ramakrishnan (1952–present)	American; British	"for studies of the structure and function of the ribosome"
2009	Thomas A. Steitz (1940–2018)	American	"for studies of the structure and function of the ribosome"
2009	Ada Yonath (1939–2026)	Israeli	"for studies of the structure and function of the ribosome"
2010	Richard F. Heck (1931–2015)	American	"for palladium-catalyzed cross couplings in organic synthesis"
2010	Ei-ichi Negishi (1935–2021)	Japanese	"for palladium-catalyzed cross couplings in organic synthesis"
2010	Akira Suzuki (1930–present)	Japanese	"for palladium-catalyzed cross couplings in organic synthesis"
2011	Dan Shechtman (1941–present)	American; Israeli	"for the discovery of quasicrystals"
2012	Robert Lefkowitz (1943–present)	American	"for studies of G-protein-coupled receptors"
2012	Brian Kobilka (1955–present)	American	"for studies of G-protein-coupled receptors"
2013	Martin Karplus (1930–2024)	American; Austrian	"for the development of multiscale models for complex chemical systems"
2013	Michael Levitt (1947–present)	American; British; Israeli; South African	"for the development of multiscale models for complex chemical systems"
2013	Arieh Warshel (1940–present)	American; Israeli	"for the development of multiscale models for complex chemical systems"
2014	Eric Betzig (1960–present)	American	"for the development of super-resolved fluorescence microscopy"
2014	Stefan Hell (1962–present)	German; Romanian	"for the development of super-resolved fluorescence microscopy"
2014	William E. Moerner (1953–present)	American	"for the development of super-resolved fluorescence microscopy"
2015	Tomas Lindahl (1938–present)	British; Swedish	"for mechanistic studies of DNA repair"
2015	Paul L. Modrich (1946–present)	American	"for mechanistic studies of DNA repair"
2015	Aziz Sancar (1946–present)	Turkish	"for mechanistic studies of DNA repair"
2016	Ben Feringa (1951–present)	Dutch	"for the design and synthesis of molecular machines"
2016	Jean-Pierre Sauvage (1944–present)	French	"for the design and synthesis of molecular machines"
2016	Fraser Stoddart (1942–2024)	American; British	"for the design and synthesis of molecular machines"
2017	Jacques Dubochet (1942–present)	Swiss	"for developing cryo-electron microscopy for the high-resolution structure determination of biomolecules in solution"
2017	Joachim Frank (1940–present)	American; German	"for developing cryo-electron microscopy for the high-resolution structure determination of biomolecules in solution"
2017	Richard Henderson (1945–present)	British	"for developing cryo-electron microscopy for the high-resolution structure determination of biomolecules in solution"
2018	Frances Arnold (1956–present)	American	"for the directed evolution of enzymes"
2018	George Smith (1941–present)	American	"for the phage display of peptides and antibodies"
2018	Greg Winter (1951–present)	British	"for the phage display of peptides and antibodies"
2019	John B. Goodenough (1922–2023)	American	"for the development of lithium ion batteries"
2019	M. Stanley Whittingham (1941–present)	American; British	"for the development of lithium ion batteries"
2019	Akira Yoshino (1948–present)	Japanese	"for the development of lithium ion batteries"
2020	Emmanuelle Charpentier (1968–present)	French	"for the development of a method for genome editing"
2020	Jennifer Doudna (1964–present)	American	"for the development of a method for genome editing"
2021	Benjamin List (1968–present)	German	"for the development of asymmetric organocatalysis"
2021	David W. C. MacMillan (1968–present)	British	"for the development of asymmetric organocatalysis"
2022	Carolyn Bertozzi (1966–present)	American	"for the development of click chemistry and bioorthogonal chemistry"
2022	Morten Meldal (1954–present)	Danish	"for the development of click chemistry and bioorthogonal chemistry"
2022	Barry Sharpless (1941–present)	American	"for the development of click chemistry and bioorthogonal chemistry"
2023	Moungi Bawendi (1961–present)	American; French; Tunisian	"for the discovery and synthesis of quantum dots"
2023	Louis E. Brus (1943–2026)	American	"for the discovery and synthesis of quantum dots"
2023	Alexey Ekimov (1945–present)	Russian	"for the discovery and synthesis of quantum dots"
2024	David Baker (1962–present)	American	"for computational protein design"
2024	Demis Hassabis (1976–present)	British	"for protein structure prediction"
2024	John M. Jumper (1985–present)	American	"for protein structure prediction"
2025	Susumu Kitagawa (1951–present)	Japanese	"for the development of metal–organic frameworks"
2025	Richard Robson (1937–present)	British	"for the development of metal–organic frameworks"
2025	Omar M. Yaghi (1965–present)	American; Jordanian	"for the development of metal–organic frameworks"
2026	Henri B. Kagan (1930–present)	French	"for the discovery of non-linear effects and autocatalysis in asymmetric organic synthesis"
2026	Kensō Soai (1950–present)	Japanese	"for the discovery of non-linear effects and autocatalysis in asymmetric organic synthesis"

== Nobel laureates by country ==
The Nobel laureates in chemistry from 1901 to 2026 came from the following countries:

Country	Number of laureates
United States	82
United Kingdom	36
Germany	32
France	13
Japan	11
Switzerland	7
Canada	7
Israel	6
Sweden	5
Netherlands	4
Austria	4
Hungary	2
Norway	2
Denmark	2
New Zealand	2
Russia	2
Poland	2
Argentina	1
Australia	1
Belgium	1
Taiwan	1
Latvia	1
Czechia	1
Egypt	1
Mexico	1
Finland	1
South Africa	1
Romania	1
Italy	1
Tunisia	1
Turkey	1
Jordan	1

== See also ==
- Timeline of chemistry
