= Hartmuth C. Kolb =

German chemist (born 1964)

- Education: University of Hanover (BS); Imperial College London (PhD)
- Known for: Click chemistry
- Scientific career
- Fields: Organic chemistry
- Workplaces: Ciba-Geigy; Coelacanth Corporation; Scripps Research Institute; University of California, Los Angeles; Siemens Healthcare; Avid Radiopharmaceuticals; Janssen Research & Development; Enigma Biomedical Group; University of Wisconsin–Madison
- Thesis: Synthesis of the decalin fragment of azadirachtin (1991)
- Doctoral advisor: Steven V. Ley

Hartmuth Christian Kolb (born 10 August 1964) is a German chemist. He is considered one of the founders of click chemistry.

== Early life and education ==
After graduating from high school in Marsberg in 1983, Kolb studied at the University of Hanover under the direction of Professor H.M.R. Hoffmann. He received his doctorate in 1991 as an academic student of Steven Ley at Imperial College London with a thesis on preparative organic chemistry (Synthesis of the decalin fragment of azadirachtin). As a postdoctoral fellow he worked with Barry Sharpless at the Scripps Research Institute in La Jolla, California.

== Career ==
He then worked in the research department of Ciba-Geigy in Basel from 1993 to 1997 before taking up a managerial position at Coelacanth Corporation, founded by Sharpless and A. Bader in Princeton, New Jersey. Coelacanth was eventually acquired by Lexicon Pharmaceuticals.

In 2002, Kolb obtained an associate professorship in the Department of Chemistry at the Scripps Research Institute. Kolb later obtained a professorship at the University of California, Los Angeles.

In 2004 Kolb returned to industry and became Vice President of Molecular Imaging Biomarker Research at Siemens Healthcare in Culver City, California. In 2013, Siemens sold two of the Positron Emission Tomography (PET) radiotracers developed there to Eli Lilly and Company, most notably the Tau PET tracer [18F]-T807 (aka AV1451, Flortaucipir, Tauvid), now FDA approved for PET imaging of the brain to estimate the density and distribution of aggregated tau neurofibrillary tangles (NFTs) in adult patients with cognitive impairment who are being evaluated for Alzheimer's disease (AD). Simultaneously, Kolb joined Avid Radiopharmaceuticals in Philadelphia, Pennsylvania, a subsidiary of Eli Lilly and Company, as vice president of research, and later Janssen Research & Development (Johnson & Johnson) as vice president of Neuroscience Biomarkers & Global Imaging.

After leaving Johnson & Johnson in 2024, he joined Enigma Biomedical Group as their Chief Scientific Officer to focus on the development of CNS imaging tracers. He is also Visiting Professor at the University of Wisconsin–Madison.

== Work ==
Together with Barry Sharpless and M.G. Finn, Kolb developed the concept of click chemistry, an approach to simplify synthesis by focusing on a few chemical reactions that are similar in nature. The associated scientific publication Click chemistry: diverse chemical function from a few good reactions has been cited more than 20,000 times (as of 2025) and was the foundation for the 2022 Nobel Prize in Chemistry for K. Barry Sharpless, Carolyn Bertozzi and Morten Meldal. Kolb refined the method by combining it as in-situ click chemistry with microfluidic processes. This makes it particularly easy to synthesize new inhibitors for various enzymes.

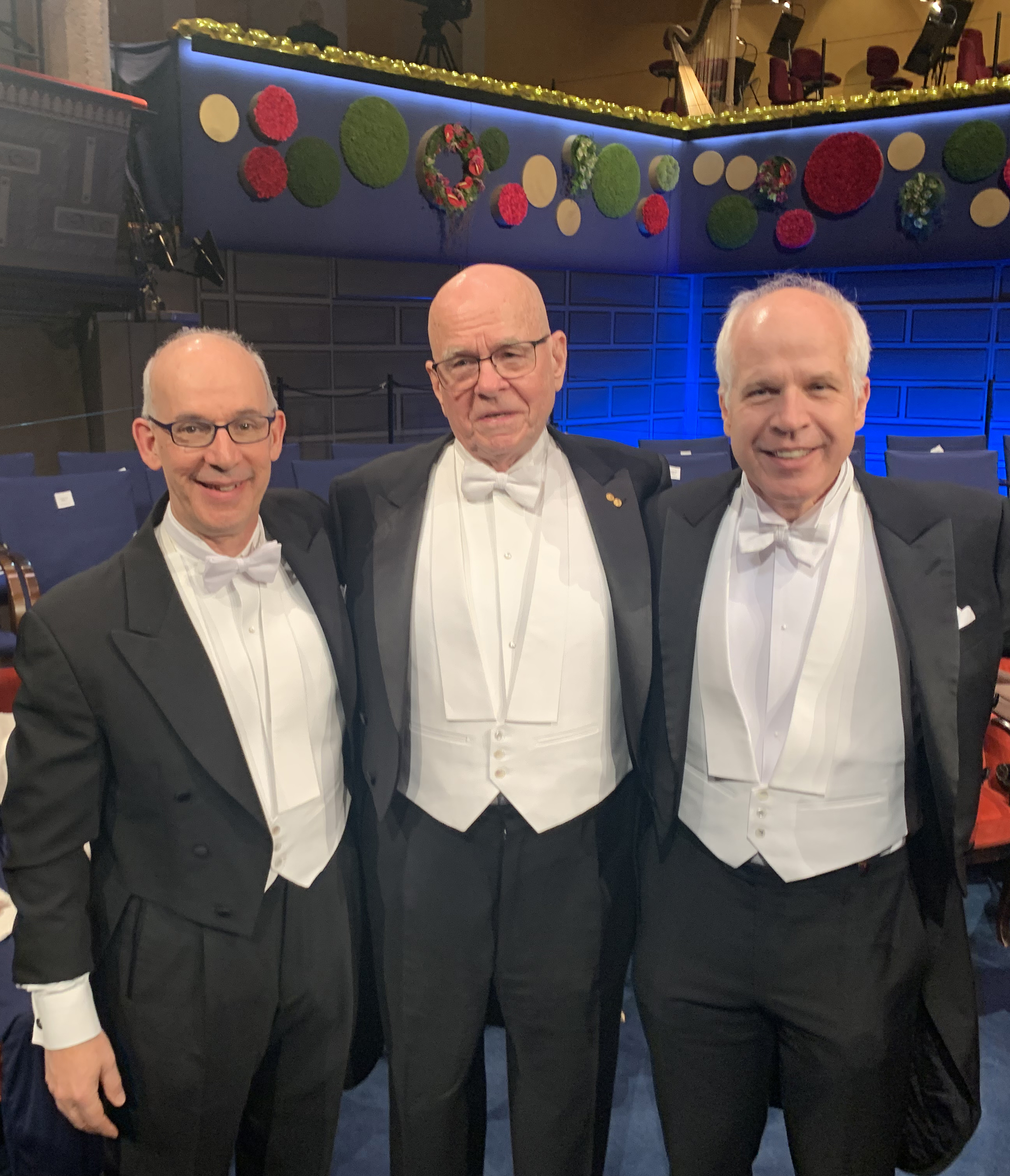
K. Barry Sharpless (center) with collaborators Hartmuth Kolb (right) and M.G. Finn (left) at the 2022 Nobel awards ceremony.

Kolb's more recent work deals with the synthesis of new tracers for positron emission tomography (e.g. for detecting the tau protein in Alzheimer's disease) and with the clinical testing of these tracers, a key highlight being [18F]-T807, also known as AV1451, Flortaucipir, Tauvid, which was approved in 2020 by the US food and drug administration (FDA) for imaging neurofibrillary tangles in adults who are being evaluated for Alzheimer's Disease.

Kolb's lab has developed a blood plasma assay for phospho-217-Tau (p217Tau), which shows potential as a highly accurate peripheral biomarker for amyloid and Tau status in Alzheimer's Disease.

== Awards ==
Kolb was chosen as the recipient of the 2015 Alzheimer Award by the Journal of Alzheimer's Disease and he was one of the recipients of the Royal Society of Chemistry 2021 Organic Division Horizon Prize: Robert Robinson Award in Synthetic Organic Chemistry.
