= 3-Azidocoumarin =

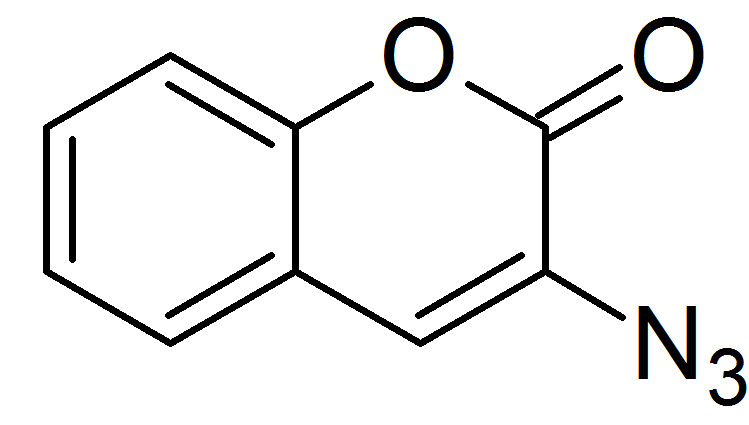

Names
- Preferred IUPAC name 3-Azido-2H-1-benzopyran-2-one

Identifiers
CAS Number	152711-55-2
3D model (JSmol)	Interactive image
ChemSpider	24771406
PubChem CID	53238503
UNII	TEF9P494MN
CompTox Dashboard (EPA)	DTXSID50692873
- InChI: InChI=1S/C9H5N3O2/c10-12-11-7-5-6-3-1-2-4-8(6)14-9(7)13/h1-5H Key: CYWSDGUZWKUALI-UHFFFAOYSA-N
- SMILES: O=C1C(N=[N+]=[N-])=CC2=CC=CC=C2O1

Properties
Chemical formula	C_{9}H_{6}N_{3}O_{2}
Molar mass	188.166 g·mol^{−1}
Appearance	Brown solid
Melting point	108 to 112 °C (226 to 234 °F; 381 to 385 K)
- Except where otherwise noted, data are given for materials in their standard state (at 25 °C [77 °F], 100 kPa). verify (what is ?) Infobox references

3-Azidocoumarin is an organic compound that is used in the area of bioconjugation. It is a derivative of coumarin, a natural product and precursor for the widely used Coumadin. Azidocoumarin has emerged as a widely applicable labeling agent in diverse biological systems. In particular, it participates in the aptly named click reaction with alkynes. Bioconjugation involves the labeling of certain cellular components and is applicable to fields such a proteomics and functional genomics with a detachable, fluorescent tag.

== Synthesis ==
A common way to produce the 3-azidocoumarin is by condensation of salicylaldehyde and N-acetylglycine or nitroacetate. The intermediate is trapped with sodium azide to produce the 3-azidocoumarin. The isomeric 4-azidocoumarin (CAS# 42373-56-8) product can also be prepared from 4-hydroxycoumarin via the 4-chloro derivative, which reacts with sodium azide.

== Uses ==
This compound is used for bioconjugation. The target, which contains a terminal alkyne functional group, is treated with the organic azide in the presence of a Cu(I) catalyst. The resulting 1,2,3-triazole is fluorescent. The coumarin backbone is chosen to be used as the profluorophore due to its small size, biocompatibility, and its ability to be easily manipulated synthetically. Illustrative of this is the labeling of biological compounds such as the protein calmodulin. Neither the azidocoumarin nor the alkyne substrate fluoresce. Azidocoumarin is also inert in biological systems and insensitive to pH and solvent. A variety of azidocoumarin compounds have been evaluated.
