= Karl Barry Sharpless =

American chemist and Nobel Laureate (born 1941)

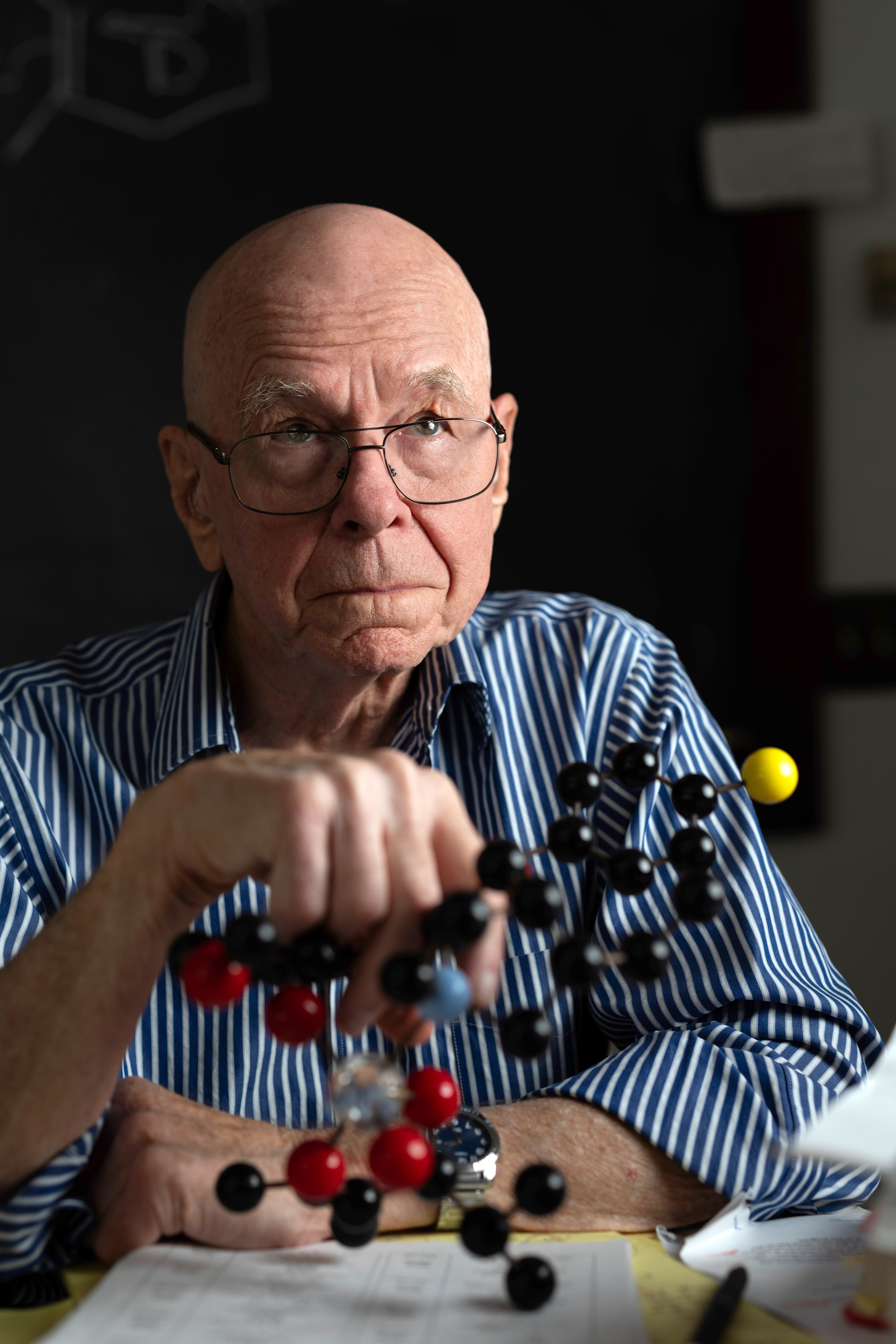
- Sharpless in 2026
- Born: Karl Barry Sharpless; April 28, 1941 (age 85); Philadelphia, Pennsylvania, U.S.
- Education: Dartmouth College (BA); Stanford University (MS, PhD)
- Known for: Enantioselective synthesis; Click chemistry
- Spouse: Jan Dueser (m. 1965)
- Awards: Chemical Pioneer Award (1988); Scheele Award (1991); Arthur C. Cope Award (1992); Tetrahedron Prize (1993); King Faisal International Prize (1995); Harvey Prize (1998); Chirality Medal (2000); Benjamin Franklin Medal (2001); Wolf Prize (2001); Nobel Prize in Chemistry (2001, 2022); William H. Nichols Medal (2006); Priestley Medal (2019)
- Scientific career
- Fields: Stereochemistry
- Workplaces: Massachusetts Institute of Technology; Stanford University; The Scripps Research Institute; Kyushu University
- Thesis: Studies of the Mechanism of Action of 2,3-oxidosqualene-lanosterol cyclase: Featuring Enzymic Cyclization of Modified Squalene Oxides (1968)
- Doctoral advisor: Eugene van Tamelen
- Doctoral students: M.G. Finn
- Other notable students: Undergrads: Gregory Fu; Post-docs: Eric Jacobsen; Hartmuth Kolb

Karl Barry Sharpless (born April 28, 1941) is an American stereochemist. He is a two-time Nobel laureate in chemistry, known for his work on stereoselective reactions and click chemistry.

Sharpless was awarded half of the 2001 Nobel Prize in Chemistry "for his work on chirally catalysed oxidation reactions", and one third of the 2022 prize, jointly with Carolyn R. Bertozzi and Morten P. Meldal, "for the development of click chemistry and bioorthogonal chemistry". Sharpless is the fifth person (in addition to two organizations) to have twice been awarded a Nobel prize, along with Marie Curie, John Bardeen, Linus Pauling and Frederick Sanger, and the third to have been awarded two prizes in the same discipline (after Bardeen and Sanger).

== Early life and education ==
Sharpless was born April 28, 1941, in Philadelphia, Pennsylvania. His childhood was filled with summers at his family cottage on the Manasquan River in New Jersey. This is where Sharpless developed a love for fishing that he would continue throughout his life, spending summers in college working on fishing boats. He graduated from Friends' Central School in 1959, and continued his studies at Dartmouth College, earning an A.B. degree in 1963. Sharpless originally planned to attend medical school after his undergraduate degree, but his research professor convinced him to continue his education in chemistry. He earned his Ph.D. in organic chemistry from Stanford University in 1968 under Eugene van Tamelen. He continued post-doctoral work at Stanford University (1968–1969) with James P. Collman, working on organometallic chemistry. Sharpless then moved to Harvard University (1969–1970), studying enzymology in Konrad E. Bloch's lab.

== Academic career ==
Sharpless was a professor at the Massachusetts Institute of Technology (1970–1977, 1980–1990) and Stanford University (1977–1980). While at Stanford, Sharpless discovered Sharpless asymmetric epoxidation, which was used to make (+)-disparlure. As of 2023, Sharpless led a laboratory at Scripps Research.

== Research ==
Sharpless developed stereoselective oxidation reactions, and showed that the formation of an inhibitor with femtomolar potency can be catalyzed by the enzyme acetylcholinesterase, beginning with an azide and an alkyne. He discovered several chemical reactions which have transformed asymmetric synthesis from science fiction to the relatively routine, including aminohydroxylation, dihydroxylation, and the Sharpless asymmetric epoxidation.

In 2001 he was awarded a half-share of the Nobel Prize in Chemistry for his work on chirally catalyzed oxidation reactions (Sharpless epoxidation, Sharpless asymmetric dihydroxylation, Sharpless oxyamination). The other half of the year's Prize was shared between William S. Knowles and Ryōji Noyori (for their work on stereoselective hydrogenation).

The term "click chemistry" was coined by Sharpless around the year 2000, and was first fully described by Sharpless, Hartmuth Kolb, and M.G. Finn at The Scripps Research Institute in 2001. This involves a set of highly selective, exothermic reactions which occur under mild conditions; the most successful example is the azide alkyne Huisgen cycloaddition to form 1,2,3-triazoles.

As of 2024, Sharpless has an h-index of 130 according to Scopus.

== Awards and honors ==
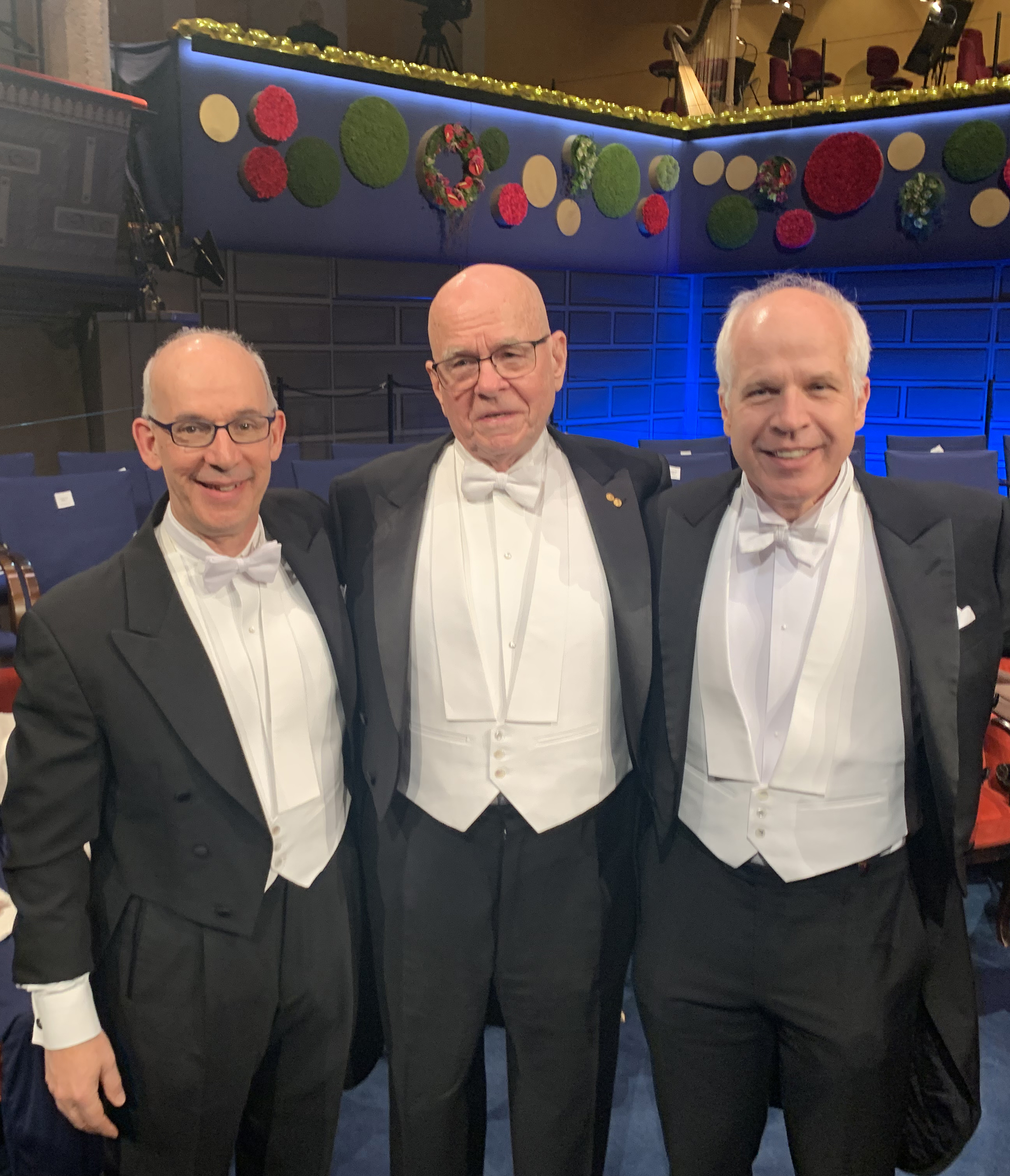
Sharpless (center) with click chemistry collaborators M.G. Finn (left) and Hartmuth C. Kolb (right) at the 2022 Nobel awards ceremony

Sharpless is a two-time Nobel laureate. He is a recipient of the 2001 and 2022 Nobel Prize in Chemistry for his work on "chirally catalysed oxidation reactions", and "click chemistry", respectively.

He was awarded the 2001 Wolf Prize in Chemistry together with Henri B. Kagan and Ryoji Noyori “for their work in developing asymmetric catalysis for the synthesis of chiral molecules, which aid in the manufacturing of multiple useful products.

In 2019, Sharpless was awarded the Priestley Medal, the American Chemical Society's highest honor, for "the invention of catalytic, asymmetric oxidation methods, the concept of click chemistry and development of the copper-catalyzed version of the azide-acetylene cycloaddition reaction". He received the Gold Medal of the American Institute of Chemists in 2023.

He is Distinguished University Professor at Kyushu University. He holds honorary degrees from the KTH Royal Institute of Technology (1995), Technical University of Munich (1995), Catholic University of Louvain (1996) and Wesleyan University (1999).

== Personal life ==
Sharpless married Jan Dueser in 1965 and they have three children. He was blinded in one eye during a lab accident in 1970 where an NMR tube exploded, shortly after he arrived at MIT as an assistant professor. After this accident, Sharpless stresses "there's simply never an adequate excuse for not wearing safety glasses in the laboratory at all times."
