= Click chemistry =

Modular approach to chemical synthesis

Click chemistry is an approach to chemical synthesis that is used to join two molecules. The application of the term, click, as a qualifier to the type of chemistry refers to an emphasis on efficiency and simplicity. To link two molecular components, each is first fitted with appropriate functional groups, such as azide and alkyne groups. These components are then "clicked" together in a process that is highly favorable and which tolerates many functional groups that might complicate other coupling processes.

== History ==
Click Chemistry was first fully described by K. Barry Sharpless, Hartmuth C. Kolb, and M. G. Finn of The Scripps Research Institute in 2001. The paper argued that synthetic chemistry could emulate the way nature constructs complex molecules, using efficient reactions to join together simple, non-toxic building blocks.

Many perspectives have been offered on the concepts or principles of Click Chemistry. Some of these attributes include the quest for selectivity and ease of implementation, which of course, is a goal for many or most chemical reactions.

Click Chemistry was founded on the recognition that most compounds in biology are "stitched together" by formation of C-heteroatom bonds (heteroatom = N, O, S). Few major classes of structurally complex organic compounds have more than six contiguous C-C bonds (except aryl derivatives). C-heteroatom bond forming reactions are often highly favorable and thus these bonds are strong. Of these C-heteroatom bond forming reactions, a few are particularly easy to implement. Sharpless et al. recommended a focus on certain cycloadditions, nucleophilic substitutions involving strained substrates, formation of ureas and ethers, and additions of heteroatoms to C=C bonds. Not mentioned in this landmark review was the Huisgen 1,3-dipolar cycloaddition, possibly because it was slow. The year after publication of Sharpless's review, Tornøe, Christensen, and Meldal at the Carlsberg Laboratory, Denmark described the copper-catalyzed addition of azides to alkynes, with no mention of Sharpless et al. nor of Click Chemistry. Meldal's innovation became the paradigmatic reaction of Click Chemistry. One set of particularly significant reports regarding azide couplings came from the Bertozzi lab who conducted the reaction within living cells.

In 2022, the Nobel Prize in Chemistry was jointly awarded to Carolyn R. Bertozzi, Morten P. Meldal, and Karl Barry Sharpless, "for the development of click chemistry and bioorthogonal chemistry".

== Click reactions ==
=== Copper(I)-catalyzed azide-alkyne cycloaddition (CuAAC) ===
The classic click reaction is the copper-catalyzed reaction of an azide with an alkyne to form a 5-membered C_{2}N_{3} ring. This reaction is the Cu(I)-catalyzed azide-alkyne cycloaddition (CuAAC). The first triazole synthesis, from diethyl acetylenedicarboxylate and phenyl azide, was reported by Arthur Michael in 1893. Later, in the middle of the twentieth century, this family of 1,3-dipolar cycloadditions took on Rolf Huisgen's name after his studies of their reaction kinetics and conditions.

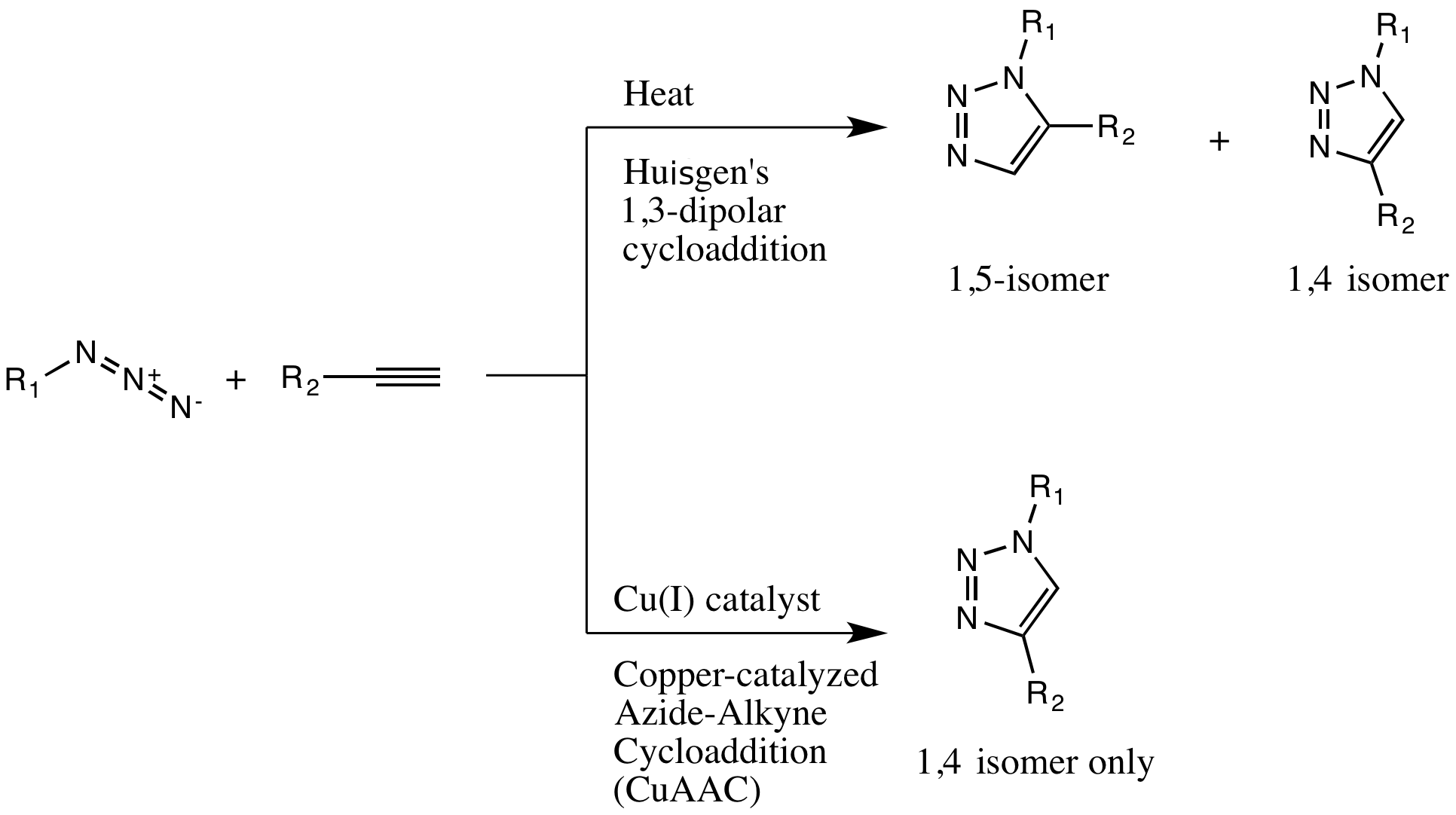
A comparison of the Huisgen and the copper-catalyzed Azide-Alkyne cycloadditions

The copper-catalysis of the Huisgen 1,3-dipolar cycloaddition was discovered concurrently and independently by the groups of Fokin and Sharpless and Meldal. The copper-catalyzed version of this reaction gives only the 1,4-isomer, whereas Huisgen's non-catalyzed 1,3-dipolar cycloaddition gives both the 1,4- and 1,5-isomers and requires a temperature of 100 °C.

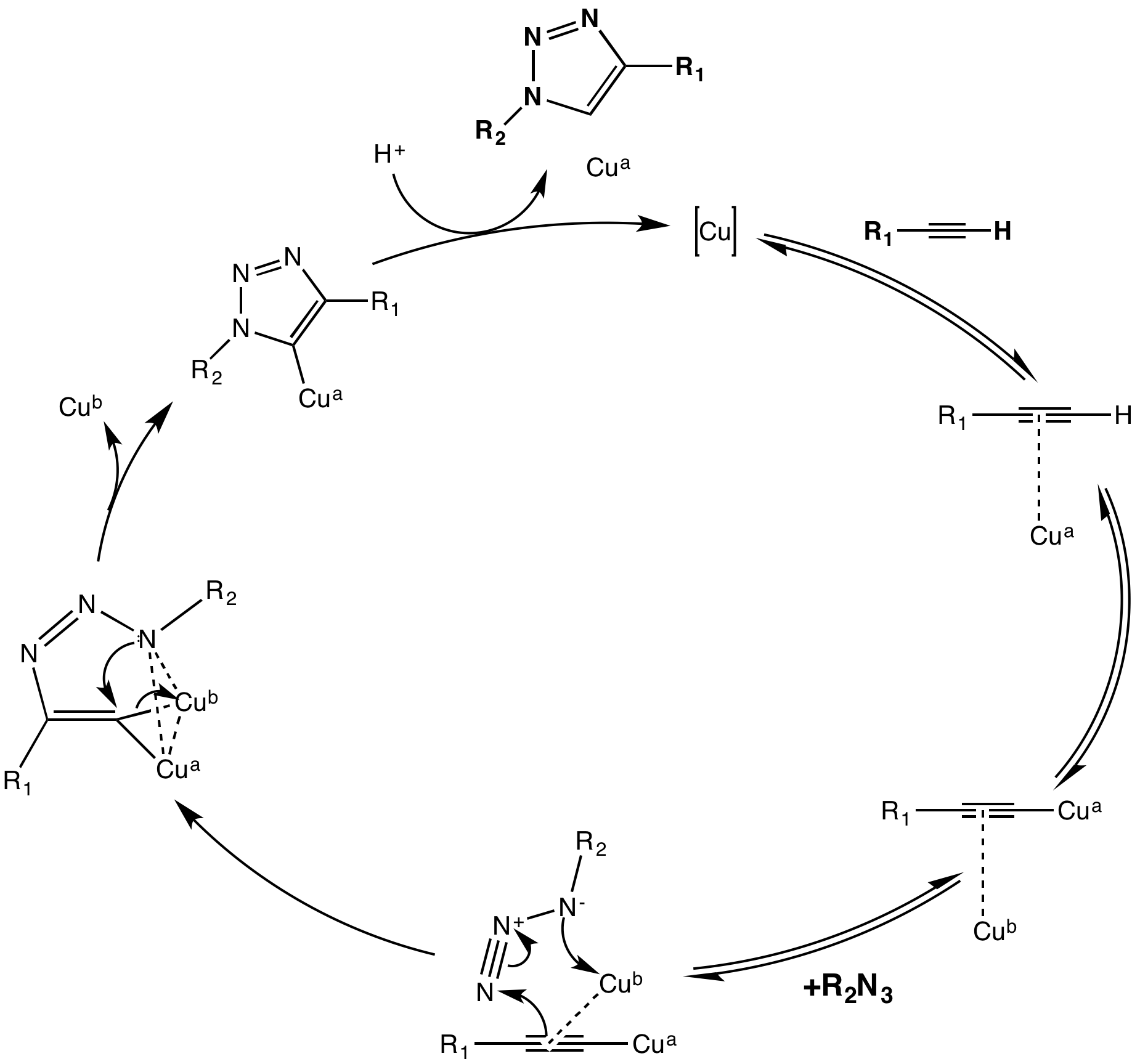
The two-copper mechanism of the CuAAC catalytic cycle

Even though this reaction proceeds effectively at biological conditions, copper in this range of dosage is cytotoxic. Solutions to this problem have been presented, such as using water-soluble ligands on the copper to enhance cell penetration of the catalyst and thereby minimize the dosage needed, An analogous "RuAAC reaction" (catalyzed by ruthenium, instead of copper) allows for the selective production of 1,5-isomers.

=== Strain-promoted azide-alkyne cycloaddition (SPAAC) ===
Metal-free click reactions have gained prominence due to their enhanced biocompatibility and reduced cytotoxicity. Notably, the strain-promoted azide–alkyne cycloaddition (SPAAC) and inverse electron-demand Diels–Alder (IEDDA) reactions have been widely adopted for bioorthogonal labeling in living systems. These reactions offer high specificity without the need for metal catalysts, making them ideal for applications in living organisms and complex environments.

Versions of Huisgen's copper-free click reactions minimize the cytotoxicity.

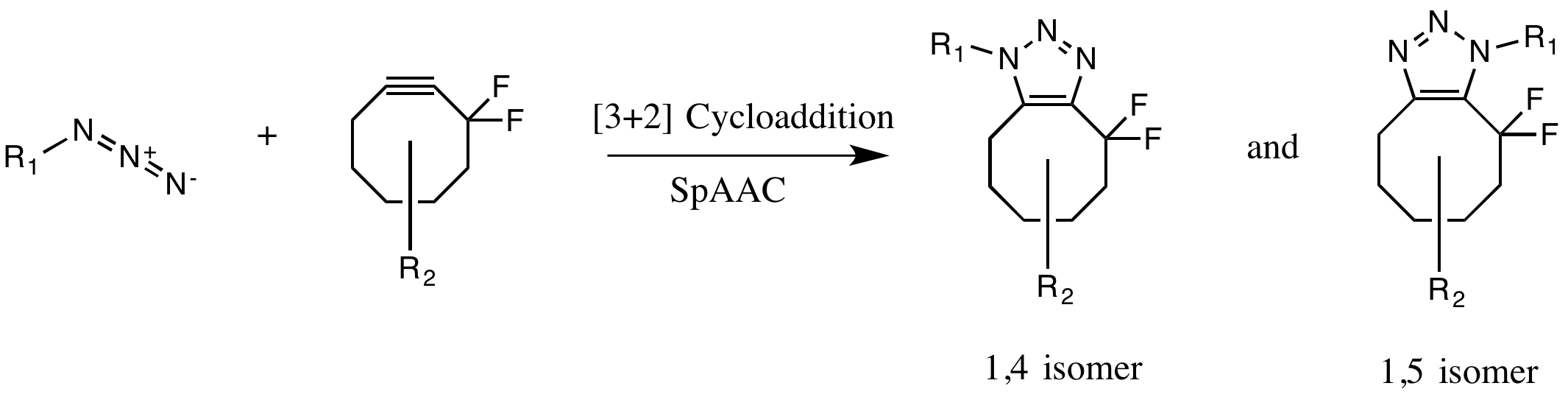
Scheme of the Strain-promoted Azide-Alkyne Cycloaddition

=== Strain-promoted alkyne-nitrone cycloaddition (SPANC) ===
Diaryl-strained-cyclooctynes including dibenzylcyclooctyne (DIBO) have also been used to react with 1,3-nitrones in strain-promoted alkyne-nitrone cycloadditions (SPANC) to yield N-alkylated isoxazolines.

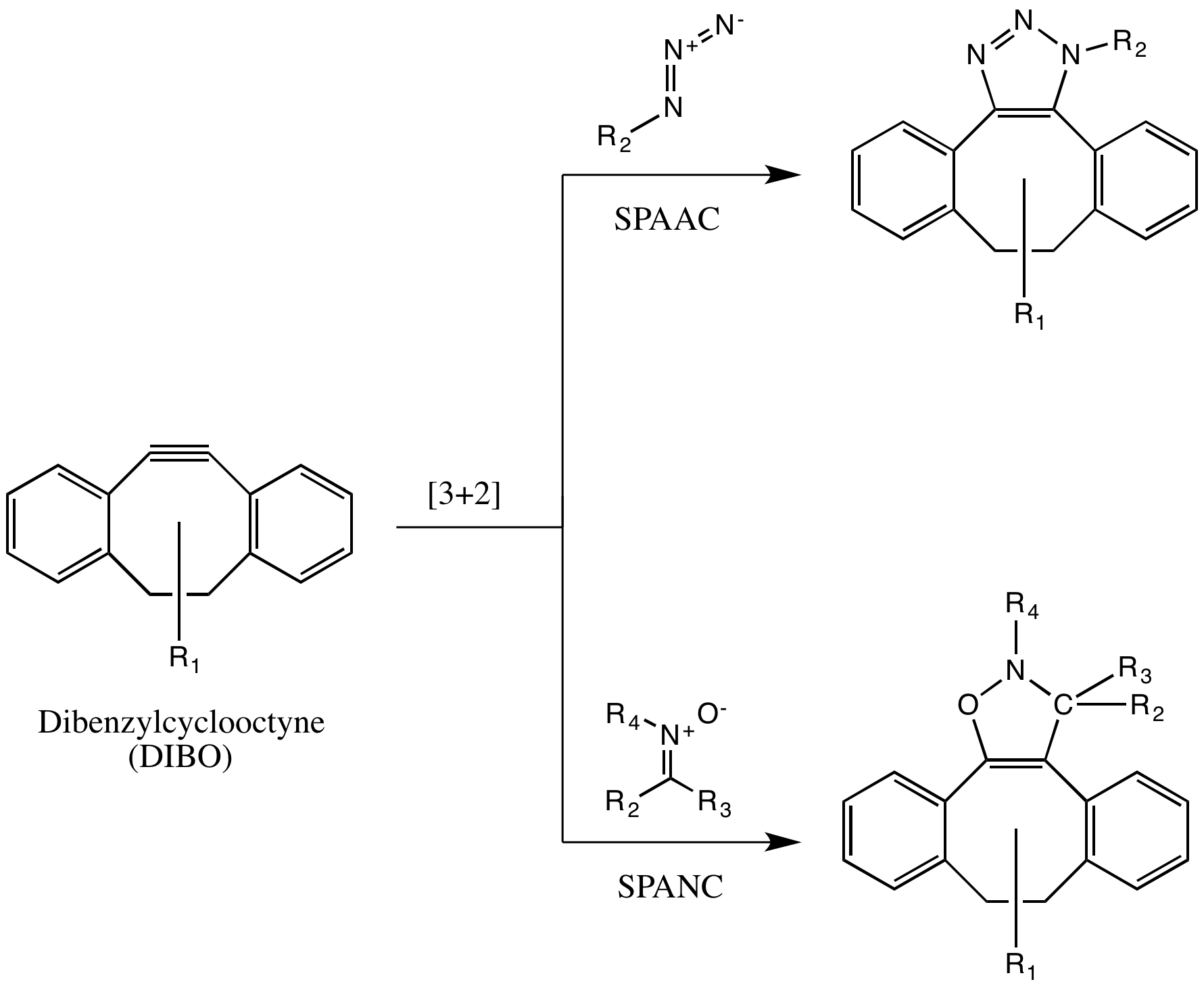
The SPAAC vs SpANC reaction

Because this reaction is metal-free and proceeds with fast kinetics (k2 as fast as 60 1/Ms, faster than both the CuAAC or the SPAAC) SPANC can be used for live cell labeling. Moreover, substitution on both the carbon and nitrogen atoms of the nitrone dipole, and acyclic and endocyclic nitrones are all tolerated. This large allowance provides a lot of flexibility for nitrone handle or probe incorporation.

However, the isoxazoline product is not as stable as the triazole product of the CuAAC and the SpAAC, and can undergo rearrangements at biological conditions. Regardless, this reaction is still very useful as it has notably fast reaction kinetics.

The applications of this reaction include labeling proteins containing serine as the first residue: the serine is oxidized to aldehyde with NaIO_{4} and then converted to nitrone with p-methoxybenzenethiol, N-methylhydroxylamine and p-ansidine, and finally is incubated with cyclooctyne to give a click product. The SPANC also allows for multiplex labeling.

=== Reactions of strained alkenes ===
Strained alkenes also use strain-relief as a driving force that allows for their participation in click reactions. Trans-cycloalkenes (usually cyclooctenes) and other strained alkenes such as oxanorbornadiene react in click reactions with a number of partners including azides, tetrazines, and tetrazoles. These reaction partners may interact specifically with the strained alkene, staying bioorthogonal to endogenous alkenes found in lipids, fatty acids, cofactors, and other natural products.

==== Alkene and tetrazine inverse-demand Diels-Alder ====
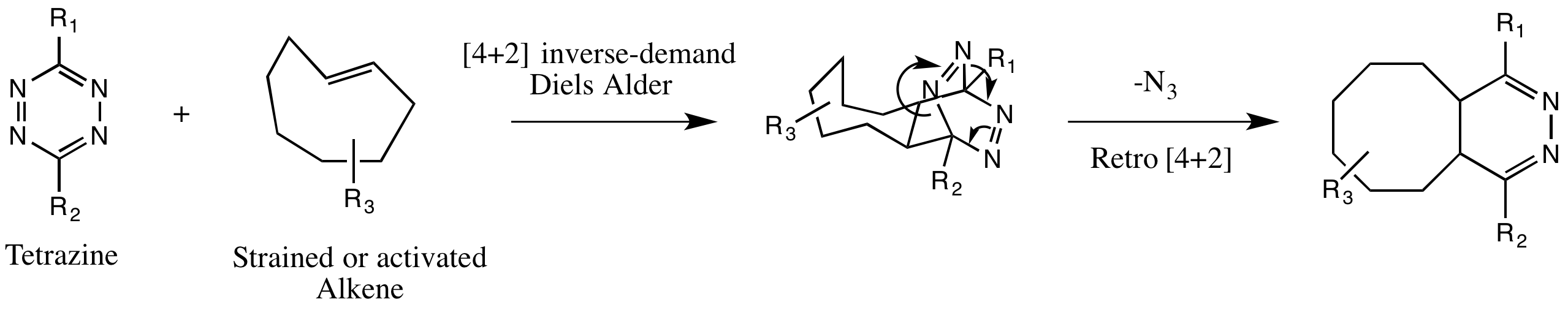
A Tetrazine-Alkene reaction between a generalized tetrazine and a strained, trans-cyclooctene

Strained cyclooctenes and other activated alkenes react with tetrazines in an inverse electron-demand Diels-Alder reaction followed by a retro [4+2] cycloaddition (see figure). Three-membered and four-membered cycloalkenes, due to their high ring strain, also make ideal alkene substrates.

Similar to other [4+2] cycloadditions, electron-donating substituents on the dienophile and electron-withdrawing substituents on the diene accelerate the inverse-demand Diels-Alder reaction. The diene, the tetrazine, by virtue of having the additional nitrogens, is a good diene for this reaction. The dienophile, the activated alkene, may often be attached to electron-donating alkyl groups on target molecules, thus making the dienophile more suitable for the reaction.

==== Alkene and tetrazole photoclick reaction ====
The tetrazole-alkene "photoclick" reaction is another dipolar addition that Huisgen first introduced in the late 1960s (ChemBioChem 2007, 8, 1504. (68) Clovis, J. S.; Eckell, A.; Huisgen, R.; Sustmann, R. Chem. Ber. 1967, 100, 60). Tetrazoles with amino or styryl groups that may be activated by UV light at 365 nm react quickly, so that the UV light does not have to be on for a long time (usually approximately 1–4 minutes) to make fluorogenic pyrazoline products. This reaction scheme is well suited for the purpose of labeling in live cells, because UV light at 365 nm damages cells minimally.

Quantum yields for short wavelength UV light may be higher than 0.5, allowing tetrazoles to be used selectively in combination with another photoligation reactions, where at the short wavelength the tetrazole ligation reaction proceeds nearly exclusively and at longer wavelength other reactions (e.g. ligation via o-quinodimethanes) proceeds preferably. Finally, the non-fluorogenic reactants give rise to a fluorogenic product, equipping the reaction with a built-in spectrometric handle.

Both tetrazoles and the alkene groups have been incorporated as protein handles as unnatural amino acids, but this benefit is not unique. Instead, the photoinducibility of the reaction makes it a prime candidate for spatiotemporal specificity in living systems. Challenges include the presence of endogenous alkenes, although usually cis (as in fatty acids) they can still react with the activated tetrazole.

The PQ-ERA reaction has been optimized through thiophene substitution to enhance its reactivity, enabling more efficient photocycloaddition processes.

== Potential applications ==
=== Selective labeling and tracking of biomolecules ===
Click chemistry is often employed to attach visualizing tags. In many potential applications, click reactions join a biomolecule and a reporter molecule or other molecular probe, a process called bioconjugation. The possibility of attaching fluorophores and other reporter molecules has made click chemistry a tool for identifying, locating, and characterizing biomolecules. One of the earliest and most important methods in bioconjugation was to express a reporter gene, such as the gene green fluorescent protein (GFP), on the same genetic sequence as a protein of interest.

Examples of bioconjugation for labelling include the use of azidocoumarin to label alkyne groups in modified proteins and biomolecules. The fluorophore rhodamine has been coupled onto norbornene, and reacted with tetrazine in living systems. In other cases, SPAAC between a cyclooctyne-modified fluorophore and azide-tagged proteins allowed the selection of these proteins in cell lysates.

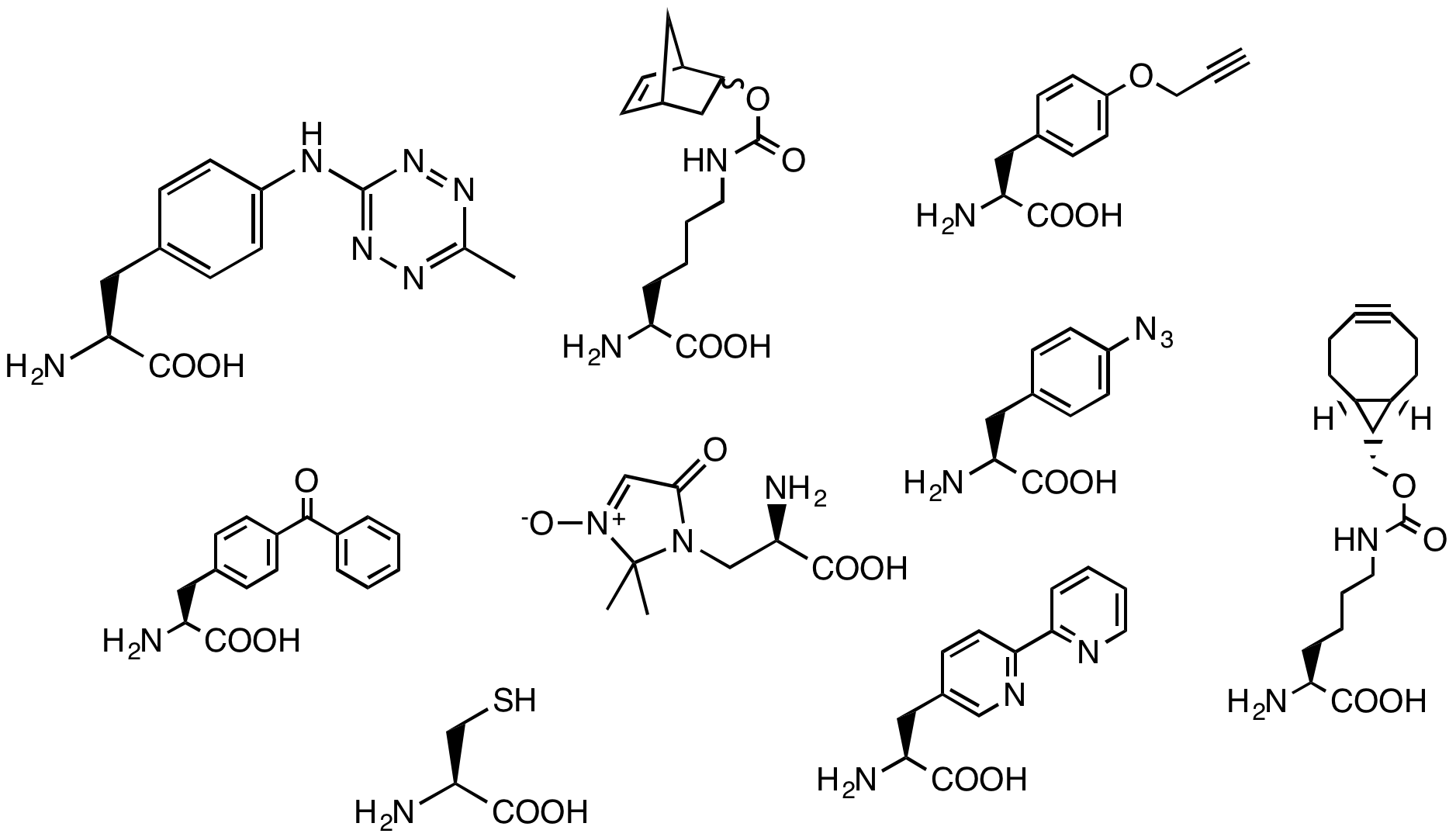
Unnatural Amino Acids

Methods for the incorporation of click reaction partners into systems in and ex vivo contribute to the scope of possible bioconjugation reactions. The development of unnatural amino acid incorporation by ribosomes has allowed for the incorporation of click reaction partners as unnatural side groups on these unnatural amino acids. For example, azidohomoalanine (AHA) is a methionine analog with an azide side group. This azide side group allows cycloalkynes to react to proteins that incorporate this "AHA" unnatural amino acid. In another example, "CpK" is a lysine analog. CpK has a side group including a cyclopropane alpha to an amide bond that serves as a reaction partner to tetrazine in an inverse diels-alder reaction.

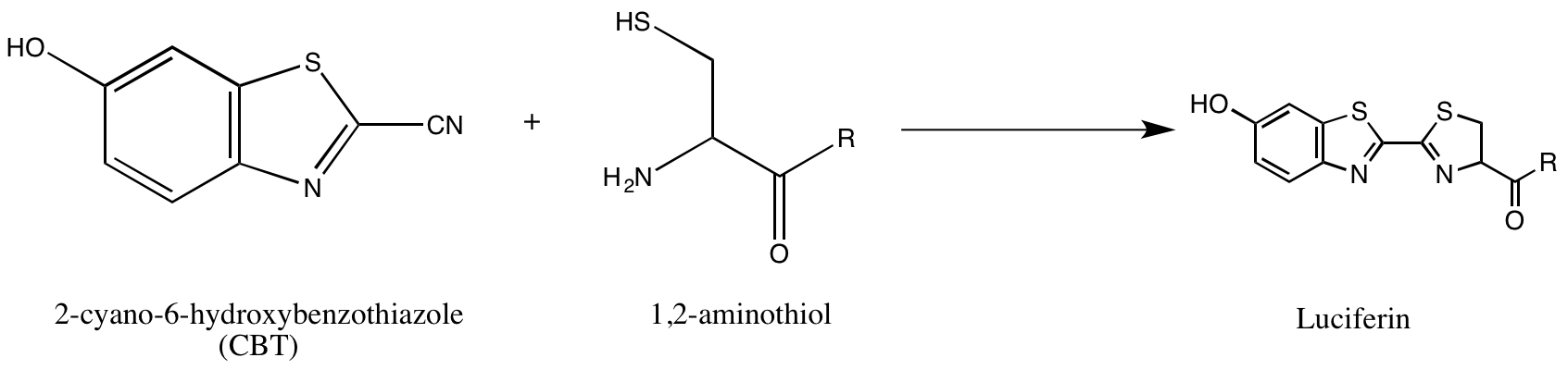
Scheme of the synthesis of firefly luciferin

The synthesis of luciferin exemplifies another strategy of isolating reaction partners, which is to take advantage of rarely-occurring, natural groups such as the 1,2-aminothiol, which appears only when a cysteine is the final N' amino acid in a protein. Their natural selectivity and relative bioorthogonality is thus valuable in developing probes specific for these tags. The above reaction occurs between a 1,2-aminothiol and a 2-cyanobenzothiazole to make luciferin, which is fluorescent. This luciferin fluorescence may then be quantified by spectrometry following a wash, and used to determine the relative presence of the molecule bearing the 1,2-aminothiol. If the quantification of non-1,2-aminothiol-bearing protein is desired, the protein of interest may be cleaved to yield a fragment with a N' Cys that is vulnerable to the 2-CBT.

=== Drug discovery and bio-conjugation ===
Click chemistry has become a cornerstone in drug discovery and bioconjugation. Its ability to rapidly and selectively form stable covalent bonds has facilitated the development of targeted therapeutics and diagnostic agents. Recent studies have explored the use of click chemistry in creating multifunctional drug delivery systems, enhancing the specificity and efficacy of treatments. The simplicity of click chemistry has had significant impact in many themes, especially pharmaceutical development.

Click chemistry been used in numerous drug studies to study their mechanism of action. Discoveries include that salinomycin localizes to lysosomes to initiate ferroptosis in cancer stem cells and that metformin derivatives accumulate in mitochondria to chelate copper(II), affecting metabolism and epigenetic changes downstream in inflammatory macrophages.

In combination with combinatorial chemistry, high-throughput screening, and building chemical libraries, click chemistry has hastened new drug discoveries by making each reaction in a multistep synthesis faster, more efficient, and predictable.

=== Other possible applications ===
Additional applications and potential applications include:

- ClickSeq, a method for generating next generation sequencing libraries
- two-dimensional gel electrophoresis separation
- preparative organic synthesis of 1,4-substituted triazoles
- modification of peptide function with triazoles
- modification of natural products and pharmaceuticals
- natural product discovery
- macrocyclizations using Cu(I) catalyzed triazole couplings
- modification of DNA and nucleotides by triazole ligation
- supramolecular chemistry: calixarenes, rotaxanes, and catenanes
- dendrimer design
- carbohydrate clusters and carbohydrate conjugation by Cu(1) catalyzed triazole ligation reactions
- synthesis of polymers and biopolymers
- attachment of molecular machinery to solid surfaces
- material science
- nanotechnology
- biomaterials

== Technology license ==
The Scripps Research Institute has a portfolio of click-chemistry patents. Licensees include Invitrogen, Allozyne, Aileron, Integrated Diagnostics, and the biotech company baseclick, a BASF spin-off created to sell products made using click chemistry. Moreover, baseclick holds a worldwide exclusive license for the research and diagnostic market for the nucleic acid field. Fluorescent azides and alkynes are also produced by companies such as Cyandye.
