= Flortaucipir (18F) =

Chemical compound

Flortaucipir (^{18}F)
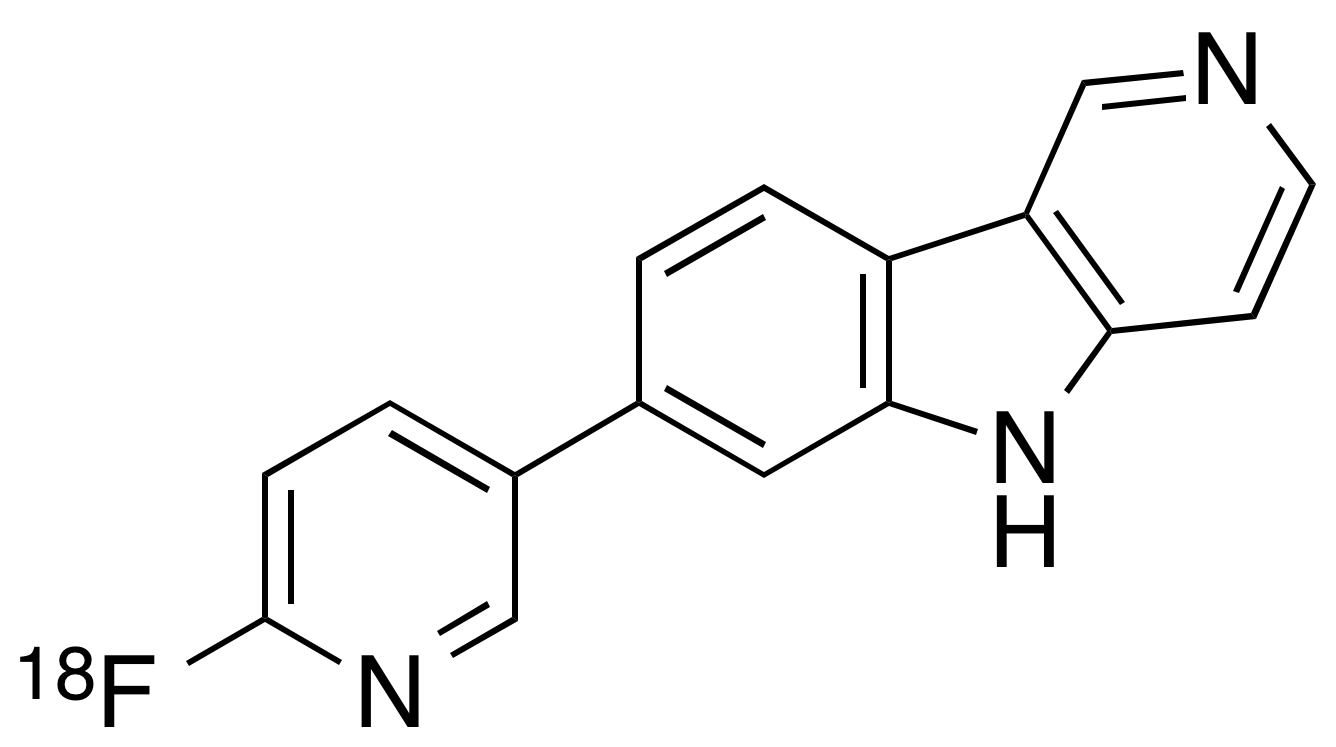

Clinical data
- Pronunciation: flor tau' si pir 18 F
- Trade names: Tauvid
- Other names: 18F-AV-1451, ^{18}F-AV-1451, ^{18}F-T807, Flortaucipir F-18, flortaucipir F 18 (USAN US)
- License data: US DailyMed: Flortaucipir
- Routes of administration: Intravenous
- ATC code: V09AX07 (WHO)

Legal status
- Legal status: US: ℞-only; EU: Rx-only

Identifiers
- IUPAC name: 7-(6-(18F)fluoropyridin-3-yl)-5H-pyrido[4,3-b]indole
- CAS Number: 1522051-90-6
- PubChem CID: 70957463
- DrugBank: DB14914
- ChemSpider: 32701063
- UNII: T1JP1KYU9O
- KEGG: D11210
- ChEMBL: ChEMBL3545253
- CompTox Dashboard (EPA): DTXSID001027893

Chemical and physical data
- Formula: C_{16}H_{10}^{18}FN_{3}
- Molar mass: 262.27 g·mol^{−1}
- 3D model (JSmol): Interactive image
- SMILES: C1=CC2=C(C=C1C3=CN=C(C=C3)[18F])NC4=C2C=NC=C4
- InChI: InChI=1S/C16H10FN3/c17-16-4-2-11(8-19-16)10-1-3-12-13-9-18-6-5-14(13)20-15(12)7-10/h1-9,20H/i17-1; Key:GETAAWDSFUCLBS-SJPDSGJFSA-N

Flortaucipir (^{18}F), sold under the brand name Tauvid, is a radioactive diagnostic agent indicated for use with positron emission tomography (PET) imaging to image the brain.

The most common adverse reactions include headache, injection site pain and increased blood pressure.

Two proteins – tau and amyloid – are recognized as hallmarks of Alzheimer's disease. In people with Alzheimer's disease, pathological forms of tau proteins develop inside neurons in the brain, creating neurofibrillary tangles. After flortaucipir (^{18}F) is administered intravenously, it binds to sites in the brain associated with this tau protein misfolding. The brain can then be imaged with a PET scan to help identify the presence of tau pathology.

It is the first drug used to help image a distinctive characteristic of Alzheimer's disease in the brain called tau pathology. The US Food and Drug Administration (FDA) considers it to be a first-in-class medication.

== Medical uses ==
Flortaucipir (^{18}F) is a radioactive diagnostic agent for adults with cognitive impairment who are being evaluated for Alzheimer's disease. It is indicated for positron emission tomography (PET) imaging of the brain to estimate the density and distribution of aggregated tau neurofibrillary tangles (NFTs), a primary marker of Alzheimer's disease.

Flortaucipir (^{18}F) is not indicated for use in the evaluation of people for chronic traumatic encephalopathy (CTE).

== Chemistry ==
Chemically, flortaucipir (^{18}F) is 7-(6-[F-18]fluoropyridin-3-yl)-5H-pyrido[4,3 b]indole.

== History ==
Flortaucipir (^{18}F) was discovered by the Siemens biomarker research group, headed by Hartmuth Kolb and Katrin Szardenings, who also conducted first in human trials. Flortaucipir (^{18}F) was approved for medical use in the United States in May 2020.

The safety and effectiveness of flortaucipir (^{18}F) imaging was evaluated in two clinical studies. In each study, five evaluators read and interpreted the flortaucipir (^{18}F) imaging. The evaluators were blinded to clinical information and interpreted the imaging as positive or negative.

The first study enrolled 156 participants who were terminally ill and agreed to undergo flortaucipir (^{18}F) imaging and participate in a post-mortem brain donation program. In 64 of the participants who died within nine months of the flortaucipir (^{18}F) brain scan, evaluators' reading of the flortaucipir (^{18}F) scan was compared to post-mortem readings from independent pathologists who evaluated the density and distribution of neurofibrillary tangles (NFTs) in the same brain. The study showed evaluators reading the flortaucipir (^{18}F) images had a high probability of correctly evaluating participants with tau pathology and had an average-to-high probability of correctly evaluating participants without tau pathology.

The second study included the same participants with terminal illness as the first study, plus 18 additional participants with terminal illness, and 159 participants with cognitive impairment being evaluated for Alzheimer's disease (the indicated patient population). The study gauged how well flortaucipir (^{18}F) evaluators' readings agreed with each other's assessments of the readings. Perfect reader agreement would be 1, while no reader agreement would be 0. In this study, reader agreement was 0.87 across all 241 participants. In a separate subgroup analysis that included the 82 terminally ill participants diagnosed after death and the 159 participants with cognitive impairment, reader agreement was 0.90 for the participants in the indicated population and 0.82 in the terminally ill participants.

The US Food and Drug Administration (FDA) approved flortaucipir (^{18}F) based on evidence of 1921 participants from 19 trials conducted at 322 sites in the United States, Australia, Belgium, Canada, France, Japan, Netherlands and Poland.

The ability of flortaucipir (^{18}F) to detect tau pathology was assessed in participants with generally severe stages of dementia and may be lower in participants in earlier stages of cognitive decline than in the participants with terminal illness who were studied.

== Society and culture ==
=== Legal status ===
The US Food and Drug Administration (FDA) granted the application for flortaucipir (^{18}F) priority review and it granted approval of Tauvid to Avid Radiopharmaceuticals, Inc.

In June 2024, the Committee for Medicinal Products for Human Use (CHMP) of the European Medicines Agency adopted a positive opinion, recommending the granting of a marketing authorization for the medicinal product Tauvid, intended for the diagnosis of Alzheimer's disease. The applicant for this medicinal product is Eli Lilly Nederland B.V. Flortaucipir (^{18}F) was approved for medical use in the European Union in August 2024.

=== Names ===
Flortaucipir (^{18}F) is the international nonproprietary name (INN).
