= Eugene van Tamelen =

American chemist

Eugene Earle van Tamelen
- Born: July 20, 1925; Zeeland, Michigan
- Died: December 12, 2009 (aged 84); Los Altos Hills, California
- Citizenship: United States
- Education: Harvard University
- Scientific career
- Fields: Organic chemistry
- Workplaces: University of Wisconsin, Stanford University
- Thesis: A synthetic approach to cantharidin (1951)
- Doctoral advisor: Gilbert Stork
- Doctoral students: K. Barry Sharpless

Eugene Earle van Tamelen (July 20, 1925 – December 12, 2009) was an organic chemist who is especially recognized for his contributions to bioorganic chemistry.

van Tamelen published five papers while an undergraduate at Hope College. He conducted graduate work at Harvard University, receiving his doctorate in 1950 with Gilbert Stork as his advisor. He began his academic career at the University of Wisconsin, later joining the faculty of Stanford University, where he spent the majority of his career. Among his many students was Nobelist K. Barry Sharpless.

He led a team who were the first persons to achieve the total synthesis of yohimbine. He pioneered in what is today called biomimetic synthesis. He was the first to identify squalene oxide as a precursor in the biosynthesis of cholesterol. Van Tamelen was also the first to synthesise Dewar benzene. He developed a system for nitrogen fixation using titanocene.

van Tamelen was also the owner of the first Marshall Erdman-built Frank Lloyd Wright-designed pre-fabricated house, commonly known as the "Eugene van Tamelen House".

In 1981, van Tamelen became a founding member of the World Cultural Council.

Eugene van Tamelen died of cancer in 2009.

== Awards ==
Among his awards, he received the ACS Award in Pure Chemistry in 1961 and was elected to the US National Academy of Sciences.
