= ClickSeq =

ClickSeq is a click-chemistry based method for generating next generation sequencing libraries for deep-sequencing platforms including Illumina, HiSeq, MiSeq and NextSeq. Its function is similar to most other techniques for generating RNAseq or DNAseq libraries in that it aims to generate random fragments of biological samples of RNA or DNA and append specific sequencing adaptors to either end of every fragment, as per the requirements of the particular sequencing platform to be used (e.g. HiSeq).

In ClickSeq, reverse transcription (RT) reactions are supplemented with small amounts of 3'-azido-nucleotides (AzNTPs) at defined ratios to deoxyribonucleotides (dNTPs). AzNTPs are chain-terminators and therefore induce the stochastic termination of cDNA synthesis at an average length determined by the ratio of AzNTPs to dNTPs. This results in the production of single-stranded cDNA fragments that contain an azido-group at their 3' ends. These 3'-azido-blocked cDNA molecules are purified away from the components of the RT reaction, and subsequently 'click-ligated' to 5' alkyne-modified DNA adaptors via copper-catalysed azide-alkyne cycloaddition (CuAAC). This generates ssDNA molecules with unnatural triazole-linked DNA backbones. Nevertheless, these templates are used in PCR reactions and amplified to generate a cDNA sequencing library with the appropriate 5' and 3' sequencing adapters and indices required for Next-Generation Sequencing. ClickSeq has predominantly been used to sequence viral RNA genomes such as Flock House virus, cricket paralysis virus, and Zika virus, due to its resilience to artifactual chimera formation.

== Poly(A)-ClickSeq ==
Poly(A)-ClickSeq is a variant of ClickSeq designed to target the junction of the three prime untranslated region (UTRs) and poly(A)-tails of the messenger RNAs (mRNAs) of higher-order organisms and of RNA viruses infecting these cells types. The core principle is similar to ClickSeq, however, the reverse-transcription step uses an oligo-dT primer (unanchored) to initiate cDNA synthesis from within the poly(A) tail and only three 3'azido-nucleotides (AzATP, AzGTP and AzCTP, collectively referred to as AzVTPs) are supplemented. Due to the omission of AzTTP, stochastic termination of cDNA synthesis cannot occur during reverse transcription of the poly(A)-tail. Rather, termination can only occur in the 3'UTR at a distance upstream of the poly(A) tail defined by the ratio of AzVTPs to dNTPs.

== Applications ==
ClickSeq and Poly(A)-ClickSeq provide specific applications over other common RNA-seq techniques. These include:

- Removal of RNA fragmentation steps: When the reverse-transcription step is random-primed and cDNA synthesis is terminated by the 3'-azido-nucleotides, cDNA fragments can be generated without chemical, mechanical or enzymatic fragmentation of the sample RNA
- Removal of RNA/DNA ligase enzymes: In ClickSeq, there are no RNA or DNA ligation steps, as are commonly required in most next generation sequencing library synthesis strategies
- Reduction of artifactual recombination: In the original ClickSeq publication, Routh et al. demonstrated that the artifactual generation of cDNA chimeras was substantially reduced when using ClickSeq. This allowed the authors to detect rare RNA recombination events that arise during the replication of Flock House virus.
- Poly(A)-ClickSeq does not require enrichment or purification of mRNA or viral RNAs from biological specimens. Rather, Poly(A)-ClickSeq can be performed in a simple manner directly from crude RNA or total cellular RNA extracted from biological specimens.
- The copper-catalyst required for CuAAC may induce oxidative damage of the template DNA
