= M. G. Finn =

American chemist

M.G. Finn
- Born: October 23, 1958 (age 67); Atlantic City, New Jersey, U.S.
- Education: California Institute of Technology (BS); Massachusetts Institute of Technology (PhD)
- Known for: Click chemistry
- Awards: 2012 Humboldt Research Award; 2017 Arthur C. Cope Scholar Award
- Scientific career
- Fields: Chemistry
- Workplaces: University of Virginia; Scripps Research Institute; Georgia Tech
- Thesis: On the mechanism of titanium-tartrate catalyzed asymmetric epoxidation (1986)
- Doctoral advisor: Barry Sharpless
- Other academic advisors: Fred C. Anson; James P. Collman
- Website: www.finnlabresearch.org

M.G. Finn (born October 23, 1958) is an American chemist and a Regents' professor at the Georgia Institute of Technology.

== Early life and education ==
Finn was born in Atlantic City, New Jersey, on October 23, 1958. He studied chemistry at California Institute of Technology while receiving a Eastman Kodak scholarship and performing undergraduate research under the direction of electrochemist Fred C. Anson. After receiving his Bachelor of Science degree in June 1980, Finn spent the summer performing research at Eastman Kodak in Rochester, New York before joining the group of future Nobel prize winner, Barry Sharpless, that fall at the Massachusetts Institute of Technology, where he gained his PhD in 1986 with his thesis "On the mechanism of titanium-tartrate catalyzed asymmetric epoxidation".

== Career ==
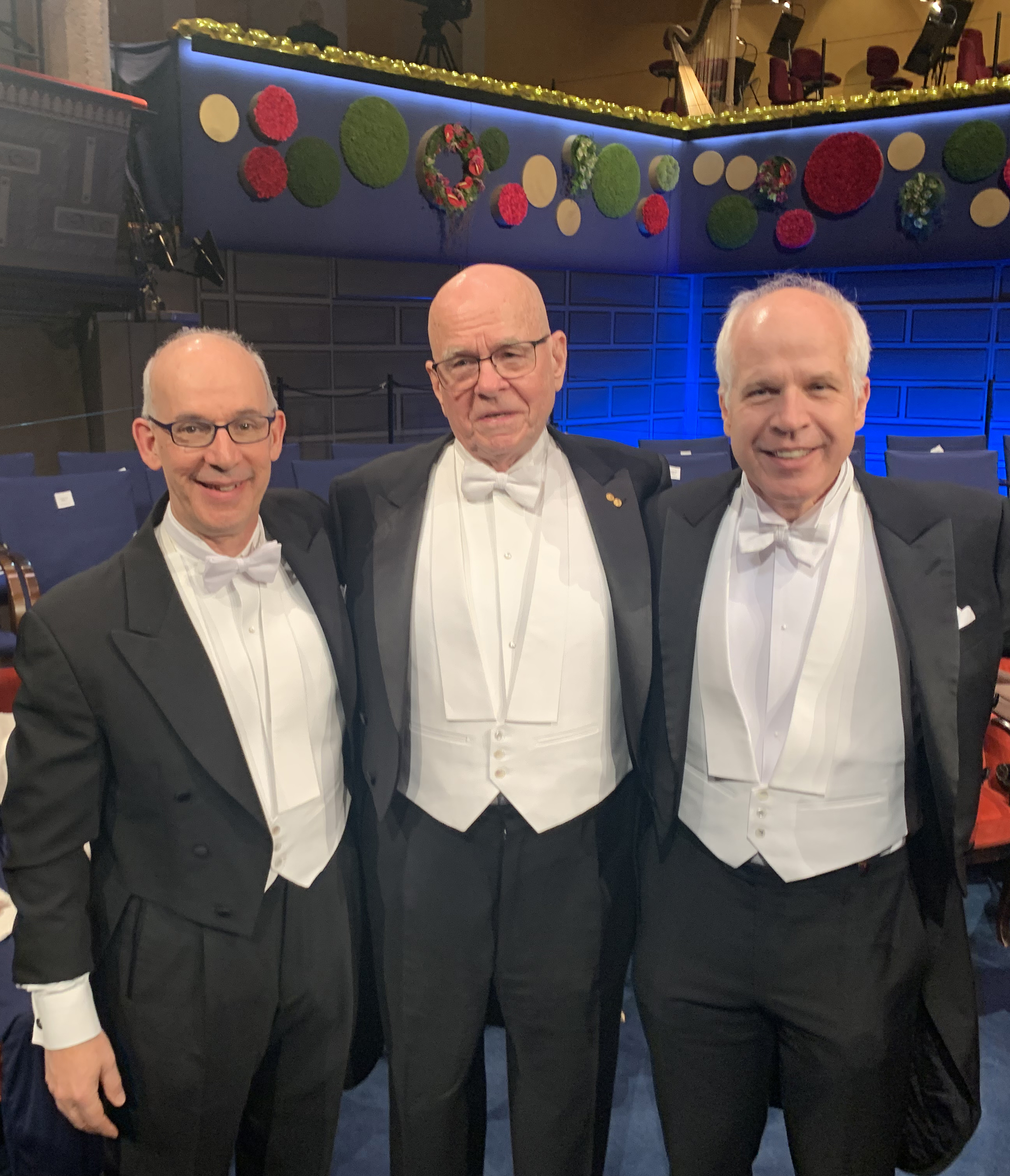
Finn (left) with click chemistry collaborators Barry Sharpless (center) and Hartmuth C. Kolb (right) at the 2022 Nobel awards ceremony

After receiving his doctorate, Finn carried out postdoctoral research for two years with James P. Collman at Stanford University, before joining the faculty of University of Virginia in 1988. He moved to the Scripps Research Institute in 1998 (where his former PhD supervisor Barry Sharpless had previously moved to in 1990) and later to Georgia Tech in 2013, where he currently holds the James A. Carlos Family Chair for Pediatric Technology, and is chief scientific officer of the Children's healthcare of Atlanta Pediatric Technology Center.

Finn's research concentrates on the development of methods for the synthesis of biologically-important molecules, such as functional virus-like particles. He coined the term Click chemistry with Barry Sharpless and Hartmuth C. Kolb. He also works on the mechanism and optimisation of copper-catalysed azide-alkyl cycloaddition; on targeted synthesis of enzyme inhibitors and antivirals; on bio-conjugation and chemical materials science; on the immunology of carbohydrates; and with new methods of enzyme development.

His laboratory works with viruses as building-blocks for targeted development of biologically active molecules.

Finn became the Editor-in-Chief of ACS Combinatorial Science in 2010.

Finn served as chair of the School of Chemistry and Biochemistry from 2013 until 2024.

In 2025, Finn was appointed Regents' Professor in the College of Sciences.

In 2013, Thomson Reuters suggested that Finn could potentially win a Nobel prize for his ground-breaking work on click chemistry.

== Awards ==
- 2011 Scripps Research Institute Outstanding Mentor Award
- 2012 Humboldt Research Award
- 2017 Arthur C. Cope Scholar Award

== Personal life ==
Finn's full first name is M.G. He and his wife, Beth, have two children, Allison and Marc.

== Selected publications ==
- Kolb, Hartmuth C.; Finn, M.G.; Sharpless, K. Barry (2001). "Click Chemistry: Diverse Chemical Function from a Few Good Reactions". Angewandte Chemie. 40 (11): 2004–2021. doi:10.1002/1521-3773(20010601)40:11<2004::AID-ANIE2004>3.0.CO;2-5.
