= AIV fodder =

Acidic silage

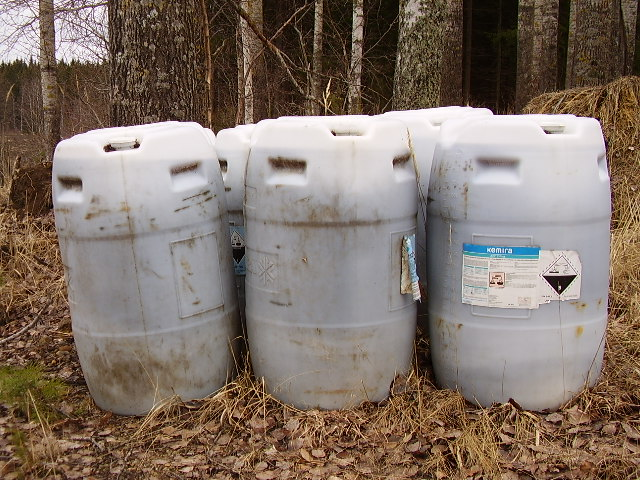
AIV-canisters containing formic acid waiting to be used.

AIV fodder is a kind of silage. The AIV liquid is added to the green fodder to improve the storage. This is especially important during long winters. The process includes adding a dilute hydrochloric or sulfuric acid to newly stored grain. Increased acidity stops harmful fermentation and has no adverse effect on the nutritive value of the fodder or the animals it is fed to.

A Finnish researcher of chemistry and agriculture Artturi Virtanen invented the method and named it after his initials (Artturi Ilmari Virtanen). First commercial AIV fodder products were introduced in 1929 and the method was patented in 1932. In 1945 Virtanen became a Nobel Prize laureate in chemistry "for his research and inventions in agricultural and nutrition chemistry, especially for his fodder preservation method" (AIV fodder).

Modern version of the AIV liquid consist of 76% formic acid, 5.5% ammonium formate, and 18.5% water. The liquid is strongly acidic, thus care is needed in the handling of the liquid.

In the early days the green fodder was dropped into a hole dug into the ground and the AIV liquid was poured on top of it. Today AIV fodder is created automatically by the harvesting machinery. During the process the liquid is added to the green fodder. 3000 kg of green fodder requires about 5 liters of AIV liquid. The ready AIV fodder may irritate skin but is not dangerous to the animals it is fed to or humans.
