= Morten P. Meldal =

Danish chemist (born 1954)

Morten Meldal
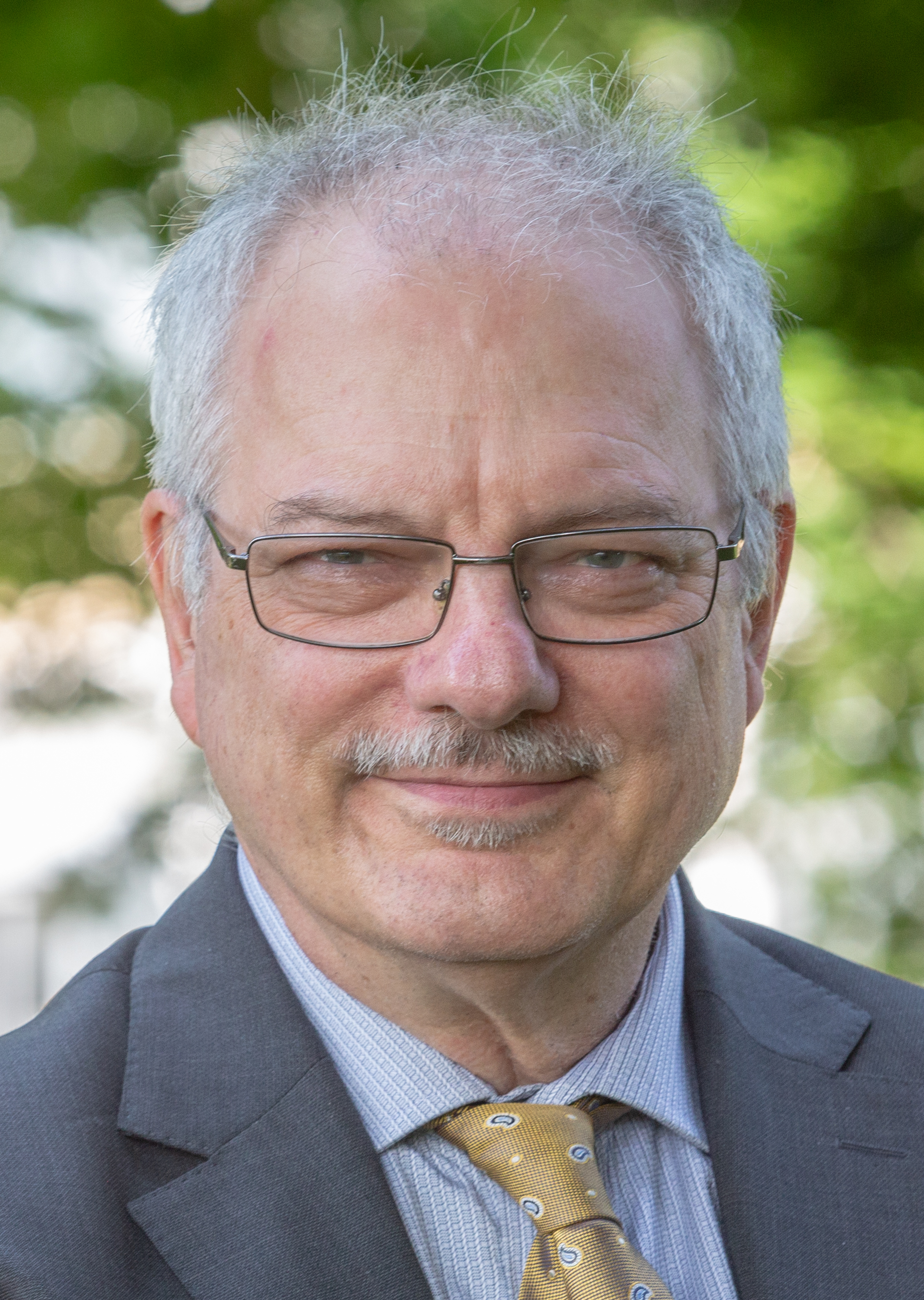
- Meldal in 2023
- Born: Morten Peter Meldal; 16 January 1954 (age 72); Denmark
- Education: Technical University of Denmark (BS, MS, PhD)
- Awards: Nobel Prize in Chemistry (2022)
- Scientific career
- Fields: Organic chemistry
- Workplaces: Technical University of Denmark; University of Cambridge; Carlsberg Laboratory; University of Copenhagen; MRC Laboratory of Molecular Biology
- Thesis: Reactions of Unsaturated Sugars with Hydrogen Halides (1983)
- Doctoral advisor: Klaus Bock

Morten Peter Meldal (born 16 January 1954) is a Danish chemist and Nobel laureate. He is a professor of chemistry at the University of Copenhagen in Copenhagen, Denmark. He is best known for developing the CuAAC-click reaction, concurrently with but independent of Valery V. Fokin and K. Barry Sharpless.

== Biography ==
Meldal received B.S. and PhD degrees in chemical engineering from Technical University of Denmark (DTU); his PhD work was supervised by Klaus Bock and focused on the synthetic chemistry of carbohydrates. From 1983 to 1988 he was a postdoctoral fellow in organic chemistry, first at the DTU, next at the MRC Laboratory of Molecular Biology at Cambridge University and then at the University of Copenhagen. In 1996 he was appointed assistant professor at DTU. Since 1998 he has led the synthesis group in the Department of Chemistry of the Carlsberg Laboratory.

Meldal developed several techniques and instruments for peptide synthesis near the start of his career. He developed the multiple-column synthesis used in peptide and organic synthesis instruments, as well as for assembling large split-mix libraries. He first presented the cycloaddition of acetylenes and azides used in peptide and protein conjugations, in polymers and in material sciences. Meldal's group then showed this reaction to be orthogonal to the majority of functional group chemistries.

More recently Meldal has developed an optical encoding technique and has focused on the merger of organic chemistry and peptide chemistry on solid support. He has devised a range of novel methods for the generation of N-acyl iminium ions in which combinatorial libraries of these compounds are generated and screened for substances with activity toward G protein-coupled receptors in cell-based on-bead screening.

In 2019, Meldal co-founded the company Betamab Therapeutics ApS, based on the concept of beta-bodies, i.e. peptide mimics of antibodies. The company closed in 2021.

Through his daughter Anna, his son-in-law is musician Kevin Shields.

== Honors and awards ==
Meldal was awarded the 2022 Nobel Prize in Chemistry, jointly with Carolyn R. Bertozzi and Karl Barry Sharpless, "for the development of click chemistry and bioorthogonal chemistry".
