= Boolarra virus =

Virus classification
- (unranked): Virus
- Realm: Riboviria
- Kingdom: Orthornavirae
- Phylum: Kitrinoviricota
- Class: Magsaviricetes
- Order: Nodamuvirales
- Family: Nodaviridae
- Genus: Alphanodavirus
- Species: Alphanodavirus boolarraense

Species of virus

Boolarra virus (BoV) is a member of the family Nodaviridae. It was named after Boolarra, Victoria where it was first discovered after infecting and killing or severely debilitating a pest larvae. As of now, the only known host for Boolarra virus is the Oncopera intricoides which a moth that is endemic to Victoria (Australia).

== History and discovery ==
In the winter of 1977, an outbreak of Oncopera intricoides prompted examination of the insect and its habits. While examining the pest, many dead and terminal larvae were found. After looking closely to discover the cause these insects' ailment, researchers were unable to find any traces of bacteria, fungi, or protozoa that could have contributed to the insects' death. After further examination, the researchers found viral particles that were found to be members of the Nodaviridae. After comparing the RNA genome of this virus with that of other members of the Nodaviridae, it was found to be different and therefore a new member of the Nodaviridae. After this discovery, the virus was named after the place where the infected Oncopera intricoides were found; Boolarra, Victoria.

== Physical data ==
Boolarra virus typically measures around 30 nano-meters and is approximately 21 percent RNA. Boolarra virus is characterized by its polyhedral shape. The virus only shares a significant portion of the same amino acid sequence with the Nodamura virus, which is a similar Nodavirus. Among other Nodoviruses, Boolarra was not very similar concerning amino acid sequences. Still a very rare virus, Boolarra virus can only be found in a very small population of moths that is endemic to the region of Victoria, Australia. While only found within this small population, the virus causes severe harm to occur to infected larvae and can even cause death.
