= Black beetle virus =

Virus classification
- (unranked): Virus
- Realm: Riboviria
- Kingdom: Orthornavirae
- Phylum: Kitrinoviricota
- Class: Magsaviricetes
- Order: Nodamuvirales
- Family: Nodaviridae
- Genus: Alphanodavirus
- Species: Alphanodavirus heteronychi

Species of virus

Black beetle virus (BBV) is a virus that was initially discovered in the North Island of New Zealand in Helensville in dead New Zealand black beetles (Heteronychus arator) in 1975.

== History and general information ==
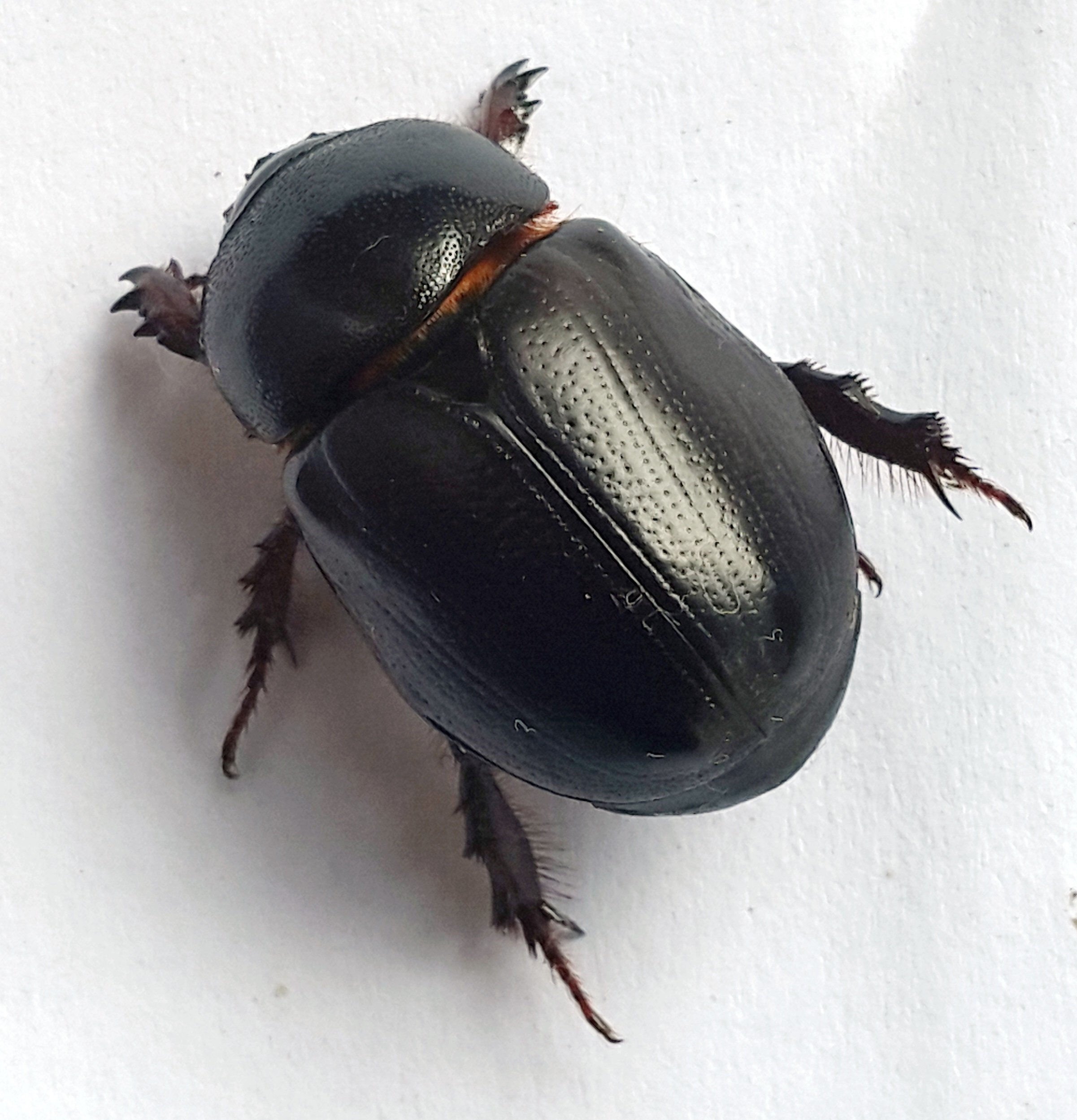
Heteronychus arator African black beetle

BBV is recognized as a member of a group of small split arboviruses from the same line as Nodamura virus which was discovered 20 years prior to BBV in Japan. The genomes of these viruses are unusually small compared to others such as picorna and retroviruses. Because the virus only has 2 initial RNAs, this is the simplest class of virus. There is an RNA 3 that does appear only in infected cells. BBV has only been shown to infect insect cells. When transmitted to wax moth larvae, it can cause paralysis; however it cannot replicate in mammalian cells like other viruses in its family. Viruses such as Nodamura Virus and Flock house virus have been shown to infect mammals and fishes. BBV comes from the family of Nodaviridae that contains nine different viruses divided into two different sub groups: Alphanodavirus and Betanodavirus. BBV falls into the Alphanodavirus group along with Nodavirus. These viruses are non-enveloped, with icosahedral geometries, and T=3 symmetry. Their diameter is typically around 30 nm with BBV's being 32.4 nm. The virus genomes are linear and segmented, bipartite, around 21.4kb in length as well. Alphanodaviruses life cycles begin with penetration into the host cell. Once in the cytoplasm, RNA is transcribed within envagininations of the host cell using its own RNA dependent polymerase. To release, the virus causes lysis of the host cell from which copies of newly made virus are released.

== Viral classification ==
BBV is a (+)ssRNA virus from the family Nodaviridae and of the genus Alphanodavirus. Each member of the family Nodaviridae is classified as either an alpha (infecting insects) or beta-nodavirus (infecting fish) with BBV being an alphanodavirus.

== Viral structure ==
The structure of BBV is similar to the other viruses in its family. BBV is made of a non-enveloped virion that has a diameter of approximately 32.4 nm. The virion is made up of 180 copies of a single viral coating protein. The virion is organized in T=3 icosahedral symmetry, meaning there are 60 triangular subunits each made up of 3 viral capsid proteins. The virion contains both RNA1 and RNA2 inside of it, but RNA3 is not included into the virion and is transcribed after infection of a host cell. RNA3 is not necessary for replication, however it is coded for with RNA1 making it always synthesized.

== Viral genome ==
The BBV insect virus genome is made of two mRNA molecules encapsidated in a single virion. The nucleotide sequence of BBV RNA1 is 3015 bases long, this along with RNA2's 1399 base pairs completes the viral genome. The genome of BBV and other viruses in its family are incredibly small, nearly half the size of picornaviruses, making it the smallest class of virus with a segmented genome. The RNA1 sequence contains a 5' region of 38 nucleotides with no coding role. It also contains a coding region for protein A, which is used in RNA synthesis. A 3' proximal region encoding RNA3 (389 bases) is also overlapped within the RNA1 sequence. RNA3 is a subgenomic messenger RNA made in infected cells but not encapsidated into the original virions. The RNA3 sequence begins inside the coding region of protein A and also forms protein B from its own frames. RNA1 and RNA2 seem to be fairly independent of each other, except for their ability to bond when forming the capsid. RNA2 is also found to suppress the function of RNA3, which could be a marker to begin capsid construction.

== Viral replication ==
The genome and viral messenger for (+)ssRNA noroviridae viruses is the initial virion RNA. RNA1 sequence encodes for the virus' RNA-dependand RNA polymerase which is protein A. Thee virion also contains code for RNA2 which forms a precursor protein for capsid formation. RNA3 is also formed in infected cells from RNA1 sequence, and is inhibited by RNA2 though independently coded. RNA3 encodes for proteins B! and B2. B1 is used as the end terminal for RNA replicase, but the function is to totally clear. B2 is a separate unique protein which also has an unknown use. When tested, neither B1 or B2 was necessary for replication, however the new genotypes did not match exactly with the wild type.

=== Cell entry ===
The virus will first enter the cell via penetration of the membrane. Once in the cell, the virus uncoats itself and releases the genomic RNA into the cytoplasm of the cell. Typically, Nodaviridae will form an invagination within the membrane of the host cell mitochondria where it will prepare to replicate.

=== Replication and transcription ===
Once set in the invagination, RNA1 is transcribed, thus allowing for the RNA-dependent polymerase to be synthesized. The space occupied by the virus is then known as a cytoplasmic viral factory in which the virus uses the host cell machinery to continue replication of RNA strands that will then be turned into dsRNA. The dsRNA is then finally transcribed or replicated into either viral mRNA or more ssRNA to be replicated again.

=== Viral assembly and release ===
Once RNA2 is synthesized, the virus then prepares for assembly. When the ratio of ribosomes to N proteins becomes favorable to switch to capsid formation, the virus spontaneously assembles around RNA1 and RNA2 into an icosahedral capsid leaving the previously synthesized RNA3 outside of the capsid. Once Capsid maturation occurs via autoproteolytic cleavage of capsid protein alpha, capsid protein beta and peptide gamma are formed. Peptide gamma is assumed to be released in the endosome where it disrupts the endosomal membrane allowing the new viral RNA to be released into the cytoplasm of the cell creating the new infected cell.

== Host interaction ==
Although BBV has been shown to infect multiple types of insect cells, it has only been seen in the wild to infect Heteronychus arator - the New Zealand black beetle. The virus is able to kill the host organism, and plays a key role in suppressing the population of black beetles when they verge on overpopulating.
