= Feline zoonosis =

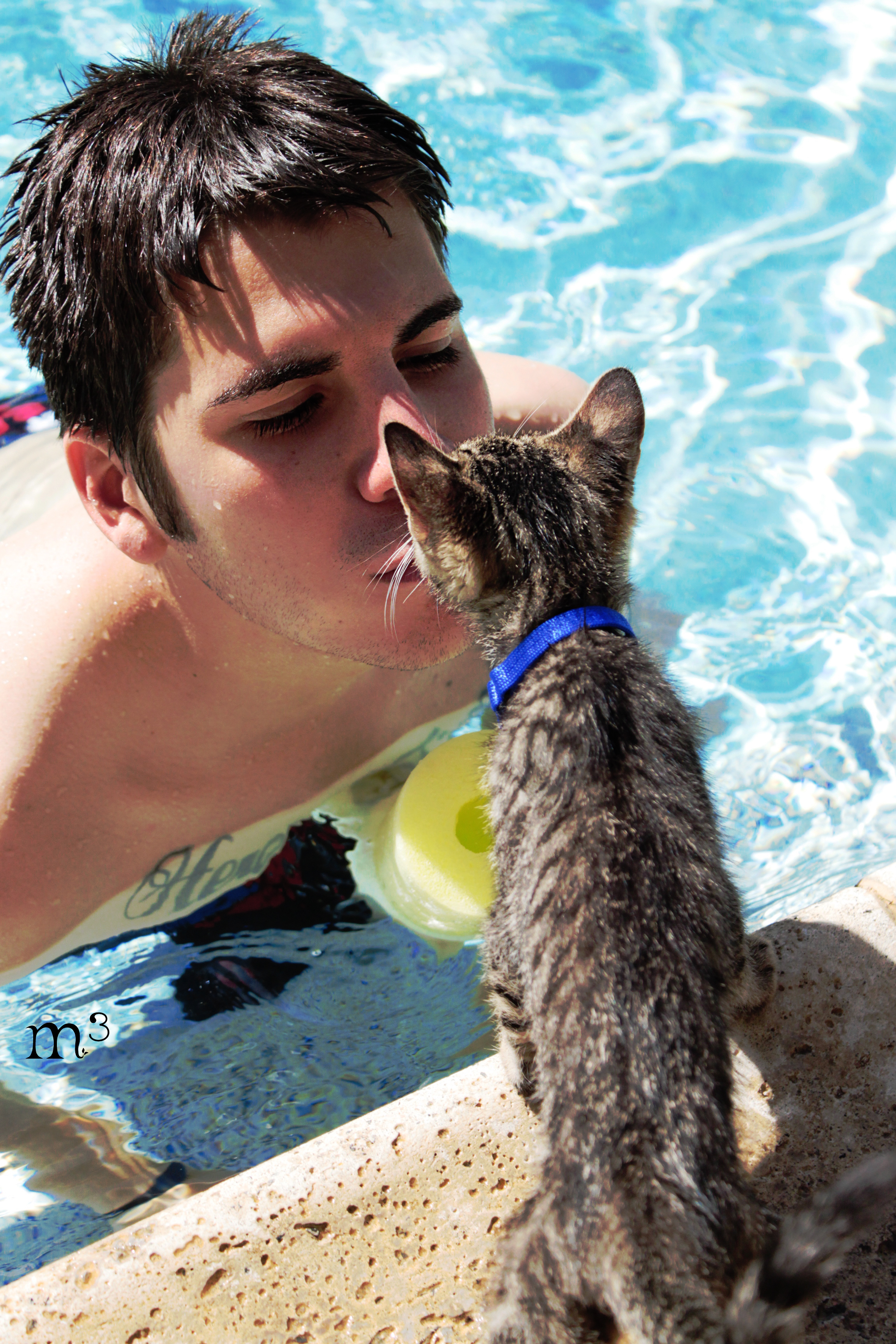
- Specialty: Infectious disease, veterinary medicine

A feline zoonosis is a viral, bacterial, fungal, protozoan, nematode or arthropod infection that can be transmitted to humans from the domesticated cat, Felis catus. Some of these diseases are reemerging and newly emerging infections or infestations caused by zoonotic pathogens transmitted by cats. In some instances, the cat can display symptoms of infection (these may differ from the symptoms in humans) and sometimes the cat remains asymptomatic. There can be serious illnesses and clinical manifestations in people who become infected. This is dependent on the immune status and age of the person. Those who live in close association with cats are more prone to these infections, but those that do not keep cats as pets can also acquire these infections as the transmission can be from cat feces and the parasites that leave their bodies.

People can acquire cat-associated infections through bites, scratches or other direct contact of the skin or mucous membranes with the cat. This includes 'kissing' or letting the animal lick the mouth or nose. Mucous membranes are easily infected when the pathogen is in the mouth of the cat. Pathogens can also infect people when there is contact with animal saliva, urine and other body fluids or secretions. When fecal material is unintentionally ingested, infection can occur. A feline zoonosis can be acquired by a person by inhalation of aerosols or droplets coughed up by the cat.

In the United States, thirty-two percent of homes have at least one cat. Some contagious infections such as campylobacteriosis and salmonellosis cause visible symptoms of the disease in cats. Other infections, such as cat scratch disease and toxoplasmosis, have no visible symptoms and are carried by apparently healthy cats.

== Cats as vectors ==
Some disease-carrying arthropods use cats as a vector, or carrier. Fleas and ticks can carry pathogenic organisms that infect a person with Lyme disease, tick-borne encephalitis, and Rocky mountain spotted fever.

== Bites ==
Statistics generated by the state of Ohio document that cat bites make up about 20 percent of all animal bites each year. Bites from cats can not only transmit serious diseases such as rabies, but bites can develop bacterial infections. The bite of a cat appears small but it can be deep. As many as 80 percent of cat bites become infected.

== Viral ==
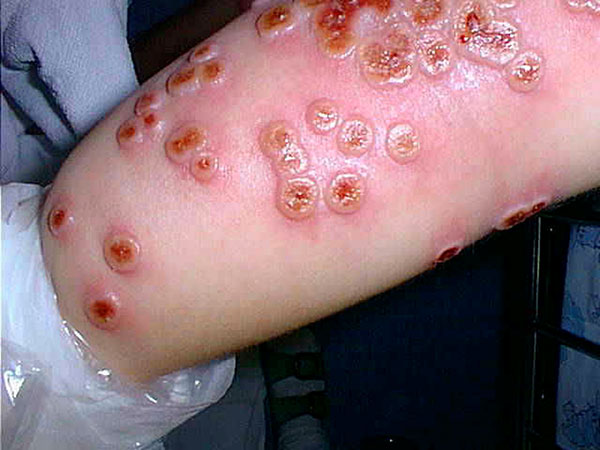
Cowpox infection

In 2010, over 400 cases of cowpox infection from cats to human have been described. The symptoms differ between both humans and cats. In people, local exanthema appears on the arms and face. The infection resolves on its own but those who are immunosuppressed can progress to systemic infection that closely resembles smallpox. When the infection has expanded to severe symptoms, it can be lethal. The signs of cowpox infection in cats can be seen as, multiple skin sores on the paws, neck, head and mouth. The cat can also develop a purulent discharge from the eyes. Necrotizing pneumonia has also been observed. Estimates that 50% of human cases of cowpox are due to transmission from cats in the United Kingdom.

The avian flu virus H7N2 has been found in cats in New York City. Though transmission to people is possible, it is thought to be rare. In Europe, cats were identified as being hosts for West Nile virus.

== Bacterial ==
=== Pasteurella multocida ===
The bacterium Pasteurella multocida and its genus can pose a risk of severe diseases in high-risk groups such as the elderly, transplant recipients, cancer patients and immunocompromised individuals. Transmission of the infection to the human from the cat has been attributed to kissing the cat, providing care that exposes the person to the body fluids of the cat and sleeping with the cat.

=== Capnocytophaga canimorsus ===
The bacterium Capnocytophaga canimorsus can pose a risk of severe diseases in high-risk groups such as the elderly, transplant recipients, cancer patients and immunocompromised individuals. Transmission of the infection to the human from the cat has been attributed to kissing the cat, providing care that exposes the person to the body fluids of the cat and sleeping with the cat. Kittens are more likely to transmit the bacterium than adult cats. Exposure to cats with this infection has been associated with meningitis. Capnocytophaga canimorsus sepsis has also been associated with infection in cat owners.

=== Methicillin-resistant Staphylococcus aureus ===
Methicillin-resistant Staphylococcus aureus (MRSA) is a common type of bacteria that is normally found on the skin of people and cats. MRSA is the same bacterium that has become resistant to some antibiotics. Cats and other animals often can carry MRSA without being sick, but MRSA can cause a variety of infections, including of the skin, respiratory tract, and urinary tract of people. MRSA can be transmitted back and forth between people and animals through direct contact. In people, MRSA most often causes skin infections that can range from mild to severe. If left untreated, MRSA can spread to the bloodstream or lungs and cause life-threatening infections.

=== Plague ===
Cats are known to transmit plague. Plague can take three forms: bubonic plague, primary septicemic plague, and primary pneumonic plague.

=== Chagas disease ===
Transmission of Chagas disease has been documented and is associated with sleeping with cats.

=== Leishmaniasis ===
Leishmaniasis is a newly emerging pathogen in Texas.

=== Staphylococcus intermedius ===
The Staphylococcus intermedius bacteria, a common commensal on cats, is associated with infection in humans.

=== Leptospirosis ===
Leptospirosis infection associated with cat urine has been identified as an emerging bacterial pathogen in some European countries. In infected humans, jaundice may or may not be a symptom. If jaundice is a symptom the infection becomes more severe and rapidly progresses.

=== Tuberculosis and influenza ===
Different strains of the tuberculosis bacterium (Mycobacterium bovis, M. tuberculosis and M. microti) have been isolated from cats and associated with infection with the presence of the bacterium in their owners, but a definitive cause has not been established. Neither has one strain of influenza been proven to infect pet owners, though infected cats can infect other cats.

=== Kennel cough ===
Bordetella bronchiseptica has been identified in cats with owners that also are infected with this pathogen. Individuals having this infection have usually been cancer or transplant patients. Those with this infection can develop serious pneumonia.

== Echinococcosis ==
Echinococcus multilocularis can infect cats and then be transmitted to their owners to cause human alveolar echinococcosis. Foxes have transmitted this pathogen to cats in Germany, Austria, France and Japan.

== Arthropods ==
Cheyletiellosis (also known as Cheyletiella dermatitis) is a mild, short-term skin inflammation caused by the mite Cheyletiella blakei that feeds on a person's skin cells. It is spread through contact with infested cats. Cheyletiella blakei infection has been associated with sleeping with a cat. Though not a common ectoparasite, it may be an emerging pathogen in California. The infected cat may have no signs of infection. However, affected kittens may have patches of scaly skin with dandruff. The most common symptoms of cheyletiellosis in people include itching, redness, and raised bumps on areas of the skin that touched the infested animal. Cheyletiellosis in people generally resolves on its own.

== Fungi ==
Cats are reservoirs and are able to transmit mycotic infections. Cats, especially kittens, can pass on a ringworm infection to people. Ringworm is a fungal disease and approximately 40 types of fungi can cause ringworm. They are typically of the Trichophyton, Microsporum, or Epidermophyton type. It gets its name from the characteristic ring-like rash on the skin. The disease is spread by touching an infected cat. The rash may be scaly, reddened, and circular. Ringworm on the scalp usually makes a bald patch of scaly skin. Long-haired cats do not always show signs of ringworm infection. Kittens with ringworm have patches that are hairless, circular, or irregularly shaped areas of scaling, crusting, and redness that may or may not be itchy. The area may not be completely hairless, and instead have brittle, broken hairs. If the claws are affected, they may have a whitish, opaque appearance with shredding of the claw's surface.

Sporotrichosis is a fungal disease that is transmitted by mostly outdoor cats.

== Platyhelminthes ==
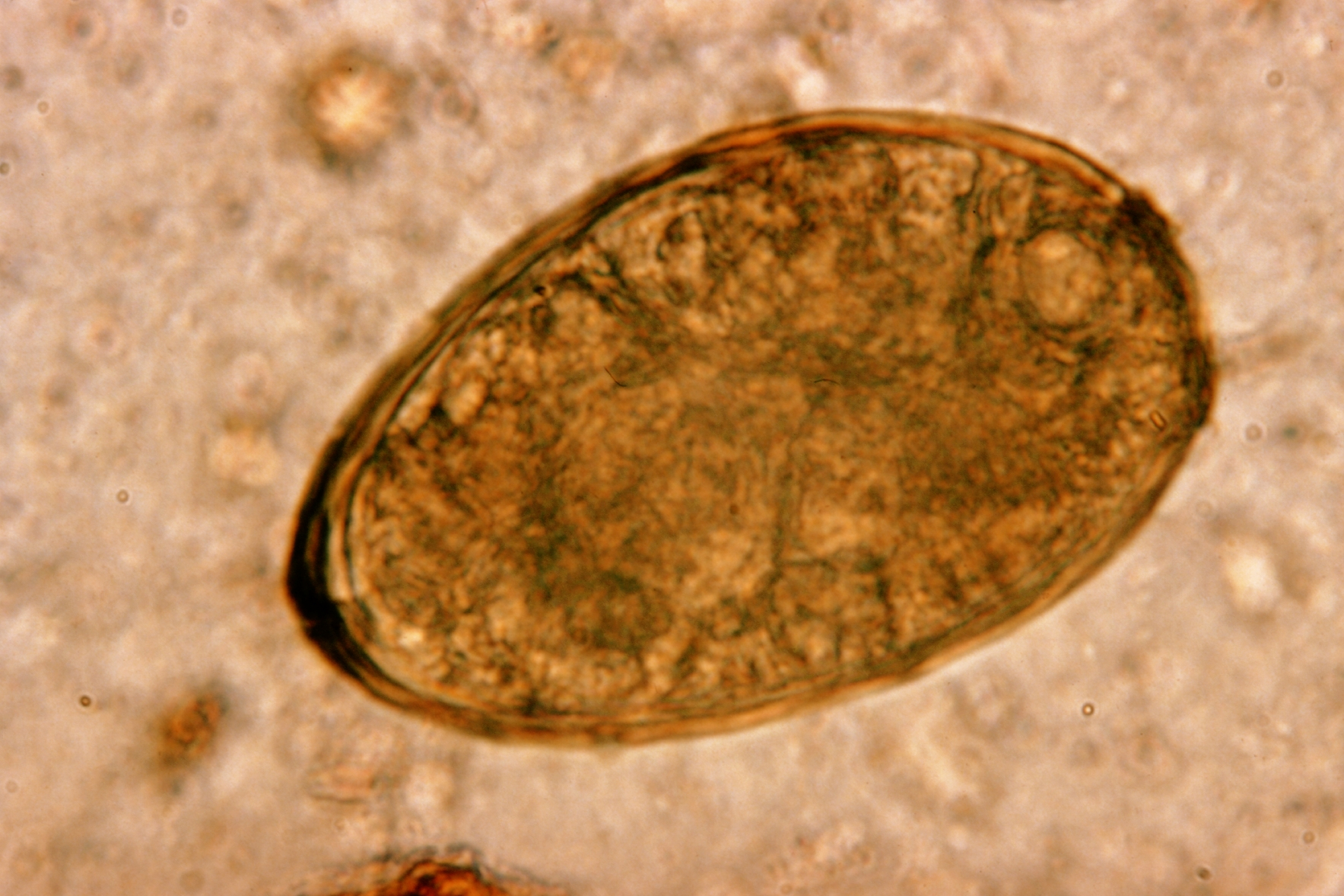
The lung fluke Paragonimus westermani

Paragonimiasis, or lung fluke uses cats as a reservoir and subsequently can transmit the infection to humans. Symptoms in cats have not been observed. There are over nine species of lung flukes that can be transmitted to humans from cats. The disease has been found in Asia, Africa, India, North, South and Central America. It is not uncommon and estimates of those infected are in the millions. Signs symptoms in humans are coughing up blood, migration of the flukes into other body organs including the central nervous system. There it can cause neurological symptoms such as headache, confusion, convulsions, vision problems, and bleeding in the brain. This infection in humans is sometimes mistaken for tuberculosis.

Onchocercosis has been associated with pet cats in a few cases.

Cats can harbor and transmit hookworms to people.

== Protozoans ==
Cryptosporidiosis (Cryptosporidium spp.) is a parasitic disease that is transmitted through contaminated food or water from an infected person or animal. Cryptosporidiosis in cats is rare, but they can carry the protozoan without showing any signs of illness. Cryptosporidiosis can cause profuse, watery diarrhea with cramping, abdominal pain, and nausea in people. Illness in people is usually self-limiting and lasts only 2–4 days, but can become severe in people with weakened immune systems. Cats transmit the protozoan through their feces. The symptoms in people weight loss and chronic diarrhea in high-risk patients. More than one species of this genus can be acquired by people. Dogs can also transmit this parasite.

Another important protozoan disease associated with cats is Toxoplasma gondii, for which cats act as the definitive reservoir. Infected cats shed oocysts in their faeces, which upon ingestion can infect an individual. Pregnant women are especially at risk as it is associated with miscarriage, hydrocephalus of the newborn, or other symptoms.

== Prevention ==
One strategy for the prevention of infection transmission between cats and people is to better educate people on the behaviour that puts them at risk for becoming infected.

Those at the highest risk of contracting a disease from a cat are those with behaviors that include: being licked, sharing food, sharing kitchen utensils, kissing, and sleeping with a cat. The very young, the elderly and those who are immunocompromised increase their risk of becoming infected when sleeping with their cats (and dogs). The CDC recommends that cat owners not allow a cat to lick your face because it can result in disease transmission. If someone is licked on their face, mucous membranes or an open wound, the risk for infection is reduced if the area is immediately washed with soap and water. Maintaining the health of the animal by regular inspection for fleas and ticks, scheduling deworming medications along with veterinary exams will also reduce the risk of acquiring a feline zoonosis.

Recommendations for the prevention of ringworm transmission to people include:

- regularly vacuuming areas of the home that pets commonly visit helps to remove fur or flakes of skin
- washing the hands with soap and running water after playing with or petting your pet.
- wearing gloves and long sleeves when handling cats infected with.
- disinfect areas the pet has spent time in, including surfaces and bedding.
  - the spores of this fungus can be killed with common disinfectants like chlorine bleach diluted 1:10, benzalkonium chloride, or strong detergents.
- not handling cats with ringworm by those whose immune system is weak in any way (if you have HIV/AIDS, are undergoing cancer treatment, or are taking medications that suppress the immune system, for example).
- taking the cat to the veterinarian if ringworm infection is suspected.

== See also ==
- Cat bite
- Cross-species transmission
- Emerging infectious disease
- Veterinary medicine

== Bibliography ==
- Heymann, David (2015). Control of communicable diseases manual : an official report of the American Public Health Association. Washington, DC: APHA Press. ISBN 9780875530185. An imprint of the American Public Health Association.
