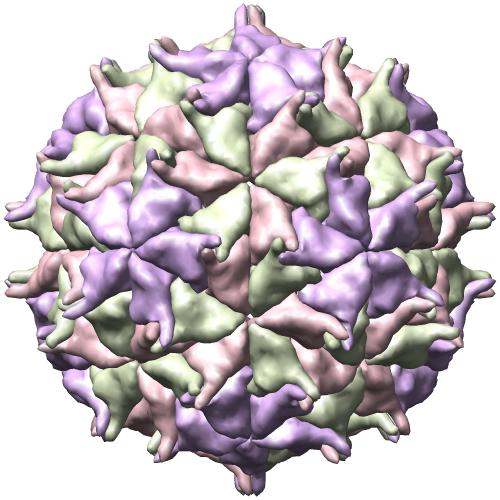
- Structure of Nodamura virus

Virus classification
- (unranked): Virus
- Realm: Riboviria
- Kingdom: Orthornavirae
- Phylum: Kitrinoviricota
- Class: Magsaviricetes
- Order: Nodamuvirales
- Family: Nodaviridae
- Genus: Alphanodavirus
- Species: Alphanodavirus nodamuraense

= Nodamura virus =

Species of virus

Nodamura virus (NoV) is a member of the family Nodaviridae, which was originally isolated from mosquitoes (Culex tritaeniorhynchus) in Japan near the village of Nodamura in 1956. Other members of Nodaviridae are flock house virus (FHV) and black beetle virus (BBV). NoV has been found to multiply in several insect and tick species; however, these infected individuals seem to be asymptomatic. Nodamura virus is the only member of the genus Alphanodavirus that can infect insects, fish, and mammals.

== Taxonomy ==
Nodamura virus is a +ssRNA virus. It is a member of the virus family Nodaviridae. Nodaviridae is made up of two genera, Alphanodavirus and Betanodavirus. NoV is a member of the Alphanodavirus. Other viruses in this genus are Flock House virus and Black beetle virus.

== Structure ==
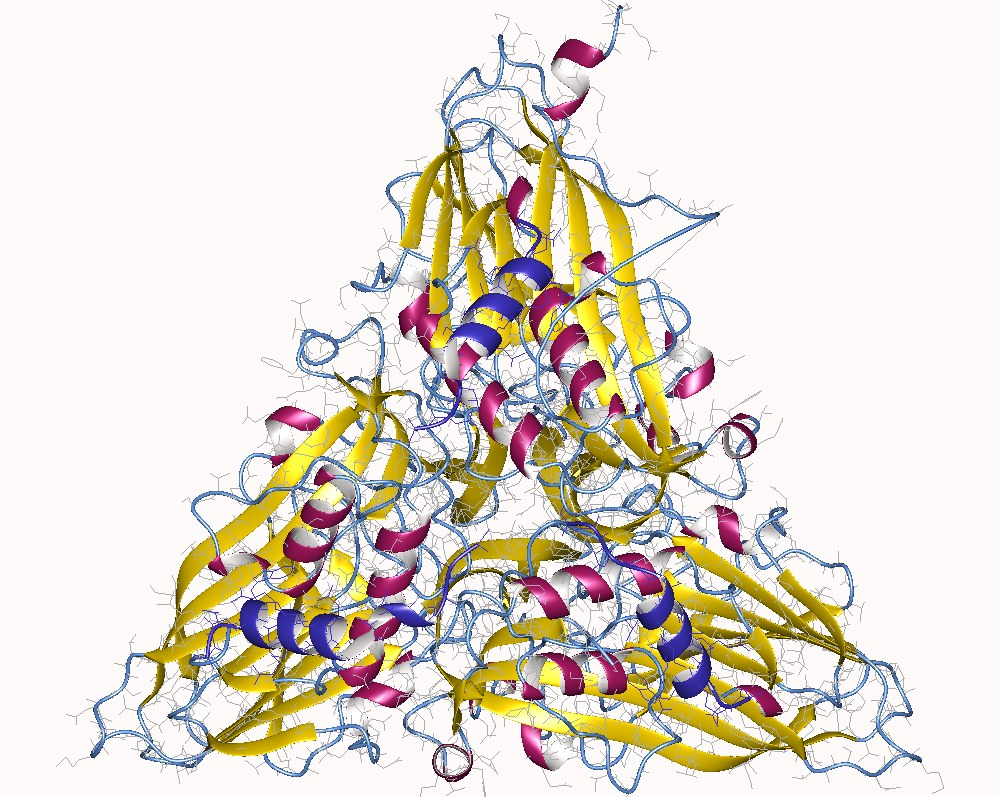
Nodamura virus coat protein trimer.

The structure of nodamura virus is consistent with the structure of other viruses in the family Nodaviridae. These viruses contain a non-enveloped virion that has a diameter of approximately 30 nm. The virion is made up of 180 copies of a single viral capsid protein. The virion is organized in T=3 icosahedral symmetry, which means there are 60 triangular subunits each made up of 3 viral capsid proteins. The virion contains both RNA1 and RNA2, but RNA3 is not included into the virion and is transcribed after infection of a host cell. RNA1 and RNA2 are required for successful infectivity of nodamura virus.

== Genome ==
Nodamura virus capsid contains a segmented RNA genome made up of RNA1 and RNA2. RNA1 is responsible for encoding protein A, which is the RNA dependent RNA polymerase. RNA dependent RNA polymerase is necessary for replication of the nodamura virus genome. RNA1 is approximately 3.2 kb in length. RNA2 encodes the viral capsid protein, alpha. RNA2 is approximately 1.3 kb in length. RNA1's Protein A is also responsible for the synthesis of RNA3, which is synthesized from RNA1. In NoV, RNA3 is responsible for the translation of proteins B2-137, B2-134, and B1. Studies have shown that B2 proteins help to repress an antiviral response in nodamura infected cells.

== Replication cycle ==
=== Entry ===
Virus penetrates into the host cell. Uncoating, and release of the viral genomic RNA into the cytoplasm. Specific mechanisms of viral attachment to host cell and entry into the host cell are currently unknown. No specific receptor has been identified.

=== Replication ===
Replication of Nodamura virus, a +ssRNA virus, occurs in the cytoplasm of cells. Once the virus has entered the host cell, the virus is uncoated and the viral RNA is released into the cytoplasm. The viral RNA-1 is then translated to produce the RdRp protein. Replication then begins in cytoplasmic viral factories. A dsRNA genome is synthesized from the genomic ssRNA(+) and further transcribed providing viral mRNAs/new ssRNA(+) genomes. The subgenomic RNA-3 is then transcribed along with the RNA-2, which encodes capsid protein alpha.

=== Assembly and release ===
Virus assembly in the cytoplasm around genomic RNA1 and RNA2. Assembled capsid protein alpha is cleaved into capsid protein beta and gamma. Release of infectious particles.

=== Modulation of host processes ===
The nodamura virus protein B2 (encoded by RNA3) has been shown to modulate the host process of antiviral response. B2 has been found to repress the host's antiviral response to allow the virus to successfully replicate.

== Associated diseases ==
Since nodamura virus infects insects, fish, and mammals, there are different diseases caused in different species. In wax moth larvae and honey bees, nodamura virus has been found to cause paralysis. Suckling mice and hamsters that have been inoculated with nodamura virus showed paralysis in their limbs, followed by death. In Aedes albopictus and Toxorhynchites amboinensis mosquitoes, nodamura virus induced a loss of balance and an inability to fly. This was then followed by paralysis and death.

== Tropism ==
Nodavirus has been found to successfully replicate in muscle cells and impair muscle fibrils causing paralysis.
