= BBV =

BBV may refer to:

== Science ==
- Black beetle virus
- Blood-borne virus

== Organisations ==
- Banco Bilbao Vizcaya, which merged into BBVA
- BBV Hagen, German basketball club
- Bill & Ben Video, production company
- Bolivian Stock Exchange (BBV)

== Other ==
- Karnai language, by ISO 639 code
- Nero-Mer Airport, by IATA code
