= Cross-species transmission =

Transmission of a pathogen between different species

Cross-species transmission (CST), also called interspecies transmission, host jump, or spillover, is the transmission of an infectious pathogen, such as a virus, between hosts belonging to different species. Once introduced into an individual of a new host species, the pathogen may cause disease for the new host and/or acquire the ability to infect other individuals of the same species, allowing it to spread through the new host population. The phenomenon is most commonly studied in virology, but cross-species transmission may also occur with bacterial pathogens or other types of microorganisms.

Steps involved in the transfer of pathogens to new hosts include contact between the pathogen and the host; the successful infection of an initial individual host, which may lead to amplification and an outbreak; and the adaptation of the pathogen, within either the original or new host, which may render it capable of spreading efficiently between individuals in populations of the new host. The concept is important in understanding and controlling emerging infectious diseases in humans, especially those caused by viruses. Most viral diseases of humans are zoonotic in origin, having been historically transmitted to human populations from various animal species; examples include SARS, Ebola, swine flu, rabies, and avian influenza.

The exact mechanisms which facilitate cross-species transmission vary by pathogen, and even for common diseases are often poorly understood. It is believed that viruses with high mutation rates are able to rapidly adapt to new hosts and thereby overcome host-specific immunological defenses, allowing their continued transmission. A host shifting event occurs when a strain that was previously zoonotic begins to circulate exclusively among the new host species.

Pathogen transfer is most likely to occur between species which are frequently in close contact with each other. It can also occur indirectly between species with less frequent contact if facilitated by an intermediary species; for example, a reservoir species may transfer the virus to a vector species, which in turn transfers the virus to humans.

The degree of phylogenetic relatedness between host species also influences the likelihood that a pathogen is transmitted between them, likely because of the similarity of the hosts' immunological defenses. E.g., most human zoonotic transmissions come from other species of mammals, being of same taxonomic class. That said, cross-species transmission has been observed from Whiteleg shrimp, another phylum altogether: Arthropoda vis-à-vis Chordata. (The pathogens of even more distantly related species, such as plant viruses, may not be capable of infecting humans at all.)

Other factors influencing transmission rates include but are not limited to geographic proximity and intraspecies behaviors. Due to climate change and habitat loss owing to land use expansion, the overall risk of viral spillover is predicted to significantly increase.

== Prevalence and control ==
Cross-species transmission is the most significant cause of disease emergence in humans and other species. Wildlife zoonotic diseases of microbial origin are also the most common group of human emerging diseases, and CST between wildlife and livestock has appreciable economic impacts in agriculture by reducing livestock productivity and imposing export restrictions. This makes CST of major concern for public health, agriculture, and wildlife management.

The authors of a study on the bubonic plague in Oran stress that the disease "is primarily a bacterial zoonosis affecting rodents. It is caused by Yersinia pestis and is transmitted from animal to animal by fleas. Humans usually become infected through the bite of an infected rodent flea." The sanitary control measure instituted by the public health authority was chemical in nature: "Intra- and peridomestic spraying with permethrin was conducted. Deltamethrin was dusted on the tracks and around the burrows of rodents located in a radius of 10 km around the dwelling of the patients. Uncontrolled killing of rats was prohibited."

A large proportion of viral pathogens that have emerged recently in humans are considered to have originated from various animal species. This is shown by several recent epidemics such as, avian flu, Ebola, monkeypox, and Hanta viruses. There is evidence to suggest that some diseases can potentially be re-introduced to human populations through animal hosts after they have been eradicated in humans. There is a risk of this phenomenon occurring with morbilliviruses as they can readily cross species barriers. CST can also have a significant effect on produce industries. Genotype VI-Avian paramyxovirus serotype 1 (GVI-PMV1) is a virus that arose through cross-species transmission events from Galliformes (i.e. chicken) to Columbiformes, and has become prevalent in the poultry industry.

CST of rabies virus variants between many different species populations is a major concern of wildlife management. Introduction of these variants into non-reservoir animals increases the risk of human exposures and threatens current advances toward rabies control.

Many pathogens are thought to have host specialization, which explains the maintenance of distinct strains in host species. Pathogens would have to overcome their host specificity to cross to a new host species. Some studies have argued that host specializations may be exaggerated, and pathogens are more likely to exhibit CST than previously thought. Original hosts usually have low death rates when infected with a pathogen, with fatality rates tending to be much higher in new hosts

=== Between non-human primates and humans ===
Due to the close relation of nonhuman primates (NHP) and humans, disease transmission between NHP and humans is relatively common and can become a major public health concern. Diseases such as HIV and human adenoviruses have been associated with NHP interactions.

In places where contact between humans and NHPs is frequent, precautions are often taken to prevent disease transmission. Simian foamy viruses (SFV) is an enzootic retrovirus that has high rates of cross-species transmission and has been known to affect humans bitten by infected NHPs. It has caused health concerns in places like Indonesia where visitors at monkey temples can contract SFV from temple macaques (Macaca fascicularis). TMAdV (titi monkey adenovirus) is a highly divergent, sharing <57% pairwise nucleotide identity with other adenoviruses, NHP virus that had a high fatality rate (83%) in monkeys and is capable of spreading through human hosts.

== Predicting and preventing transmission between species ==
Prediction and monitoring are important for the study of CSTs and their effects. However, factors that determine the origin and fate of cross-species transmission events remain unclear for the majority of human pathogens. This has resulted in the use of different statistical models for the analysis of CST. Some of these include risk-analysis models, single rate dated tip (SRDT) models, and phylogenetic diffusion models. The study of the genomes of pathogens involved in CST events is very useful in determining their origin and fate. This is because a pathogens genetic diversity and mutation rate are key factors in determining if it can transmit across multiple hosts. This makes it important for the genomes of transmission species to be partially or completely sequenced. A change in genomic structure could cause a pathogen that has a narrow host range to become capable of exploiting a wider host range. Genetic distance between different species, geographical range, and other interaction barriers will also influence cross-species transmission.

One approach to risk assessment analysis of CST is to develop risk-analysis models that break the ‘‘process’’ of disease transmission into parts. Processes and interactions that could lead to cross-species disease transmission are explicitly described as a hypothetical infection chain. Data from laboratory and field experiments are used to estimate the probability of each component, expected natural variation, and margins of error.

Different types of CST research would require different analysis pathways to meet their needs. A study on identification of viruses in bats that could spread to other mammals used the workflow: sequencing of genomic samples → “cleaning” of raw reads → elimination of host reads and eukaryotic contaminants → de novo assembly of the remaining reads → annotation of viral contigs → molecular detection of specific viruses → phylogenetic analysis → interpretation of data.

Detecting CST and estimating its rate based on prevalence data is challenging. Due to these difficulties, computational methods are used to analyse CST events and the pathogens associated with them. The explosive development of molecular techniques has opened new possibilities for using phylogenetic analysis of pathogen genetics to infer epidemiological parameters. This provides some insight into the origins of these events and how they could be addressed. Methods of CST prevention are currently using both biological and computational data. An example of this is using both cellular assays and phylogenetic comparisons to support a role for TRIM5α, the product of the TRIM5 gene, in suppressing interspecies transmission and emergence of retroviruses in nature.

== Analysis ==
=== Phylogeny ===
The comparison of genomic data is very important for the study of cross-species transmission. Phylogenetic analysis is used to compare genetic variation in both pathogens associated with CST and the host species that they infect. Taken together, it is possible to infer what allowed a pathogen to crossover to a new host (i.e. mutation in a pathogen, change in host susceptibility) and how this can be prevented in the future. If the mechanisms a pathogens uses to initially enter a new species are well characterized and understood a certain level of risk control and prevention can be obtained. In contact, a poor understanding of pathogens, and their associated diseases, makes it harder for preventive measures to be taken

Alternative hosts can also potentially have a critical role in the evolution and diffusion of a pathogen. When a pathogen crosses species it often acquires new characteristics that allow it to breach host barriers. Different pathogen variants can have very different effects on host species. Thus it can be beneficial to CST analysis to compare the same pathogens occurring in different host species. Phylogenetic analysis can be used to track a pathogens history through different species populations. Even if a pathogen is new and highly divergent, phylogenetic comparison can be very insightful. A useful strategy for investigating the history of epidemics caused by pathogen transmission combines molecular clock analysis, to estimate the timescale of the epidemic, and coalescent theory, to infer the demographic history of the pathogen. When constructing phylogenies, computer databases and tools are often used. Programs, such as BLAST, are used to annotate pathogen sequences, while databases like GenBank provide information about functions based on the pathogens genomic structure. Trees are constructed using computational methods such as MPR or Bayesian Inference, and models are created depending on the needs of the study. Single rate dated tip (SRDT) models, for example, allows for estimates of timescale under a phylogenetic tree. Models for CST prediction will vary depending on what parameters need to be accounted for when constructing the model.

=== Most parsimonious reconstruction (MPR) ===
Parsimony is the principle in which one chooses the simplest scientific explanation that fits the evidence. In terms of building phylogenetic trees, the best hypothesis is the one that requires the fewest evolutionary changes. Using parsimony to reconstruct ancestral character states on a phylogenetic tree is a method for testing ecological and evolutionary hypotheses. This method can be used in CST studies to estimate the number of character changes that exist between pathogens in relation to their host. This makes MPR useful for tracking a CST pathogen to its origins. MPR can also be used to the compare traits of host species populations. Traits and behaviours within a population could make them more susceptible to CST. For example, species which migrate regionally are important for spreading viruses through population networks.

Despite the success of parsimony reconstructions, research suggests they are often sensitive and can sometimes be prone to bias in complex models. This can cause problems for CST models that have to consider many variables. Alternatives methods, such as maximum likelihood, have been developed as an alternative to parsimony reconstruction.

=== Using genetic markers ===
Two methods of measuring genetic variation, variable number tandem repeats (VNTRs) and single nucleotide polymorphisms (SNPs), have been very beneficial to the study of bacterial transmission. VNTRs, due to the low cost and high mutation rates, make them particularly useful to detect genetic differences in recent outbreaks, and while SNPs have a lower mutation rate per locus than VNTRs, they deliver more stable and reliable genetic relationships between isolates. Both methods are used to construct phylogenies for genetic analysis, however, SNPs are more suitable for studies on phylogenies contraction. However, it can be difficult for these methods to accurately simulate CSTs everts. Estimates of CST based on phylogenies made using the VNTR marker can be biased towards detecting CST events across a wide range of the parameters. SNPs tend to be less biased and variable in estimates of CST when estimations of CST rates are low and a low number of SNPs is used. In general, CST rate estimates using these methods are most reliable in systems with more mutations, more markers, and high genetic differences between introduced strains. CST is very complex and models need to account for a lot of parameters to accurately represent the phenomena. Models that oversimplify reality can result in biased data. Multiple parameters such as number of mutations accumulated since introduction, stochasticity, the genetic difference of strains introduced, and the sampling effort can make unbiased estimates of CST difficult even with whole-genome sequences, especially if sampling is limited, mutation rates are low, or if pathogens were recently introduced.

The process of using genetic markers to estimate CST rates should take into account several important factors to reduce bias. One is that the phylogenetic tree constructed in the analysis needs to capture the underlying epidemiological process generating the tree. The models need to account for how the genetic variability of a pathogen influences a disease in a species, not just general differences in genomic structure. Two, the strength of the analysis will depend on the amount of mutation accumulated since the pathogen was introduced in the system. This is due to many models using the number of mutations as an indicator of CST frequency. Therefore, efforts are focused on estimating either time since the introduction or the substitution rate of the marker (from laboratory experiments or genomic comparative analysis). This is important not only when using the MPR method but also for Likelihood approaches that require an estimation of the mutation rate. Three, CST will also affect disease prevalence in the potential host, so combining both epidemiological time series data with genetic data may be an excellent approach to CST study

=== Bayesian analysis ===
Bayesian frameworks are a form of maximum likelihood-based analyses and can be very effective in cross-species transmission studies. Bayesian inference of character evolution methods can account for phylogenetic tree uncertainty and more complex scenarios, with models such as the character diffusion model currently being developed for the study of CST in RNA viruses. A Bayesian statistical approach presents advantages over other analyses for tracking CST origins. Computational techniques allow integration over an unknown phylogeny, which cannot be directly observed, and unknown migration process, which is usually poorly understood.

The Bayesian frameworks are also well suited to bring together different kinds of information. The BEAST software, which has a strong focus on calibrated phylogenies and genealogies, illustrates this by offering a large number of complementary evolutionary models including substitution models, demographic and relaxed clock models that can be combined into a full probabilistic model. By adding spatial reconstruction, these models create the probability of biogeographical history reconstruction from genetic data. This could be useful for determining the origins of cross-species transmissions. The high effectiveness of Bayesian statistical methods has made them instrumental in evolutionary studies. Bayesian ancestral host reconstruction under discrete diffusion models can be used to infer the origin and effects of pathogens associated with CST. One study on Human adenoviruses using Bayesian supported a gorilla and chimpanzee origin for the viral species, aiding prevention efforts. Despite presumably rare direct contact between sympatric populations of the two species, CST events can occur between them. The study also determined that two independent HAdV-B transmission events to humans occurred and that the HAdV-Bs circulating in humans are of zoonotic origin and have probably affected global health for most of our species lifetime.

Phylogenetic diffusion models are frequently used for phylogeographic analyses, with the inference of host jumping becoming of increasing interest. The Bayesian inference approach enables model averaging over several potential diffusion predictors and estimates the support and contribution of each predictor while marginalizing over phylogenetic history. For studying viral CST, the flexibility of the Bayesian statistical framework allows for the reconstruction of virus transmission between different host species while simultaneously testing and quantifying the contribution of multiple ecological and evolutionary influences of both CST spillover and host shifting. One study on rabies in bats showed geographical range overlap is a modest predictor for CST, but not for host shifts. This highlights how Bayesian inferences in models can be used for CST analysis.

== See also ==
- Mathematical modelling of infectious disease
- Reverse zoonosis
- Spillover infection
- Vector
- Zoonosis
- Feline zoonosis
