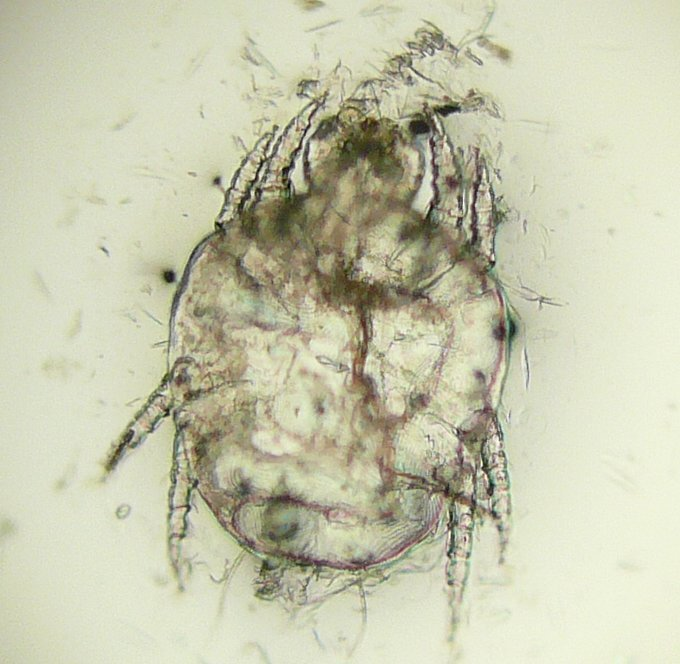
- Cheyletiella yasguri

Scientific classification
- Kingdom: Animalia
- Phylum: Arthropoda
- Subphylum: Chelicerata
- Class: Arachnida
- Order: Trombidiformes
- Family: Cheyletidae
- Genus: Cheyletiella
- Species: C. yasguri

Binomial name
- Cheyletiella yasguri Smiley, 1965

= Cheyletiella yasguri =

Species of mite

Cheyletiella yasguri is a species of mites from the genus Cheyletiella popularly known as "walking dandruff" and one of the many ectoparasites that targets domestic dogs.

Characterized as the “bite and run” parasite, the first reported case of Cheyletiella Yasguri was in Italy in the year of 1965. It is named after Dr. Isidor Yasgur, a vet from Mamaroneck, New York, who collected some of these parasites and sent them to the Cornell University. It has been found throughout the world with reported cases in the Italy, Germany, The Netherlands, the U.S. etc. A distinguishable characteristic that sets species C. yasguri apart from the others is the morphology of the sensory organ in the legs. The mite contains two lobes compared to the species C. parasitivorax which only contains one. Cheyletiella Yasguri causes irritation and inflammation of the skin (Dermatitis) usually as a result of allergic reaction. Young pups are most vulnerable and conditions can be mild to very severe. This mite resides in the outer layer of the skin (keratin) and does most of its feeding on the liquid substance of tissue. They do not dig into the skin and do not replicate.

== Diagnosis ==
In order to diagnose the condition, samples of the skin or fur must be further examined under a microscope. Other techniques used to diagnose the condition include deep scraping of the skin and removal of samples with the use of tape. Because symptoms are often similar those of Scabies, an accurate diagnosis would be under a microscope.

== Transmission ==
It is highly transmittable especially through physical contact. Humans are also prone to becoming infested with mites. If contact with pet is cut off completely symptoms will disappear after a short amount of time because the parasites do not replicate on humans. Common infested areas in humans vary from the chest, abdomen, arms, and buttocks. Common infestation areas in dogs include the neck, back, and tail. Results can be anything from lesions of the skin, severe itching, and sometimes the condition will go unnoticed in dogs.

== Treatments ==
In animals treatments range a wide variety of antibiotic therapy, antiparasitic therapy, topical steroids, Gamma benzene hexachloride, and insecticides. Less than one percent Gamma benzene hexachloride has proven to be very effective if used as prescribed by a veterinarian.
