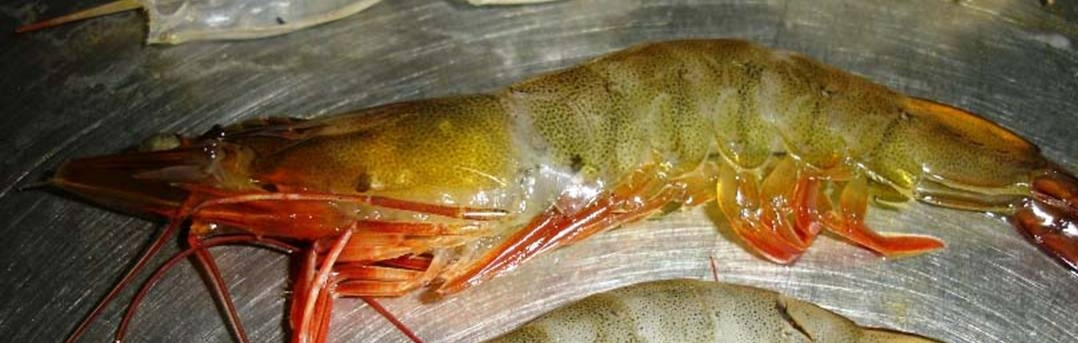
- Litopenaeus vannamei (whiteleg shrimp)

Virus classification
- (unranked): Virus
- Realm: Riboviria
- Kingdom: Orthornavirae
- Phylum: Kitrinoviricota
- Class: Magsaviricetes
- Order: Nodamuvirales
- Family: Nodaviridae
- Virus: Covert mortality nodavirus

= Covert mortality nodavirus =

Species of virus

Covert mortality nodavirus (CMNV) is a nodavirus infecting whiteleg shrimp which has been a major threat to the monoculture shrimp industry of long standing. In a novel example of zoonosis, it has become the cause of an emerging eye disease: persistent ocular hypertensive viral anterior uveitis (POH-VAU), a new type of uveitis. It has become an emerging public health concern.

CMNV was first discovered in 2014, providing an explanation to the covert mortality problem that has caused serious losses to China's shrimp industry since 2009. The association between CMNV and human POH-VAU was discovered in 2026. POH-VAU has been a problem in humans since 2019.

CMNV affects crustaceans, fish, and sea cucumber. A more up-to-date count finds that it naturally affects 6 phyla of animals: the Rotifera, Annelida, Mollusca, Echinodermata, Arthropoda, Chordata.

== Genome ==
The genome of CMNV is separated into two positive-sense RNA segments like most described nodaviruses: RNA1 carries the RNA methylase-replicase and B2 protein, RNA2 carries the capsid protein. CMNV does not technically fall into either Alphanodavirus or Betanodavirus, but it is closer to the former.

== In mammals ==
CMNV causes POH-VAU in humans and mice. The disease is characterized by recurring episodes of anterior uveitis presenting with extreme ocular hypertension, precipitates and aqueous cells. Repeated episodes lead to persistent intraocular pressure elevation that does not respond to medical intervention, "irreversible optic nerve damage, corneal endothelium loss, iris atrophy and severe vision impairment.

Most patients are home-based aquatic animal handlers, consumers with aquatic products, or people who come into contact with raw or live aquatic animals without eye protection in other ways. The remaining cases are close contacts of high-risk groups or those living near aquaculture environments. Infection can happen in mice by injection and by sharing water bottles with an infected mouse. It is possible that contacts of high-risk groups acquired this virus through a similar mechanism (e.g. shared utensils).

Current (2026) treatment consists of ganciclovir applied to the eye, steroids applied to the eye, and IOP-lowering medications. This combination is effective in 70% of patients, though half of them required long-term medication. The remaining 30% eventually require antiglaucoma surgery. If IOP elevation is persistent, trabeculectomy may be done.

== In crustaceans ==
CMNV infects many crustaceans, including but not limited to:

- Penaeus chinensis
- Penaeus japonicus
- Penaeus monodon
- Macrobrachium rosenbergii
- Palaemon carinicauda
- Penaeus vannamei
- Sinocorophium sinense
- Diogenes edwardsii
- Ocypode cordimanus
- Parathemisto gaudichaudii
- Tubuca arcuate
- Artemia
- Antarctic krill

All life stages are affected. The infection can be hard to spot because dying shrimp sink to deeper water. Mortality is "running" (gradual but uninterrupted) and is more common when water temperature exceeds 28 °C (82 °F) or during fluctuations of environmental condition.

CMNV can be transmitted through contaminated food and cannibalism. It is also transmitted via effluent water and co-habitation. It is likely transmitted vertically.

Genetic analysis suggests that the antarctic krill lineage may be the most ancient.

== In fish ==
Known to affect Paralichthys olivaceus, Larimichthys crocea, Danio rerio, Mugilogobius abei.

Causes anorexia and abnormal swimming behaviors (spiralling). Visual examination is normal, except in zebrafish where there is exopthalmus and red-brown discoloration of the tail.

== Epidemiology ==
CMNV was first identified in China in 2014 after investigations of losses in shrimp aquaculture since 2009. Earlier aquaculture disease research described CMNV as having no known zoonotic importance. A 2026 hospital-based case-control study in China then examined the association of CMNV with persistent ocular hypertensive viral anterior uveitis (POH-VAU), an emerging human eye disease. This study increased interest in CMNV as an emerging zoonotic pathogen linked to occupational and food-related aquatic exposures.

The study included 70 patients with POH-VAU, 34 hospital controls, and 27 healthy controls. After adjustment for age and sex, increased exposure frequency to aquatic animals (OR 1.15, 95% CI 1.08-1.23), number of severe exposures (OR 6.14, 95% CI 2.73-13.83), and exposure severity (10.91, 95% CI 3.61-32.96) were associated with increased odds of disease.

Among patients with a known exposure event, the median estimated interval between suspected exposure and disease onset was 6 months, with most cases occurring within 12 months.

Frequently reported exposures include unprotected handling of aquatic animals and repeated consumption of raw aquatic products. Because CMNV has been detected in numerous crustaceans, fish, mollusks, echinoderms, and other aquatic species, they may function as reservoirs or vectors for continued transmission. The virus has also been discussed as a One Health concern, since it links animal, environmental, and human health systems.

== Geographic spread over time ==
CMNV was first identified in China and then later reported in Thailand as well. Subsequent surveillance studies detected the virus in samples from Asia, Africa, the Americas, Europe, and Antarctica, suggesting broad distribution around the world.

== Prevention ==
Recommended control measures in the aquaculture industry include the use of CMNV-free broodstock and post-larvae, ensuring that feeds do not risk exposure, exclusion of reservoir species from ponds, and surveillance before movement of animals between facilities.

For human exposure reduction, individuals should use protective measures such as gloves during handling and processing of aquatic animals.
