= Cheyletiella blakei =

Scientific classification
- Kingdom: Animalia
- Phylum: Arthropoda
- Subphylum: Chelicerata
- Class: Arachnida
- Order: Trombidiformes
- Family: Cheyletidae
- Genus: Cheyletiella
- Species: C. blakei

Binomial name
- Cheyletiella blakei Smiley, 1970

Species of mite

Cheyletiella blakei is a small mite and ectoparasitic of domestic cats. It is a zoonosis that can be transmitted from the cat to humans. Its symptoms in human can include dermatosis, extreme 'itchiness'. Those who are most susceptible are people who have close contact with cats. Occurrences of the infection are low but it may be an emerging pathogen in California. The treatment and prevention of infection with C. blakei is to treat the cat with pesticide. The symptoms in the person then subside
