= Lanceacheyla =

Lanceacheyla whartoni

Scientific classification
- Kingdom: Animalia
- Phylum: Arthropoda
- Subphylum: Chelicerata
- Class: Arachnida
- Order: Trombidiformes
- Family: Cheyletidae
- Genus: Lanceacheyla; Xia, Klompen & Childers, 2011
- Species: L. whartoni

Binomial name
- Lanceacheyla whartoni Xia, Klompen & Childers, 2011

Genus of mites

Lanceacheyla whartoni is a species of mite in a monotypic genus in the family Cheyletidae.
