= Staphylococcus intermedius =

Scientific classification
- Domain: Bacteria
- Kingdom: Bacillati
- Phylum: Bacillota
- Class: Bacilli
- Order: Bacillales
- Family: Staphylococcaceae
- Genus: Staphylococcus
- Species: S. intermedius

Binomial name
- Staphylococcus intermedius Hájek 1976

Synonyms
- Staphylococcus aureus var. canis Meyer 1966; Staphylococcus aureus biovar E Hájek and Marsálek 1971

Species of bacterium

Staphylococcus intermedius is a Gram-positive, catalase positive member of the bacterial genus Staphylococcus consisting of clustered cocci. Strains of this species were originally isolated from the anterior nares of pigeons, dogs, cats, mink, and horses. Many of the isolated strains show coagulase activity. Clinical tests for detection of methicillin-resistant S. aureus may produce false positives by detecting S. intermedius, as this species shares some phenotypic traits with methicillin-resistant S. aureus strains. It has been theorized that S. intermedius has previously been misidentified as S. aureus in human dog bite wound infections, which is why molecular technologies such as MALDI-TOF and PCR are preferred in modern veterinary clinical microbiology laboratories for their more accurate identifications over biochemical tests. S. intermedius is largely phenotypically indiscriminate from Staphylococcus pseudintermedius and Staphylococcus delphini, and therefore the three organisms are considered to be included in the more general 'Staphylococcus intermedius group'.
