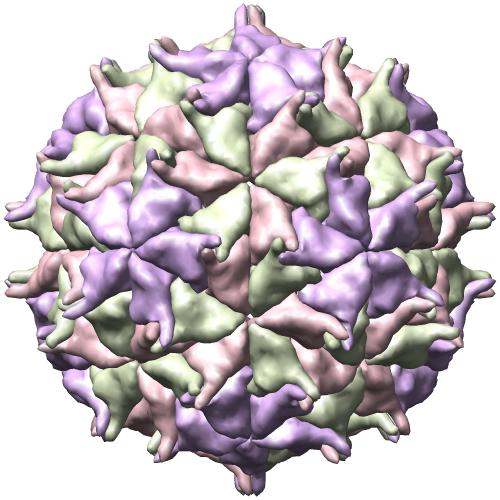
- Structure of Nodamura virus

Virus classification
- (unranked): Virus
- Realm: Riboviria
- Kingdom: Orthornavirae
- Phylum: Kitrinoviricota
- Class: Magsaviricetes
- Order: Nodamuvirales
- Family: Nodaviridae
- Genus: Alphanodavirus

= Alphanodavirus =

Genus of viruses

Alphanodavirus is a genus of non-enveloped positive-strand RNA viruses in the family Nodaviridae. Insects, mammals, and fishes serve as natural hosts. Diseases associated with this genus include: Nodamura virus paralysis in infected wax moth larvae. Member viruses can also provoke paralysis and death to suckling mice and suckling hamsters. There are five species in this genus.

== Structure ==
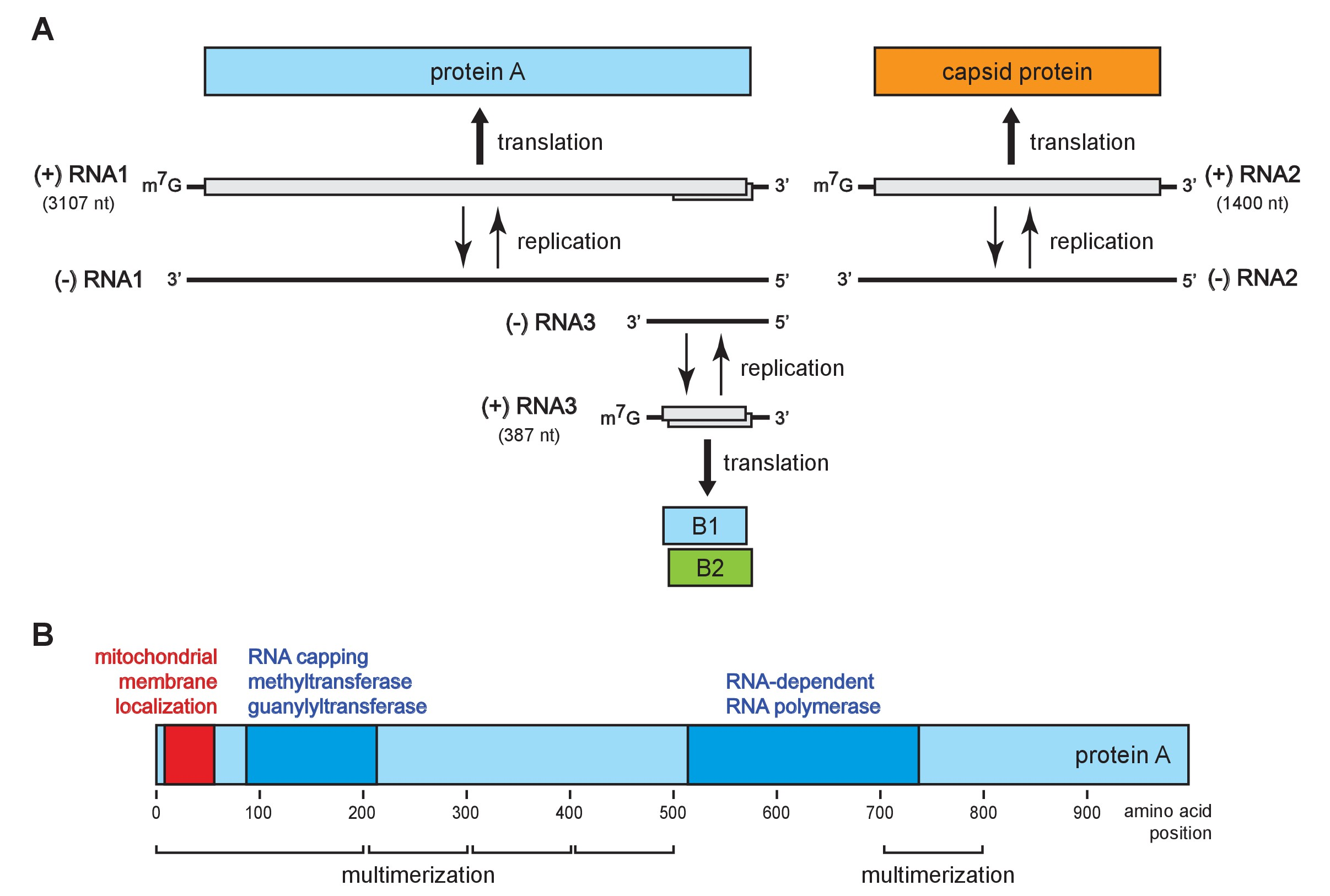
Flock House virus genome and functional map of replicase protein A.

Viruses in the genus Alphanodavirus are non-enveloped, with icosahedral geometries, and T=3 symmetry. The diameter is around 30 nm. Genomes are linear and segmented, bipartite, around 21.4kb in length.

== Life cycle ==
Viral replication is cytoplasmic. Entry into the host cell is achieved by penetration into the host cell. Replication follows the positive-strand RNA virus replication model. Positive-strand RNA virus transcription, using the internal initiation model of subgenomic RNA transcription is the method of transcription. Member viruses are released by lysis of the infected host cell. Insects, mammals, and fishes serve as the natural host.

== Taxonomy ==
The genus contains the following species, listed by scientific name and followed by their common names:

- Alphanodavirus boolarraense, Boolarra virus
- Alphanodavirus flockense, Flock House virus
- Alphanodavirus heteronychi, Black beetle virus
- Alphanodavirus nodamuraense, Nodamura virus
- Alphanodavirus pariacotoense, Pariacoto virus
