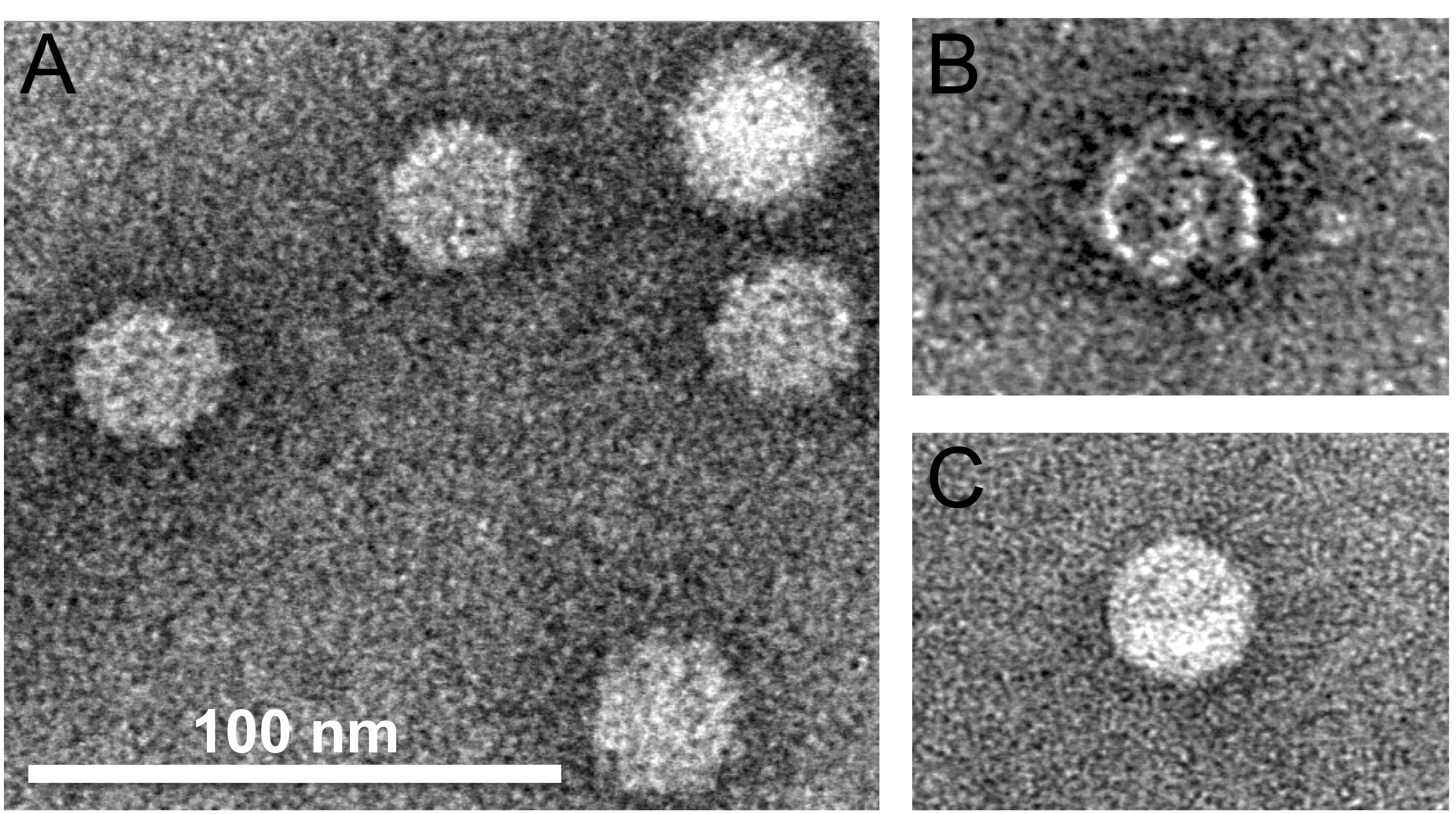
- Electron micrographs of grouper nervous necrosis virus particles

Virus classification
- (unranked): Virus
- Realm: Riboviria
- Kingdom: Orthornavirae
- Phylum: Kitrinoviricota
- Class: Magsaviricetes
- Order: Nodamuvirales
- Family: Nodaviridae
- Genus: Betanodavirus

= Betanodavirus =

Genus of viruses

Betanodavirus, or nervous necrosis virus (NNV), is a genus of nonenveloped positive-strand RNA viruses in the family Nodaviridae. Member viruses infect fish and cause viral nervous necrosis (VNN) and viral encephalopathy and retinopathy (VER). The genus contains four species.

== History ==
Betanodaviruses were first reported between 1989 and 1991. They were linked with high mortality rates in young fish and were initially described as a picornavirus-like virus. They were discovered around the same time in Australia, Norway, France and Japan. The oldest evidence related to the virus, however, dates back to 1984 in Queensland (Australia) where a disease outbreak with the clinical signs and histopathological lesions corresponding to NNV was reported.

== Virology ==
=== Structure ===
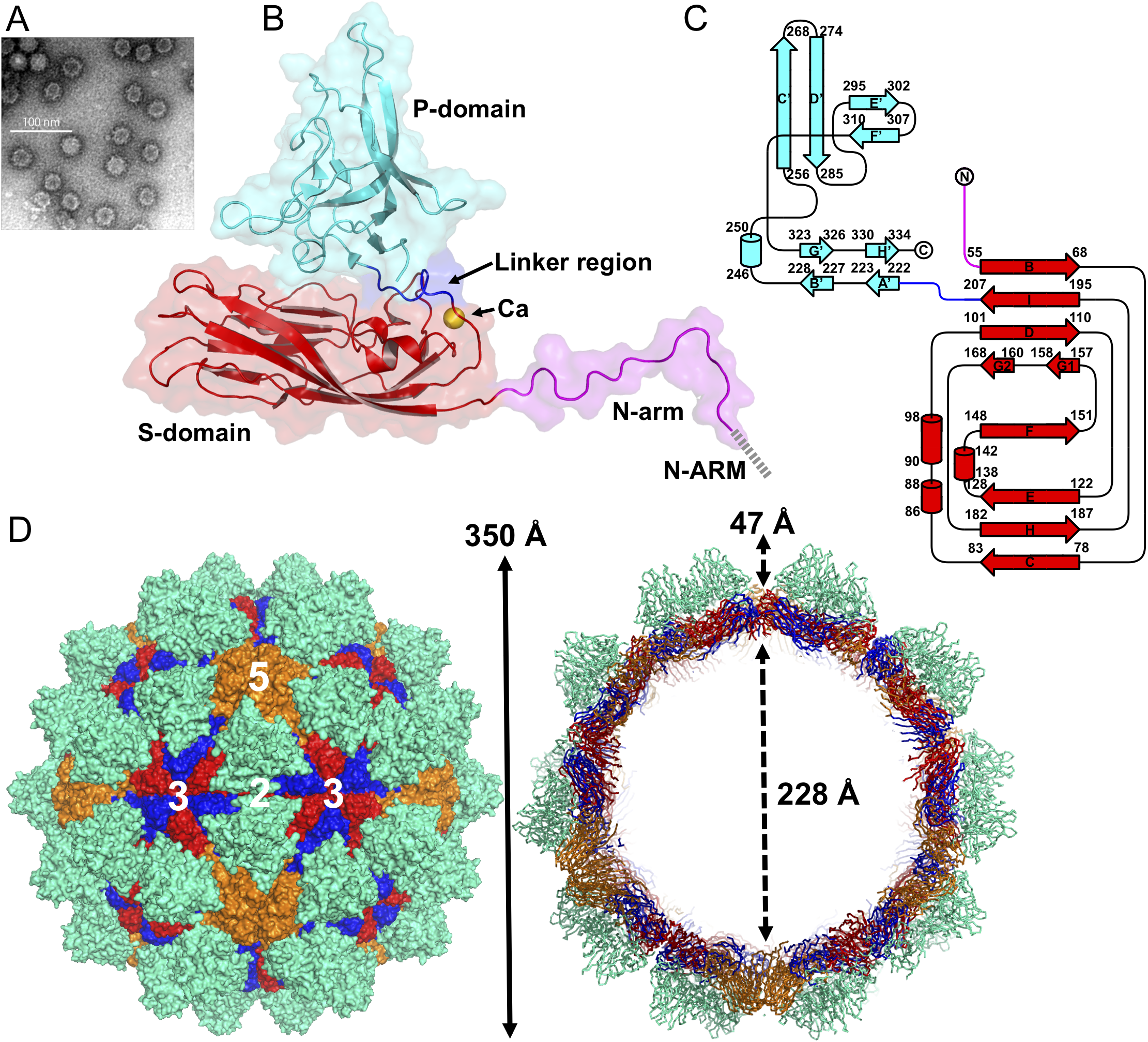
EM image and structure of grouper nervous necrosis virus (GNNV).

Viruses in the genus Betanodavirus are non-enveloped, with icosahedral geometries and T=3 symmetry. The diameter is around 37 nm. The virus-like particle contains 180 subunits of the capsid protein, and each capsid protein (CP) shows three major domains: (i) the N-terminal arm, an inter-subunit extension at the inner surface; (ii) the shell domain (S-domain), a jelly-roll structure; and (iii) the protrusion domain (P-domain) formed by three-fold trimeric protrusions.

=== Genomes ===
Genomes are linear, segmented, bipartite, and around 21.4kb in total length. The genome is split in two segments RNA1 and RNA2 that together encode three genes.

=== Life cycle ===
Viral replication is cytoplasmic. Entry into the host cell is achieved by penetration into the host cell. Replication follows the positive stranded RNA virus replication model. Positive stranded RNA virus transcription, using the internal initiation model of subgenomic RNA transcription is the method of transcription. Fish serve as the natural host. Transmission routes are passive diffusion and contact.

== Disease ==
Betanodaviruses affect teleost fish. A number of species are reported susceptible, more than 40 species, most of them marine. Transmission routes are passive diffusion and contact. The disease is more likely to occur in larvae or juveniles but it can also affect adults.

== Clinical signs and lesions ==
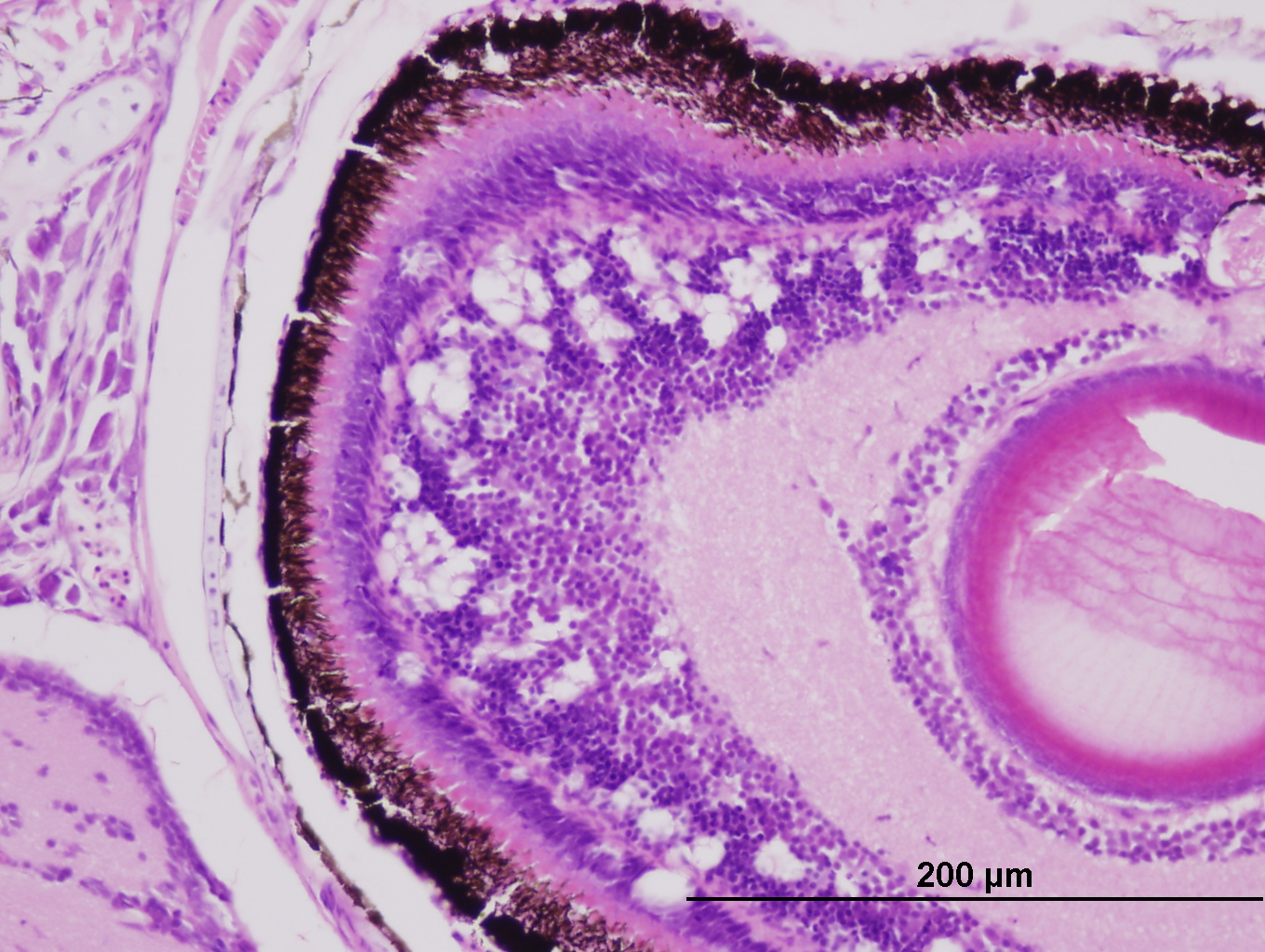
Vacuoles in retina of Australian bass larva infected with NNV

Viral nervous necrosis can have a clinical or sub-clinical presentation. Signs include: abnormal behaviour like lethargy, anorexia, spiral swimming; and change in pigmentation. Mortalities of affected populations can be of up to 100%. Microscopical lesions are mostly located in brain, retina and spinal cord where necrosis of the neurons and the presence of round empty spaces called vacoules are commonly associated with the disease.

== Evolution ==
The most recent common ancestor of the four extant genotypes has been dated to ~1300 CE. An early reassortment event appears to have occurred in the early 1980s in Southern Europe.

== Taxonomy ==
The genus contains the following species, listed by scientific name and followed by their common names:

- Betanodavirus epinepheli, Redspotted grouper nervous necrosis virus
- Betanodavirus pseudocarangis, Striped jack nervous necrosis virus
- Betanodavirus takifugui, Tiger puffer nervous necrosis virus
- Betanodavirus verasperi, Barfin flounder nervous necrosis virus
