= Nero-Mer Airport =

Airport in Ivory Coast

- IATA: BBV; ICAO: DIGN

Summary
- Airport type: Public
- Serves: Grand-Béréby
- Elevation AMSL: 20 ft / 6 m
- Coordinates: 4°38′36″N 6°55′26″W

Map

Runways
Direction	Length		Surface
Direction	ft	m	Surface
06/24	3,313	1,010	Unpaved
- Source: Google Maps

Nero-Mer Airport (IATA: BBV, ICAO: DIGN) is an airport serving Grand-Béréby, Côte d'Ivoire.

== See also ==
- Transport in Côte d'Ivoire
