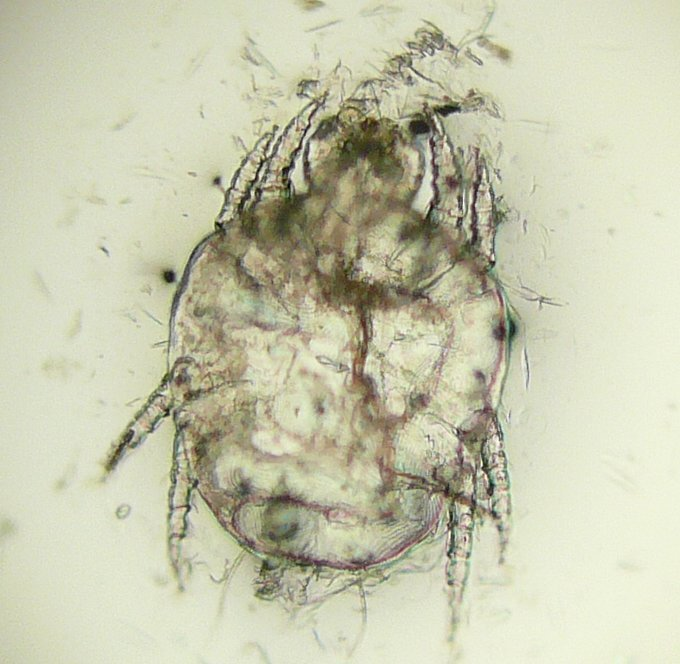
- Cheyletiella yasguri (?) from a dog

Scientific classification
- Kingdom: Animalia
- Phylum: Arthropoda
- Subphylum: Chelicerata
- Class: Arachnida
- Order: Trombidiformes
- Family: Cheyletidae
- Genus: Cheyletiella; G. Canestrini, 1886

Species
- Cheyletiella blakei Smiley, 1970; Cheyletiella curvidens Lawrence, 1948; Cheyletiella ochotonae Volgin, 1960; Cheyletiella parasitivorax (Mégnin, 1877); Cheyletiella romerolagi (Fain, 1972); Cheyletiella strandtmanni Smiley, 1970; Cheyletiella yasguri Smiley, 1965

Synonyms
- Ewingella; Bicheyletiella

= Cheyletiella =

Genus of mites

Cheyletiella is a genus of mites that live on the skin surface of dogs, cats, and rabbits.

The adult mites are about 0.385 millimeters long, have eight legs with combs instead of claws, and have palpi that end in prominent hooks. They do not burrow into the skin, but live in the keratin level. Their entire 21-day life cycle is on one host. They cannot survive off the host for more than 10 days.

== Cheyletiellosis ==
Cheyletiellosis (also known as Cheyletiella dermatitis)," is a mild dermatitis caused by mites of the genus Cheyletiella. It is also known as walking dandruff due to skin scales being carried by the mites.

Cheyletiellosis is seen more commonly in areas where fleas are less prevalent, because of the decreased use of flea products that are also efficacious for the treatment of this mite.

Cheyletiellosis is highly contagious. Transmission is by direct contact with an affected animal.

=== Presentation ===
Symptoms in animals vary from no signs to intense itching, scales on the skin, and hair loss. The lesions are usually on the back of the animal. Symptoms in humans include multiple red, itchy bumps on the arms, trunk, and buttocks. Because humans are not a host for the mite, the symptoms usually go away in about three weeks. Though the medical community does not consider a human mite infestation a legitimate diagnosis, it will treat the symptoms if necessary.

=== Diagnosis ===
Diagnosis is by finding the mites or eggs microscopically in a skin scraping, combing, or on acetate tape applied to the skin.

=== Treatment ===
The most common treatment in animals is weekly use of some form of topical pesticide appropriate for the affected animal, often an antiflea product. Fipronil works well, especially in cats. Cats can also be treated with a lime sulfur insecticide dip or a shampoo with non-pyrethrin insecticide for two weeks beyond the conclusion of symptoms.

In unresponsive cases, ivermectin is used. Selamectin is also recommended for treatment. None of these products are approved for treatment of cheyletiellosis. Other pets in the same household should also be treated, and the house or kennel must be treated with an environmental flea spray.

== Species ==
- Cheyletiella blakei Smiley, 1970 — infests cats (Felis catus), USA (Washington DC)
- Cheyletiella parasitivorax — infests rabbits (Oryctolagus cuniculus), France
- Cheyletiella romerolagi (Fain, 1972) — infests Romerolagus diazi, USA (New York)
- Cheyletiella strandtmanni Smiley, 1970 — infests hares (Lepus spp.), Taiwan
- Cheyletiella yasguri Smiley, 1965 — infests dogs

C. yasguri and C. blakei can transiently affect humans.

== See also ==
- List of mites associated with cutaneous reactions
- Mange
