= Flock House virus =

Virus classification
- (unranked): Virus
- Realm: Riboviria
- Kingdom: Orthornavirae
- Phylum: Kitrinoviricota
- Class: Magsaviricetes
- Order: Nodamuvirales
- Family: Nodaviridae
- Genus: Alphanodavirus
- Species: Alphanodavirus flockense

Species of virus

Flock House virus (FHV) is in the Alphanodavirus genus of the Nodaviridae family of viruses. Flock House virus was isolated from a grass grub (Costelytra zealandica) at the Flock House research station in Bulls, New Zealand. FHV is an extensively studied virus and is considered a model system for the study of other non-enveloped RNA viruses owing to its small size and genetic tractability, particularly to study the role of the transiently exposed hydrophobic gamma peptide and the metastability of the viral capsid. FHV can be engineered in insect cell culture allowing for the tailored production of native or mutant authentic virions or virus-like-particles. FHV is a platform for nanotechnology and nanomedicine, for example, for epitope display and vaccine development. Viral entry into host cells occurs via receptor-mediated endocytosis. Receptor binding initiates a sequence of events during which the virus exploits the host environment in order to deliver the viral cargo in to the host cytosol. Receptor binding prompts the meta-stability of the capsid–proteins, the coordinated rearrangements of which are crucial for subsequent steps in the infection pathway. In addition, the transient exposure of a covalently-independent hydrophobic γ-peptide is responsible for breaching cellular membranes and is thus essential for the viral entry of FHV into host cells.

== Genome ==
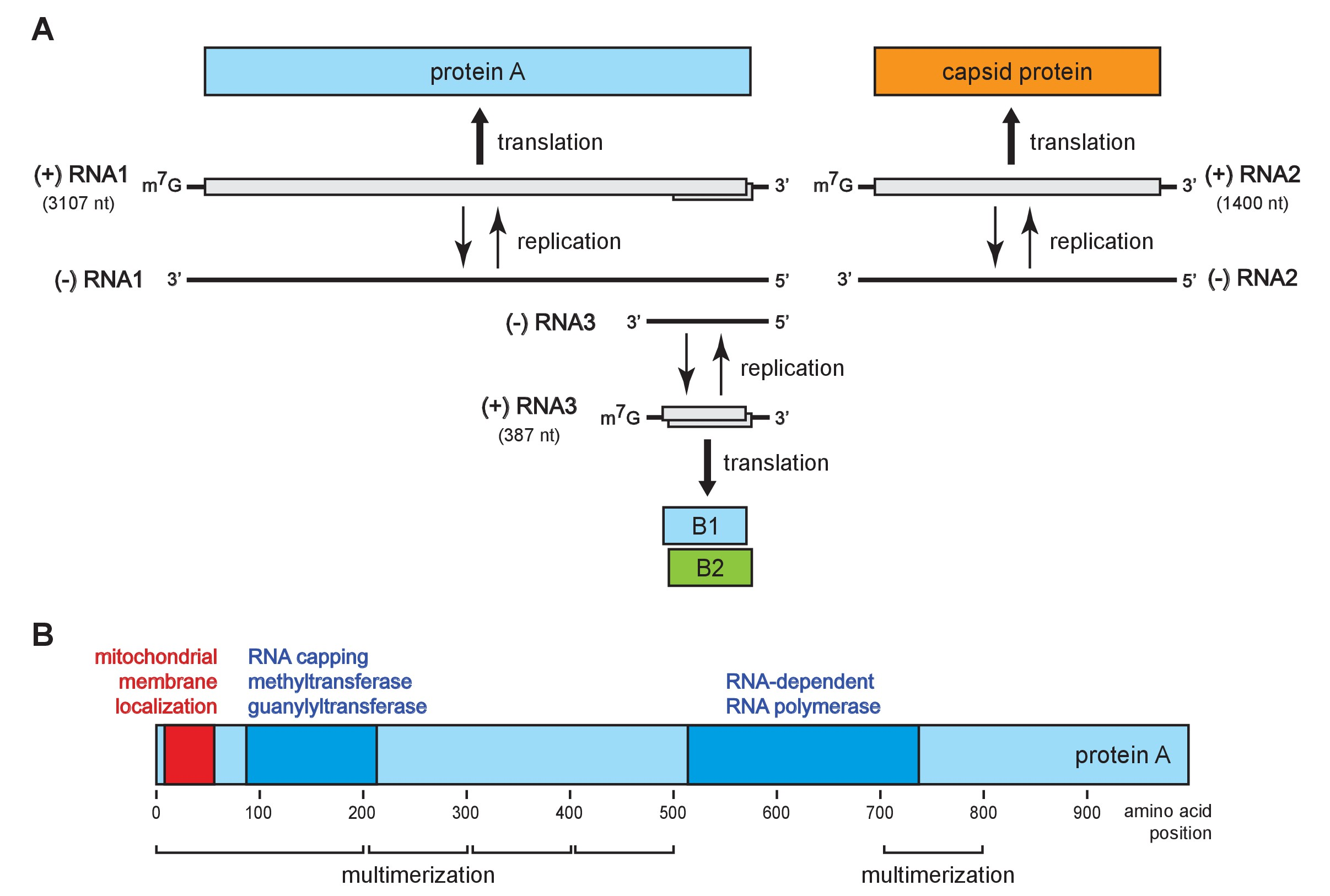
Flock house virus genome and functional map of replicase protein A.

Flock House virus is a small, non-enveloped, icosahedral T=3 insect virus containing a bipartite positive sense ssRNA genome comprising two genes: RNA1 (3.1kb) an RNA2 (1.4kb). RNA1 encodes the RNA-dependent RNA polymerase and also contains a frame-shifted subgenomic RNA 3 (369 nts) that encodes protein B2, responsible for inhibition of RNAi pathways. RNA2 encodes the capsid precursor, alpha, of which 180 copies form the viral capsid of FHV. Upon maturation, alpha undergoes an autocatalytic cleavage in its C-terminus to form beta, forming the main structural capsid component, and gamma, a short hydrophobic peptide required for endosome penetration that remains associated with the viral capsid. Virus-Like-Particles (VLPs) of FHV spontaneously form in S. frugiperda cell lines (e.g. Sf21) when RNA2 is expressed from a baculovirus vector and package cellular RNAs.

== Range ==
FHV was originally isolated from New Zealand grass grubs (Costelytra zealandica) in the former Flock House agricultural facility in Bulls, Ragnitikei, New Zealand. Isolates were passaged in Drosophila cells in culture, which were subsequently shown to exhibit cell-death (cytopathic effect). FHV can also infect live flies. FHV has been shown to infect medically important genera of insects: mosquitos, e.g. Anopheles gambiae; the tsetse fly; and the Chagas vector, Rhodnius prolixus Stal. Infection of these organisms by FHV has been demonstrated to have similar characteristics in terms of viral titre, virus dissemination and mortality as has been shown for fruit fly infections.
