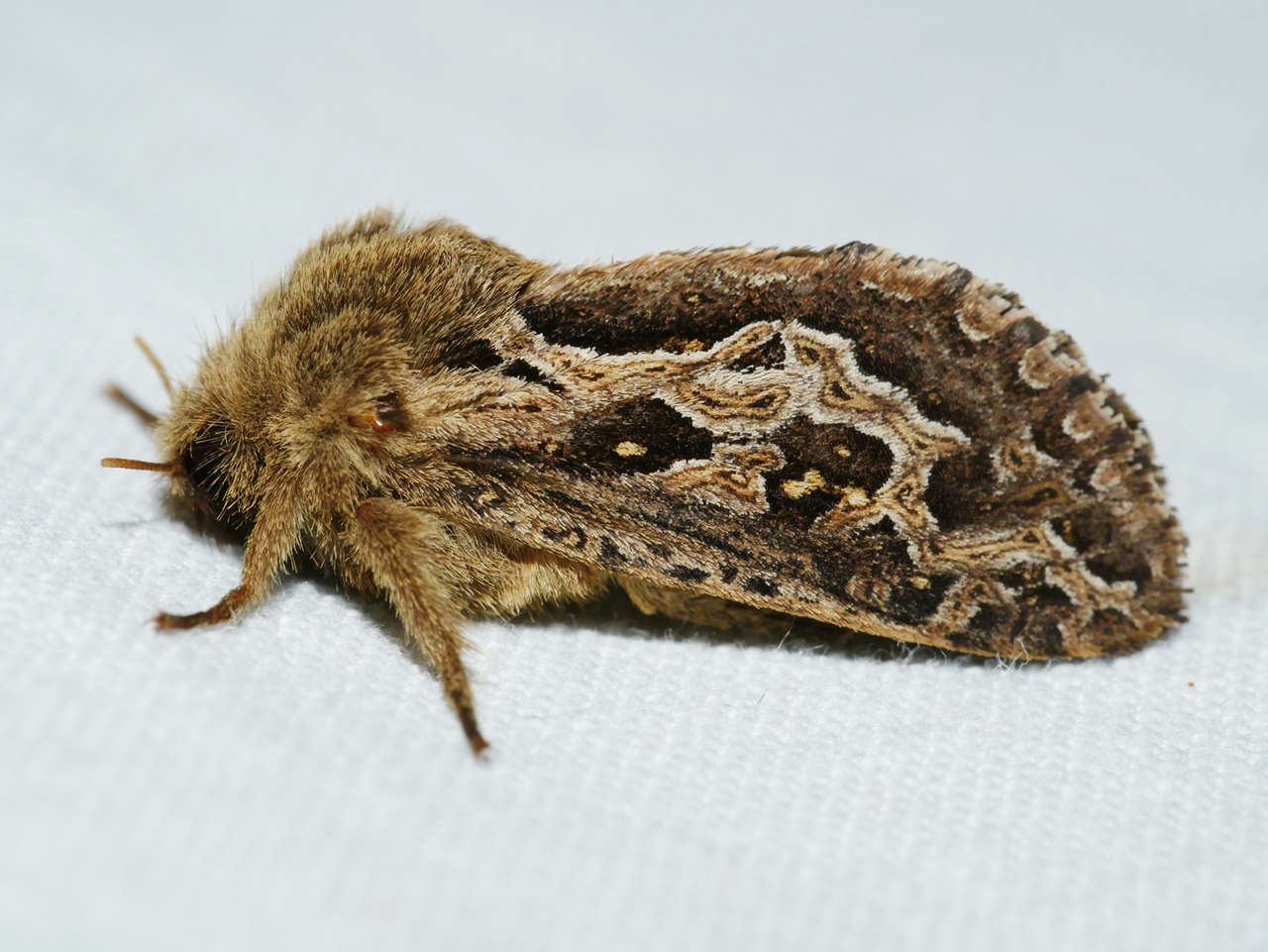

Scientific classification
- Domain: Eukaryota
- Kingdom: Animalia
- Phylum: Arthropoda
- Class: Insecta
- Order: Lepidoptera
- Family: Hepialidae
- Genus: Oncopera
- Species: O. intricoides

Binomial name
- Oncopera intricoides Tindale, 1933

= Oncopera intricoides =

Species of moth

Oncopera intricoides is a moth of the family Hepialidae. It is endemic to Victoria.
