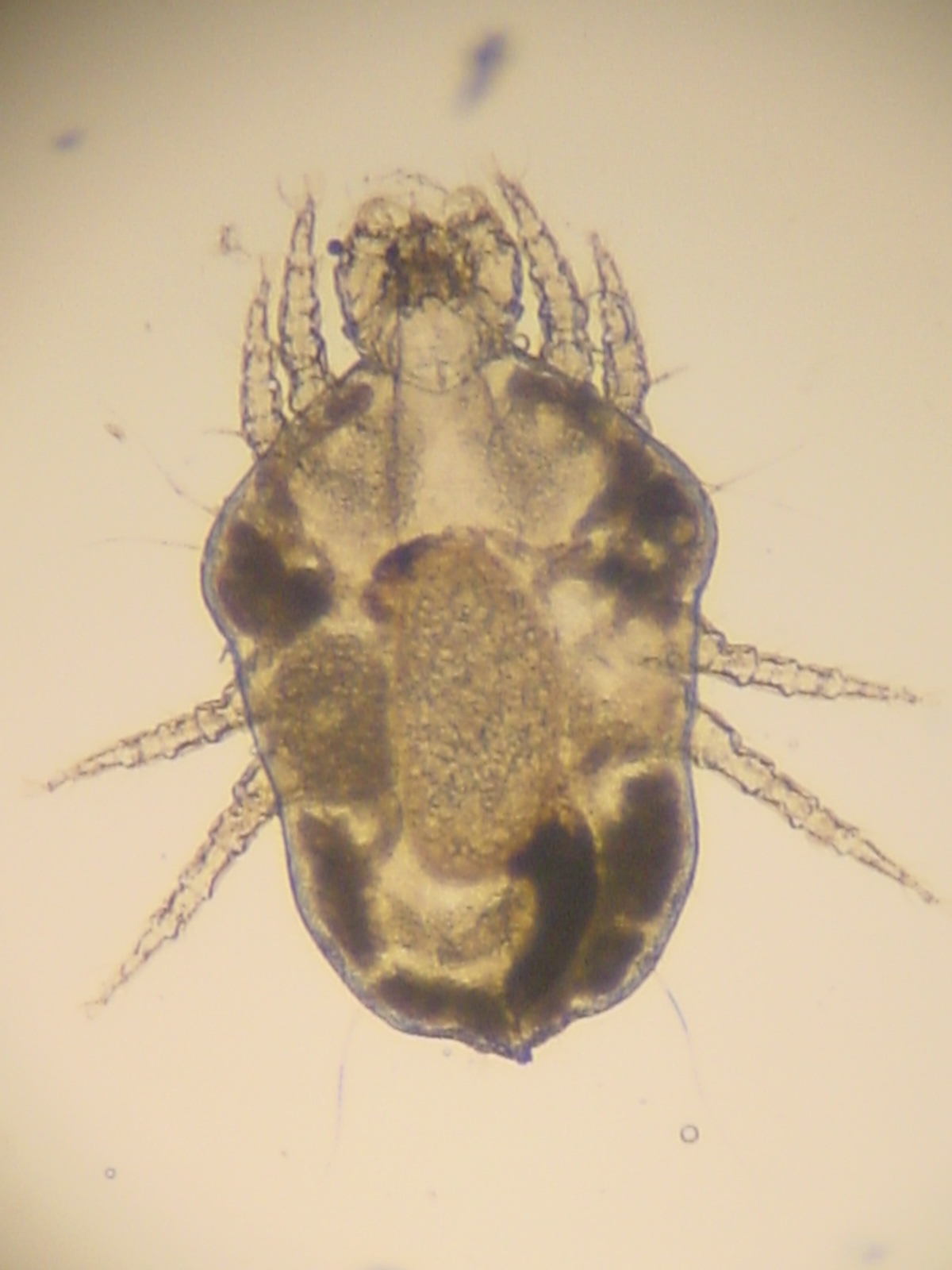
- Cheyletiella sp.

Scientific classification
- Kingdom: Animalia
- Phylum: Arthropoda
- Subphylum: Chelicerata
- Class: Arachnida
- Order: Trombidiformes
- Superfamily: Cheyletoidea
- Family: Cheyletidae; Leach, 1815

Genera
- Cheyletiella; Cheyletus; Cheletophyes; Eucheyletia; Hypopicheyla; Lanceacheyla; Nodele; Paracheyletia

Diversity
- c. 80 genera, > 500 species

= Cheyletidae =

Cheyletidae Temporal range: Cretaceous–present

Family of mites

Cheyletidae is a family of mites in the order Trombidiformes. Some Cheyletiella spp. are parasites of mammals, causing cheyletiellosis or "walking dandruff". Others are free-ranging predators which can be found in soil, forest litter, animal nests, and house dust, under tree bark, and on foliage. Cheyletids may occur in corpses, where they feed on other mites and on nematodes.

== Description ==
Cheyletidae have short stylet-like chelicerae and large pincer-like palps. The palp tarsus is short and usually bears comb-like and sickle-like setae, and is located on the posterior part of the palp tibia. The palp tibia has a strong claw which extends beyond the palp tarsus. The body may have zero, one or multiple dorsal plates.

== Gallery ==
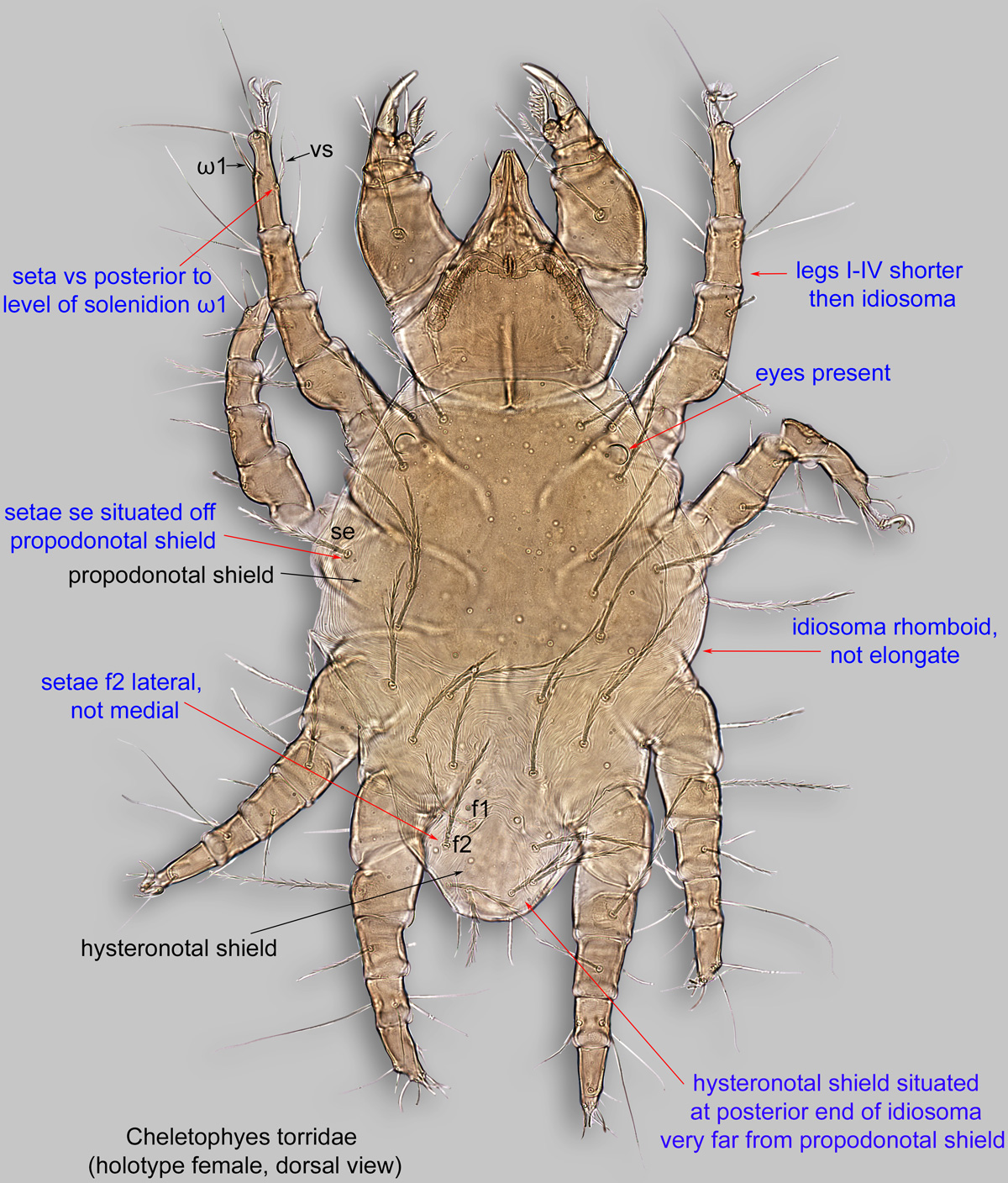
Cheletophyes torridae

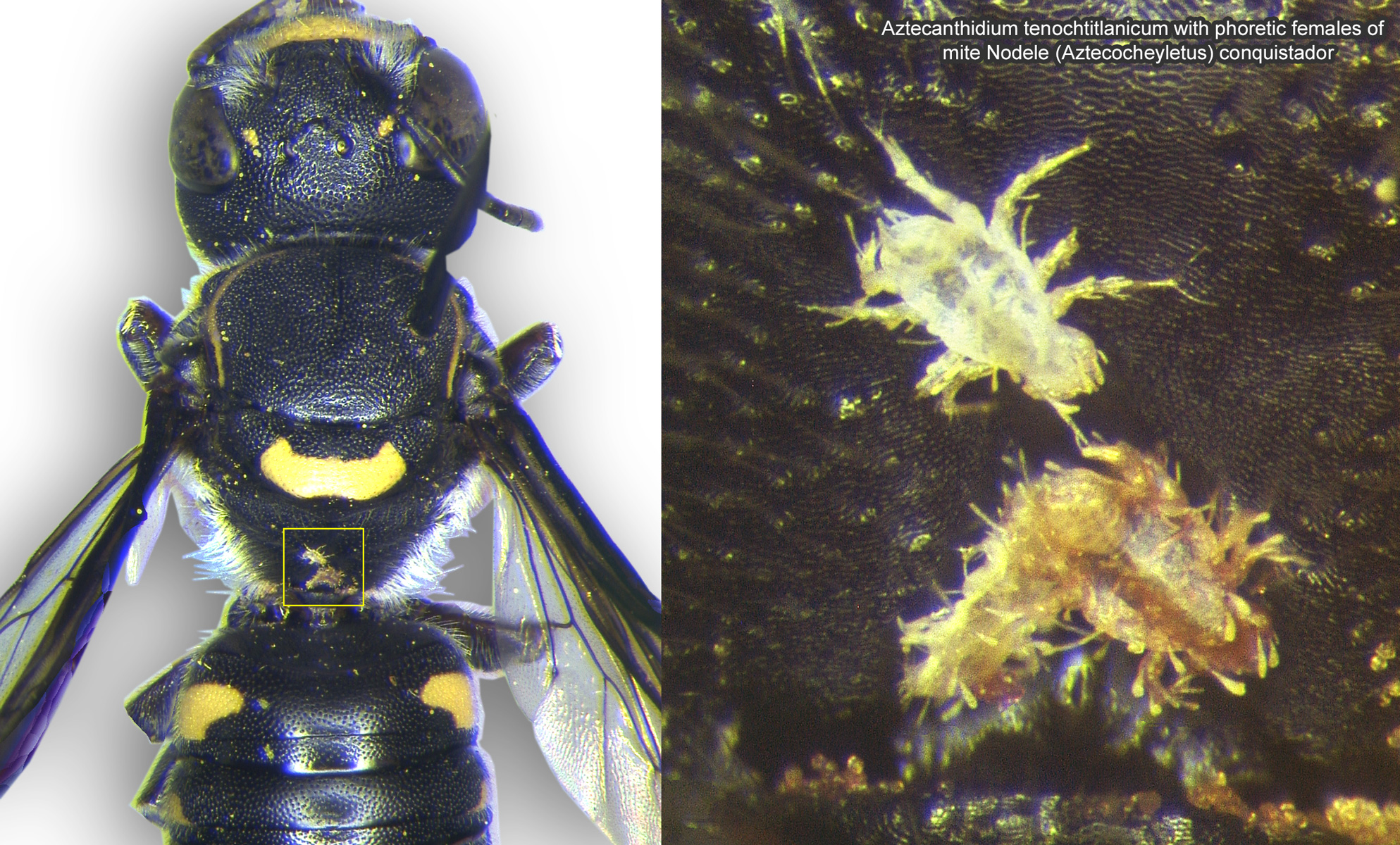
Nodele conquistador on bee Aztecanthidium tenochtitlanicum
