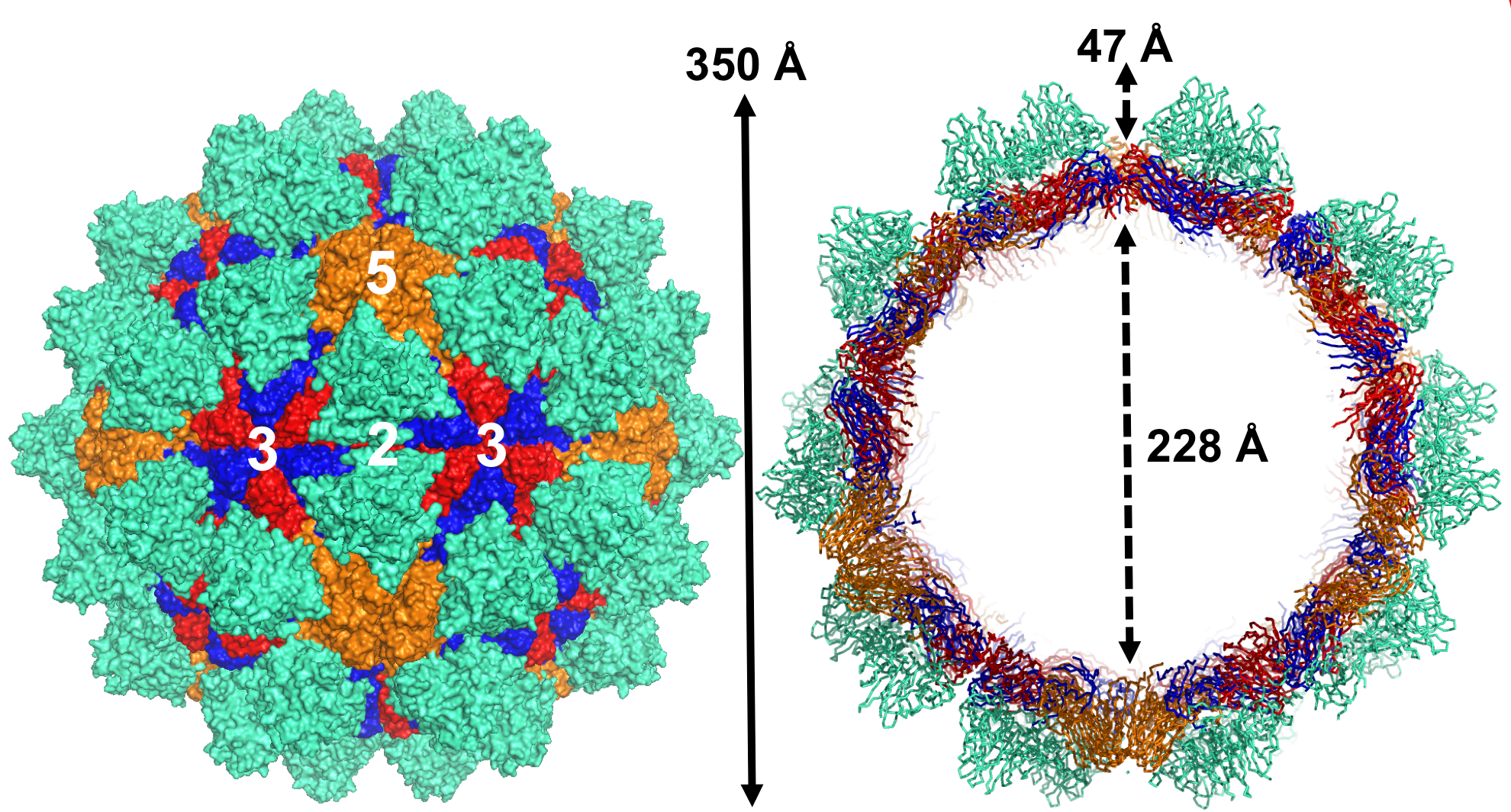
- Crystal structure of grouper nervous necrosis virus a piscine betanodavirus

Virus classification
- (unranked): Virus
- Realm: Riboviria
- Kingdom: Orthornavirae
- Phylum: Kitrinoviricota
- Class: Magsaviricetes
- Order: Nodamuvirales
- Family: Nodaviridae

= Nodaviridae =

Family of viruses

Nodaviridae is a family of nonenveloped positive-strand RNA viruses. Vertebrates and invertebrates serve as natural hosts. Diseases associated with this family include: viral encephalopathy and retinopathy in fish; covert mortality of shrimp; persistent ocular hypertensive viral anterior uveitis in humans. There are two genera in the family.

== History ==
The name of the family is derived from the Japanese village of Nodamura, Iwate Prefecture where Nodamura virus was first isolated from Culex tritaeniorhynchus mosquitoes.

== Virology ==
=== Structure ===
The virus is not enveloped and has an icosahedral capsid (triangulation number = 3) ranging from 29 to 35 nm in diameter. The capsid is constructed of 32 capsomers.

=== Genome ===
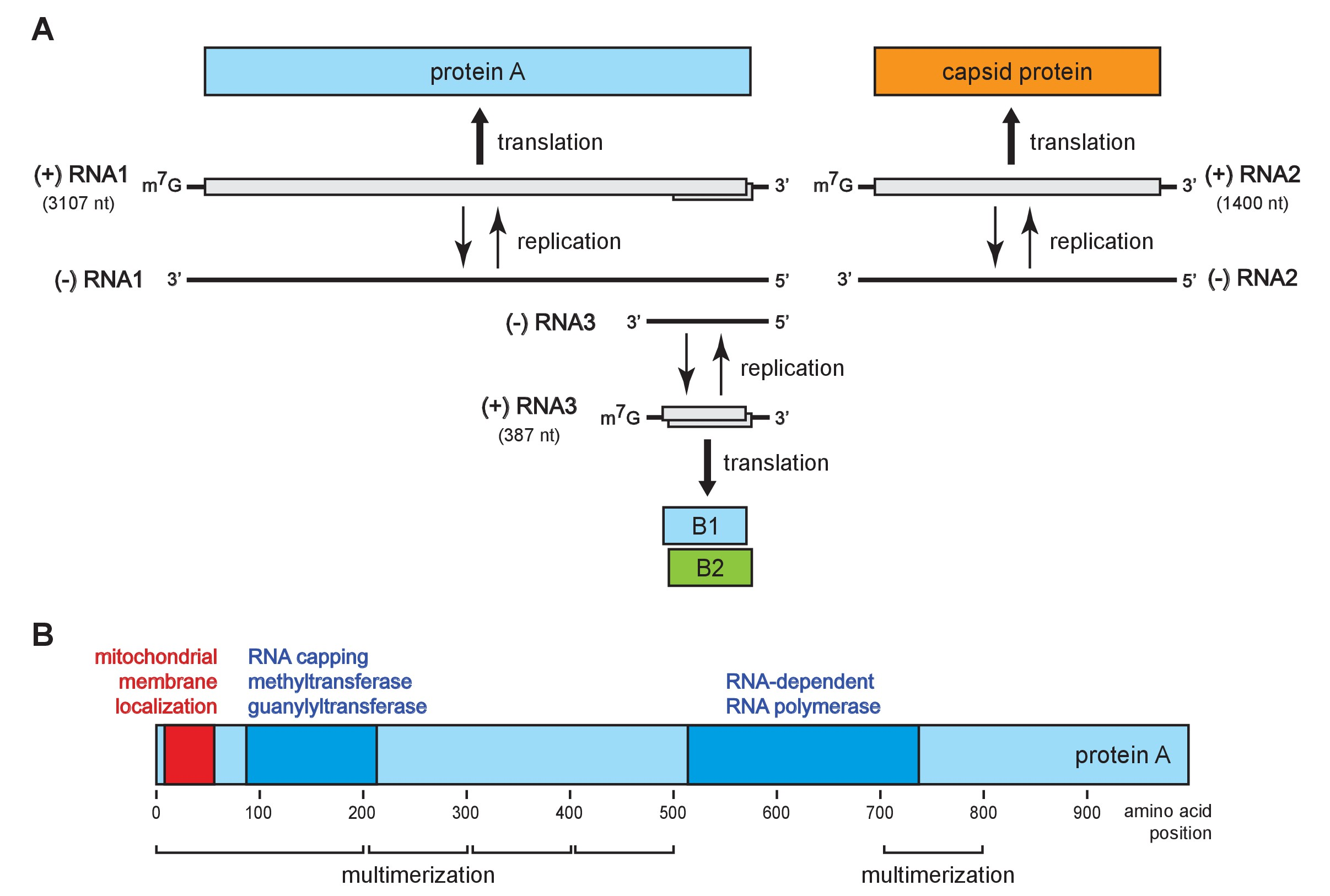
(A): Flock House virus genome; (B): functional map of replicase protein A.

The genome is linear, positive sense, bipartite (consisting of two segments, RNA1 and RNA2) single stranded RNA comprising 4500 nucleotides with a 5’ terminal methylated cap and a non-polyadenylated 3’ terminal.

RNA1, which is ~3.1 kilobases in length, encodes a protein that has multiple functional domains: a mitochondrial targeting domain, a transmembrane domain, an RNA-dependent RNA polymerase (RdRp) domain, a self-interaction domain and an RNA capping domain. In addition, RNA1 encodes a subgenomic RNA3 that encodes protein B2, an RNA silencing inhibitor.

RNA2 encodes protein α, a viral capsid protein precursor, which is auto-cleaved into two mature proteins, a 38 kDa β protein and a 5 kDa γ protein, at a conserved Asn/Ala site during virus assembly.

=== Life cycle ===
Viral replication is cytoplasmic. Entry into the host cell is achieved by penetration into the host cell. Replication follows the positive stranded RNA virus replication model. Positive stranded RNA virus transcription, using the internal initiation model of subgenomic RNA transcription is the method of transcription. Vertebrates and invertebrates serve as the natural host. Transmission routes are contact and contamination.

== Taxonomy ==
The members of the genus Alphanodavirus were originally isolated from insects while those of the genus Betanodavirus were isolated from fish. Flock house virus (FHV), an alphanodavirus, is the best studied of the nodaviruses.

A small number of nodoviruses seem to lie outside either of these clades. A metagenomic study of aqauculture crustaceans identified a large number (including covert mortality nodavirus (CMNV)) of nodaviruses outside the two clades. Some of these nodaviruses have an unpartitioned genome.
