= Nodamuvirales =

Virus classification
- (unranked): Virus
- Realm: Riboviria
- Kingdom: Orthornavirae
- Phylum: Kitrinoviricota
- Class: Magsaviricetes
- Order: Nodamuvirales

Order of viruses

Nodamuvirales is an order of positive-strand RNA viruses which infect eukaryotes. The name of the group is a contraction of "Nodamura virus" and -virales which is the suffix for a virus order.

== Taxonomy ==
The following families are recognized:

- Nodaviridae
- Sinhaliviridae
