= List of Harvard junior fellows =

This list of Harvard junior fellows includes notable recipients of the fellowship.

(* deceased)

== Anthropology ==
- Arthur Demarest
- John L. Jackson Jr.
- Daniel Lieberman
- Michael Silverstein

== Archaeology ==
- George M. A. Hanfmann *

== Art history, architecture ==
- Christopher Alexander
- Whitney Davis
- Michael Fried
- Joseph Koerner
- Christopher S. Wood

== Astronomy, astrophysics ==
- Lawrence H. Aller *
- Charles Bailyn
- James G. Baker *
- Joshua Bloom
- Ewine van Dishoeck
- George B. Field
- Marijn Franx
- Laura Kreidberg
- Ue-Li Pen
- Rosalba Perna
- Edward L. Wright

== Biological sciences ==
- Steven A. Benner
- Howard Berg
- Andrew Berry
- John Tyler Bonner
- Mario Capecchi
- Colleen Cavanaugh
- Yvonne Chen
- Bevil Conway
- Richard H. Ebright
- Kevin Eggan
- Deborah Gordon
- Donald Griffin
- David Haig
- Douglas Hanahan
- Daniel Hochbaum
- Richard A. Howard
- Mireille Kamariza
- Roger D. Kornberg
- George V. Lauder
- Richard Losick
- James R. Morris
- Terence O'Brien
- Joshua B. Plotkin
- Mark Ptashne
- Robert M. Pringle
- Reed C. Rollins
- Gary Ruvkun
- Thomas W. Schoener
- William Schopf
- Carla J. Shatz
- Robert Tjian
- Stephen Vogel
- Carroll M. Williams
- Edward O. Wilson
- Feng Zhang

== Chemistry ==
- Dudley R. Herschbach
- Roald Hoffmann
- Ali Javey
- Walter Kauzmann
- Daniel S. Kemp
- Kevin K. Lehmann
- Stuart A. Rice
- John A. Rogers
- E. Bright Wilson, Jr.*
- Robert B. Woodward *

== Classics ==
- David Pingree *

== Economics ==
- Melissa Dell
- Daniel Ellsberg
- Benjamin M. Friedman
- Roland G. Fryer Jr.
- Carl Kaysen *
- Steven Levitt
- John Lintner *
- Stephen Marglin
- Barry Nalebuff
- Parag Pathak
- Henry Rosovsky
- Jeffrey Sachs
- Paul Samuelson *
- Stefanie Stantcheva
- Peter Temin
- James Tobin *
- Richard Zeckhauser

== Geological sciences ==
- Gordon J. F. MacDonald *

== History, cultural studies ==
- Omer Bartov
- Jamsheed Choksy
- Robert Darnton
- Robin Fleming
- Brad S. Gregory
- Bruce Jackson
- Joseph R. Levenson *
- John C. Miller *
- Roy Mottahedeh
- Eric M. Nelson
- Steve Pincus
- Arthur Schlesinger, Jr. *
- Seth Schwartz
- Ethan H. Shagan
- Paul L. Ward *
- Leon Wieseltier

== History of science ==
- Peter Galison
- Thomas S. Kuhn *
- Frank Sulloway

== Languages and civilizations, Asian ==
- John Nathan

== Languages and literatures, Slavic ==
- Paul Magocsi

== Law ==
- Lucian Bebchuk
- Noah Feldman

== Linguistics ==
- Noam Chomsky
- Alec Marantz

== Literature, comparative ==
- Paul de Man *
- James Kugel
- Albert Lord

== Literature, English ==
- Terry Castle
- Hillary Chute
- Terrence Des Pres
- John Hollander
- Robert McGill
- Maureen McLane
- Cord Meyer
- Richard Wilbur

== Mathematics, mathematical biology ==
- Garrett Birkhoff *
- Robert C. Buck *
- Joel E. Cohen
- Noam Elkies
- Edward Frenkel
- Dennis Gaitsgory
- Paul R. Garabedian
- Ezra Getzler
- Andrew Gleason *
- Robin Hartshorne
- Frances Kirwan
- János Kollár
- Ruth Lawrence-Naimark
- Erez Lieberman Aiden
- Chiu-Chu Melissa Liu
- Barry Mazur
- David B. Mumford
- John C. Oxtoby *
- Clifford Taubes
- Michael Thaddeus
- Jacob Tsimerman
- Stanislaw Ulam *
- Vladimir Voevodsky *
- Thomas Willwacher

== Medicine ==
- Harvey Fineberg
- I. Herbert Scheinberg *

== Music composition, musicology, music theory ==
- Susan Morton Blaustein
- John Harbison
- Robert Kyr
- David B. Lewin *
- Lei Liang
- Eric Sawyer
- Tison Street
- Augusta Read Thomas
- William Cheng
- Peter K. Winkler

== Philosophy, mathematical logic ==
- Elisabeth Camp
- Stanley Cavell *
- Burton Dreben *
- Warren Goldfarb
- Moshe Halbertal
- Jaakko Hintikka *
- Saul Kripke *
- Donald Martin
- Elliott Mendelson
- Martha Nussbaum
- Charles D. Parsons
- Willard Van Orman Quine *
- Hao Wang *

== Physics, applied physics and engineering ==
- Allan Adams
- Stephen Adler
- Ian Affleck
- Vijay Balasubramanian
- John Bardeen *
- Nicolaas Bloembergen
- Lewis M. Branscomb
- Harvey Brooks
- Karin Dahmen
- Louise Dolan
- Peter Elias *
- Melissa Franklin
- S. James Gates, Jr.
- Howard Georgi
- Ivan A. Getting *
- Paul Ginsparg
- Kurt Gottfried
- David Gross
- Steven Gubser
- Paul Horowitz
- Stephen Hsu
- Roman Jackiw
- Shamit Kachru
- David B. Kaplan
- Mehran Kardar
- Vedika Khemani
- Abraham Klein *
- Lawrence Krauss
- Paul Mangelsdorf, Jr.
- Shiraz Minwalla
- Gregory Moore
- Luboš Motl
- Nikita Nekrasov
- Ann Nelson
- David R. Nelson
- Kenneth Nordtvedt
- Michael Peskin
- David Politzer
- Robert V. Pound
- John Preskill
- Joel Primack
- Lisa Randall
- Ramamurti Shankar
- Larry L. Smarr
- Wei Song
- Paul Steinhardt
- Adiel Stern
- Cumrun Vafa
- Kenneth G. Wilson *
- Mark Wise
- Ed Witten
- Tai Tsun Wu

== Physics, artificial intelligence and computer science ==
- Rediet Abebe
- Neil Gershenfeld
- Marvin L. Minsky
- Rohan Murty

== Physiology ==
- Jared Diamond

== Political science ==
- McGeorge Bundy *
- Ray S. Cline *
- Jorge I. Dominguez
- Jacob Hacker
- George Kateb

== Psychology ==
- Drazen Prelec
- Rebecca Saxe
- B. F. Skinner *

== Religious studies ==
- Harold Attridge
- Bentley Layton

== Sociology ==
- Scott Boorman
- Rogers Brubaker
- Matthew Desmond
- George Homans *
- Joseph Rhodes, Jr. *
- Neil J. Smelser *
- Paul Starr
- Sudhir Venkatesh
- Loïc Wacquant
- James Weinrich
- William Foote Whyte *

(* deceased)
