= Daniel Lieberman =

American paleoanthropologist (born 1964)

Daniel Eric Lieberman
- Born: June 3, 1964 (age 62); Cambridge, Massachusetts, U.S.
- Education: Harvard University (BA, MA, PhD); University of Cambridge (MPhil)
- Known for: Human evolution
- Awards: Ig Nobel Prize in Physics (2009)
- Scientific career
- Fields: Paleoanthropology; Biomechanics; Evolutionary medicine
- Workplaces: Rutgers University; George Washington University; Harvard University

Daniel E. Lieberman (born June 3, 1964) is a paleoanthropologist at Harvard University, where he is the Edwin M Lerner II Professor of Biological Sciences, and Professor in the Department of Human Evolutionary Biology. He is best known for his research on running, the evolution of the human head and the human body, and for studying how human evolutionary history, especially in terms of physical activity and diet, can improve human health.

== Biography ==
Lieberman grew up in Connecticut and Rhode Island. After attending Classical High School in Providence, Rhode Island, Lieberman attended Harvard University, where he received his B.A. summa cum laude in biological anthropology (1986) and joint M.A. and Ph.D. degrees in biological anthropology and archaeology (1993). He also received an M.Phil. (1987) from Cambridge University, where he was a Frank Knox Memorial Fellow. Following his Ph.D., he was a Junior Fellow in the Harvard Society of Fellows (1993–1996). He then taught at Rutgers University (1995–1998) and the George Washington University (1998–2001) before becoming a professor at Harvard University in 2001.

In 2009, Lieberman became the founding chair of Harvard University's Department of Human Evolutionary Biology. He served as chair from 2009 to 2018, and from 2022 to 2025. In addition to being director of the Skeletal Biology and Biomechanics Laboratory at Harvard, Lieberman is on the curatorial board of the Peabody Museum of Archaeology and Ethnology, a member of the Department of Organismic and Evolutionary Biology at Harvard, and the Scientific Executive Committee of the L.S.B. Leakey Foundation.

== Scientific work ==
Lieberman has mostly studied how and why the human body evolved to be the way it is, especially in regards to physical activity and diet, and how that evolutionary history is relevant for health.

=== Evolution of the human head ===
For the first half of his career, Lieberman's research primarily focused on integrating comparative and fossil anatomy, experimental biomechanics, and developmental biology to explore hominin craniofacial function and evolution. He summarized much of this research in his 2011 book, The Evolution of the Human Head. A key contribution was to show that many of the features used to classify Homo sapiens result from a more retracted, smaller face which causes a more flexed cranial base that in turn sets up a more globular cranial vault. In other papers, Lieberman with colleagues showed how this integrated configuration has implications for a range of functions and adaptations including speech, swallowing, and head balance during locomotion.

Lieberman has also worked on many other aspects of hominin craniofacial evolution. Of particular note, he worked with Michel Brunet and colleagues to describe and analyze the oldest known hominin species, Sahelanthropus tchadensis, and with David Pilbeam to argue that the first hominins likely evolved from a last common ancestor with chimpanzees that largely resembled extant chimpanzees. Lieberman also published on the challenges of using craniofacial data to reconstruct evolutionary relationships among hominins, and on the evolutionary biomechanics of mastication, including a study with Katherine Zink showing that mechanically processing meat and underground storage organs with Oldowan stone tools considerably increases the efficiency and effectiveness of chewing and likely made possible selection for reduced tooth size in the genus Homo.

=== Skeletal biomechanics ===
Because mechanical forces affect skeletal morphology and vice versa, much of Lieberman's research has tested how behaviors such as chewing, walking and running load the musculoskeletal system and influence how bones grow. Many of these studies involve experimentally testing biomechanical models of human or hominin anatomical variations in humans and model organisms in the lab. Lieberman and colleagues showed that loading from locomotion causes sheep to grow more bone in proximal limb bones almost entirely when they are immature and to repair bone as adults, especially in distal elements. Lieberman and colleagues also showed that the cross-sectional geometry of these bones does not accurately reflect the orientations in which they are loaded. These experiments call into question using cross sections of human and other hominin limb bones to infer how they walked and ran. In other experiments, Lieberman showed that processing food causes the upper and lower jaws to grow less in model organisms (hyraxes) that, like humans, have retracted faces, thus causing dental crowding and increasing the risk of impacted wisdom teeth. Experiments with A. W. Crompton showed that fusion of the mandibular symphysis in primates and other species like wombats transfers forces from muscles on the non-chewing side of the head to increase bite forces.

=== Evolution of human physical activity ===
==== Running ====
Lieberman is best known for his work on the evolution of running. Building off a proposal by David Carrier, he and Dennis Bramble developed the endurance running hypothesis, which proposes that between 3 and 2 million years ago, the genus Homo evolved anatomical and physiological adaptations for long-distance running as part of hunter-gatherer lifestyles. In their 2004 "Born to Run" paper in the journal Nature, entitled "Endurance running and the evolution of Homo", he and Bramble reviewed how effective humans are at distance running, identified a long list of traits that improve endurance running performance, showed that these traits first appear in the genus Homo, especially Homo erectus, and argued that endurance running likely evolved to permit persistence hunting. These traits, which Lieberman and his students and others have studied and tested experimentally in a series of papers, include an enlarged gluteus maximus; short toes; a longitudinal arch in the foot; elongated, spring-like tendons in the leg such as the Achilles and iliotibial band; a nuchal ligament for head stabilization; long legs; lack of fur and an elaboration of sweat glands to permit efficient sweating; mobile rib joints to supplement diaphragmatic ventilation with thoracic ventilation; and a large, thin-walled left ventricle of the heart to maintain high cardiac output.

==== Barefoot running ====
Lieberman also conducted experiments with Madhusudan Venkadesan and others on barefoot versus shod running, showing that many habitually barefoot runners often adopt forefoot or midfoot strikes that reduce the impact peak caused by the collision of the foot with the ground. Lieberman and colleagues have published studies claiming that forefoot or midfoot striking may help prevent some running injuries, and promote stronger feet. These studies have stimulated considerable research on running biomechanics. Lieberman and colleagues also showed that calluses, which barefoot individuals normally develop, protect the foot from injury without compromising mechanosensation. Many of Lieberman's insights on running were popularized in the book Born to Run, but Lieberman has questioned some aspects of the book, including its characterization of Tarahumara running and runners as "the myth of the athletic savage". Lieberman is an avid runner, including marathons. He sometimes runs barefoot, and has studied barefoot running, which earned him the nickname "the Barefoot Professor".

==== Walking ====
Lieberman also worked on the evolution of bipedal walking and posture. In collaboration with Michel Brunet and others, he analyzed the cranium of Sahelanthropus tchadensis, the oldest known hominin species, showing that its inferiorly oriented foramen magnum indicates the species was an upright biped of some sort. With Katherine Whitcome and Liza Shapiro, he showed that hominin females evolved adaptations to cope with the extra load of bearing a fetus during pregnancy. And in conjunction with Anna Warrener and other colleagues, he showed that female humans walk just as efficiently as males despite having wider pelves, contradicting the obstetric dilemma hypothesis.

==== Throwing ====
Lieberman, Neil Roach, Madhusudan Venkadesan and Michael Rainbow showed that the genus Homo evolved unique anatomical features enabling high-speed overhand throwing, including elastic energy storage in a wide, horizontally oriented shoulder, as well as other features such as low humeral torsion, a mobile waist, and hyperextensible wrists. They proposed that these adaptations evolved in Homo erectus for hunting.

==== Metabolism ====
Lieberman's research on physical activity also explores how physical activity affects metabolism and health. His active grandparent hypothesis proposes that human hunter-gatherers evolved to be highly physically active throughout their lifespan, including after they stop reproducing, thereby activating repair and maintenance mechanisms that extend healthspan and lifespan. Using a new method to compare metabolic rates using quotients, Lieberman and colleagues also proposed that humans evolved uniquely high resting, activity, and total metabolic rates by overcoming energy allocation tradeoffs and thermoregulatory constraints that limit other primates, enabling humans to evolve large brains, high reproductive rates, extended longevity, and active lifestyles.

=== Mismatch and dysevolution ===
Lieberman has advanced the concept of evolutionary mismatch, which he defines as "conditions that are more common or severe because the body is inadequately or imperfectly adapted to novel environmental conditions". In his books and many of his papers he synthesizes evidence showing how physical inactivity, energy-dense diets, and other novel environmental factors including highly cushioned shoes contribute to mismatch conditions such as obesity, type 2 diabetes, cardiovascular disease, and flat feet. As an example, in conjunction with Ian Wallace, Lieberman showed that the prevalence of knee osteoarthritis has more than doubled since the mid-20th century, even after accounting for increased longevity and obesity, indicating that recent environmental and lifestyle changes, especially reduced physical activity, substantially increased disease risk. Lieberman divides mismatches into three categories: mismatches of too much (such as sugar), too little (such as physical activity), or too novel (such as tobacco). He further proposes that treating the symptoms not causes of mismatch conditions causes a form of cultural evolution he terms dysevolution, which perpetuates and sometimes worsens the condition.

=== Diet ===
Lieberman is also interested in using evolutionary perspectives to study human diets. In 2023, he and his colleagues showed that the diets of tropical hunter-gatherers are unlike the Paleodiet and much more variable. Lieberman is a co-author on the carbohydrate–insulin model proposed by David Ludwig. His book Fed Up (2026) tells the story of how humans evolved to be the planet's ultimate omnivores but never to choose their food, explores how and why there is no single optimal diet, argues against oversimple diets based primarily on elimination, and reviews the evidence that the healthiest diets are based primarily on unrefined plants.

== Honors and awards ==
- National Merit Scholar, 1982
- Phi Beta Kappa (Harvard College), 1986
- Frank Knox III Memorial Fellowship, 1986–1987
- National Science Foundation Graduate Fellowship, 1987–1990
- Junior Fellowship, Harvard Society of Fellows, 1993–1996
- Everett Mendelsohn Excellence in Mentoring Award, Harvard University, 2009
- Ig Nobel Prize in Physics, 2009 (with Katherine Whitcome and Liza Shapiro)
- Harvard College Professorship, 2010–2015
- American Academy of Arts and Sciences, 2020
- Visiting professor, Collège de France, 2025

== Books ==
- Lieberman, Daniel E. (2011). The Evolution of the Human Head. Cambridge, Massachusetts: Belknap Press. doi:10.2307/j.ctvjnrtmh. ISBN 978-0-674-04636-8.
- Lieberman, Daniel E. (2013). The Story of the Human Body: Evolution, Health and Disease. Pantheon Press. ISBN 978-0-307-74180-6.
- Lieberman, Daniel E. (2021). Exercised: Why Something We Never Evolved to Do Is Healthy and Rewarding. Pantheon Press. ISBN 978-1-5247-4698-8.
- Lieberman, Daniel E. (2026). Fed Up: What Evolution Reveals About Food, Diet, Health, and Eating Well. Knopf. ISBN 978-0-593-53799-2.
