= Megan Frederickson =

Canadian evolutionary biologist

Megan Elizabeth Frederickson
- Education: Harvard University; Stanford University
- Scientific career
- Workplaces: University of Toronto; Harvard University
- Thesis: The intertwined population biology of symbiotic ants and plants in the Amazon (2006)

Megan Frederickson is a Canadian evolutionary biologist who is a professor of Ecology and Evolutionary Biology at the University of Toronto. Her research considers the evolution of cooperation and the ecological genetics of mutualism.

== Early life and education ==
As a teenager, Frederickson volunteered for a rainforest exhibition in an aquarium. Frederickson was an undergraduate student at Harvard University. She graduated in 2001, and moved to the West Coast of the United States for graduate studies. She joined the Department of Biological Sciences at Stanford University as a doctoral student. Her research considered the biology of ants and plants in the Amazon rainforest.

== Research and career ==
Frederickson was inducted into the Harvard Society of Fellows in 2006. At Harvard she worked alongside Naomi Pierce on mutually beneficial relationships in ecology. Together they showed that the ways symbiotic host species employ their symbionts is equivalent to the ways employers treat their workers. The process of mutualism involves species such as plants hosting symbionts such as bacteria. Hosts act to reward cooperative symbionts, such as soybean plants directing food toward specific nodules whilst simultaneously killing off those with unhelpful bacteria. Various theories have been proposed to describe such symbioses, including host sanction theory and partner fidelity feedback. Whilst the former describes a scenario in which the host adapts to punish those who cheat and reward those who cooperate, the latter describes a case where the symbionts evolve to try and please the host. Working with an economist, Pierce and Frederickson showed that employment contract theory and mutualisms could be described by similar mathematics.

Frederickson joined the University of Toronto in 2009, where she developed a high-throughput method to better understand the interactions between microbiomes and their hosts. She showed that over time, microbes evolve to develop more beneficial relationships with their hosts. She studied the relationships between ants and their hosts, showing that ants serve to protect their hosts by monitoring the genes responsible for foraging behaviour. These genes decide how the animal forages for food, and how much benefit the partner plants received. When these genes were activated, the ants recruit more workers to attack herbivores, which ultimately protects plans.

In 2019, Frederickson returned to Harvard University as a medical fellow in the Harvard Radcliffe Institute. During her fellowship she worked on a book that explored the concept of mutualism in ecology, and how it can be used to better understand the microbiome.

Frederickson has written for The Conversation. During the COVID-19 pandemic, she wrote about how people with caring responsibilities – mainly women – could not simultaneously balance home schooling, online teaching and scientific research.

== Selected publications ==
- Jon G Sanders; Scott Powell; Daniel J C Kronauer; Heraldo L Vasconcelos; Megan E Frederickson; Naomi E Pierce (6 January 2014). "Stability and phylogenetic correlation in gut microbiota: lessons from ants and apes". Molecular Ecology. 23 (6): 1268–1283. doi:10.1111/mec.12611. ISSN 0962-1083. PMID 24304129. Wikidata Q35058796.
- Marco Archetti; István Scheuring; Moshe Hoffman; Megan E Frederickson; Naomi E Pierce; Douglas W Yu (20 October 2011). "Economic game theory for mutualism and cooperation". Ecology Letters. 14 (12): 1300–1312. doi:10.1111/j.1461-0248.2011.01697.x. ISSN 1461-023X. PMID 22011186. Wikidata Q34051578.
- Megan E Frederickson; Michael J Greene; Deborah M Gordon (1 September 2005). "Ecology: 'Devil's gardens' bedevilled by ants". Nature. 437 (7058): 495–496. doi:10.1038/437495a. ISSN 1476-4687. PMID 16177778. Wikidata Q39011234.
