= List of Black Harvard junior fellows =

This list of junior fellows at the Harvard Society of Fellows includes notable recipients of the fellowship who are Black. As of 2019, there had been fewer than 20 Black fellows out of over 700 total junior fellows since the Society's founding in 1933.

The symbol * following a name indicates that that person is deceased.

- 1969 Joseph Rhodes, Jr.* (Sociology)
- 1977 Sylvester James Gates (Theoretical Physics)
- 1993 Thomas Stewart (Government)
- 1999 John Jackson (Anthropology)
- 2002 Nadya Mason (Condensed Matter Physics)
- 2003 Roland G. Fryer Jr. (Economics)
- 2014 Isaiah Andrews (Economics)
- 2016 Joshua Bennett (English)
- 2016, 2019 Anthony A. Jack (Sociology)
- 2018 Sarah Derbew (Classics)
- 2019 Rediet Abebe (Computer Science)
- 2019 Mireille Kamariza (Biology)
- 2020 Camille Owens (African American & American Studies)
