= David Ludwig =

David Ludwig may refer to:

- David Ludwig (physician) (born 1957), American physician
- David Ludwig (composer) (born 1974), American composer
- David Ludwig (herpetologist)
