= Deborah Gordon (disambiguation) =

Deborah or Debbie Gordon may refer to:

- Deborah M. Gordon, biologist at Stanford University who studies ant colony behavior and ecology
- Debbie Gordon, Brookside character
- Debbie Gordon, former member of The Dicks
