= Community Builders Group =

Non-profit housing provider in Vancouver, British Columbia

- Formation: 1983; 43 years ago
- Type: Non-profit organization
- Headquarters: Vancouver, British Columbia
- Services: Supportive housing, employment services, wellness programs
- Executive Director: Julie Roberts
- Website: https://communitybuilders.ca/

Community Builders Group is a non-profit organization based in Vancouver, British Columbia, that provides supportive housing, services, and opportunities for individuals experiencing homelessness.

== History ==
Community Builders Group was registered as a Canadian charity in 1983 and subsequently incorporated under the Society Act of British Columbia.

Philanthropic investments allowed the group to purchase two supportive housing centres in Vancouver, Canada: the Jubilee Rooms on Main Street and the Dodson Rooms on Hastings. Between 2002 and 2016, a total of 12 housing centres, supporting 800 persons, were added to the Community Builders network in Vancouver. Between 2012 and 2016, three new organizations (Anhart Foundation, Community Builders Foundation and Simpson Society) were established in order to support the growing number of housing centres and social employment businesses.

In 2005, Human Resources and Skills Development Canada, Anhart Holdings Ltd. and Community Builders Group sponsored a research project to determine the effects of best practices in privately owned rooming houses on persons at risk to homelessness. In 2008, Community Builders began receiving funding from the Homelessness Partnering Strategy; the organization became a member of the Canadian International Development Agency in 2009.

In late 2024 and 2025, Community Builders Group expanded its operations in Vancouver's downtown core, assuming management of the Gastown Hotel (December 2024) and The Luugat (September 2025). During this period, the organization's planned projects faced regional policy shifts, including the City of Vancouver's February 2025 proposal to pause the development of new supportive housing units. This motion affected a scheduled 64-unit development overseen by the group. Additionally, the group continued development on the East Keith Road project in North Vancouver, a 60-unit site focusing on complex care housing.

== Operational activities ==
=== Supportive housing ===
As of 2026, Community Builders operates sixteen buildings with over 1,000 beds across the Lower Mainland, including shelters, supportive and affordable housing. Fifteen of the buildings are located in Vancouver, while one is located in Richmond. Operations are coordinated by tenant support workers, and the organization uses a bottom-up approach to building management, with a tenant-based "elders" team that offers peer support and regulates tenant affairs. The initiative is supported by public and private capital investments, and is assisted by community volunteers and innovative social services providers. Outcomes of Community Builders supportive housing efforts include a reduction in the risk factors that lead to homelessness (untreated mental illness and substance abuse) and a recidivism rate (return to homelessness) of less than 5%.

Dodson Hotel (25 E. Hastings St): A 71-unit SRO revitalized by Anhart in 2004. While the building is owned by Anhart (via the Dodson Foundation), it is operated by Community Builders Group under their "Whole Life Housing" model.

=== Parent and Child Development Services ===
In 2006, Community Builders developed an initiative that supports at-risk children and parents in Greater Vancouver with housing and independent living assistance. Parent and Child Development Services is cost-effective and privately funded. The initiative provides an alternative to government-funded support services for parents and children.

=== International relief and development ===
Community Builders previously operated internationally in Haiti, Kenya, Zambia, Tanzania, Democratic Republic of the Congo, and El Salvador. These efforts began in 1998 and included field visits to areas of extreme poverty, as well as project design and implementation.

== Partnerships ==
Community Builders Group maintains a long-standing development partnership with Anhart (formerly the Anhart Foundation). In this model, Anhart typically revitalizes or develops the real estate assets, while Community Builders Group manages the daily operations and support services. Key collaborative projects include the Dodson Hotel and the 2018 mixed-income development at 179 Main Street.

== Sociological modeling of emergence ==
Community Builders has pioneered research in a sociological modeling of emergence and has observed the effects of self-organization on groups of marginalized persons.

A 2005, the Community Builders' research initiative entitled "A Sociological Modeling of Emergence" performed a longitudinal survey of 140 persons at risk to homelessness in Vancouver's Downtown Eastside. The study established a Gold Standard of best practices for privately owned rooming houses and found that tenants experienced a 40-60% reduction in addiction and mental illness rates following a six-month stay in rooming houses which utilized best practices.

Another research paper entitled "Emergent models of wellness: a case study of management practices in single occupant hotels of Vancouver CA" (Alexiuk, M.D., Wiebe, G.K. And Pizzi, N.J.) was submitted to the Canadian Conference on Electrical and Computer Engineering, 2005.

Alexiuk, Wiebe and Pizzi utilized results of the aforementioned longitudinal study and argued that "The theory of emergence has become a useful framework for exploring salient features of dynamical systems. This framework provides insight into hitherto intractable problems in sociology and economics. One such problem is the definition of a mathematical model of homelessness that enables policy evaluation with respect to the holistic wellness of the impacted individuals. Swarm simulations provide numerical and visual results to the researcher allowing both quantitative and intuitive hypothesis testing. This paper defines a basic swarm model of homelessness, details some initial experiments and provides justification for a dynamical systems model."

Suggested reading on the Community Builders website includes: Harold Morowitz (The Emergence of Everything) and the descriptions of self-organizing societies by Jane Jacobs (The Death and Life of Great American Cities) and Deborah Gordon (Ants at Work).
