= Terrence Des Pres =

American historian

Terrence Des Pres (1939 – November 16, 1987) was an American writer and Holocaust scholar.

== Life ==
Terrence Des Pres was born in Effingham, Illinois in 1939. He graduated from Southeast Missouri State College in 1962. He went on to graduate study in philosophy at Washington University in St. Louis, completing his doctorate there in 1968.

He was appointed a junior fellow in the Society of Fellows at Harvard University, where he formed a friendship with John Nathan. Des Pres served as the society's sommelier.

He was married twice, and had a son with his first wife.

== Work ==
Beginning in 1973 Des Pres was a professor at Colgate University, where he held the William Henry Crawshaw Chair in Literature; he taught classes on poetry, British and Irish literature, and the literature of the Holocaust. At Colgate, he spent time with writer Frederick Busch.

Des Pres is best known for his work on the Holocaust documented in his book The Survivor: An Anatomy of Life in the Death Camps.

He also wrote Praises & Dispraises, published posthumously in 1988, which dealt with poetry and its usefulness for survival.

== Death ==
Des Pres died on November 16, 1987, at his home in Hamilton, New York. John Nathan refers to the death in his memoir as a suicide. Des Pres's death was ruled "accidental" by the Madison County medical examiners' office, Madison, NY. According to a 1990 Boston Globe article, he died by hanging.

After his death, poet Paul Mariani spoke at a service for Des Pres at Colgate, where they may have spent time together as Mariani worked on his master's degree.

== See also ==
- List of Harvard Junior Fellows
- Carolyn Forché, who was influenced by Des Pres, and organized the "Genocide and Memory" conference in 1997, where Des Pres was remembered. Her poem "Ourselves or Nothing" is about Des Pres.
- Peter Balakian, poet and Colgate professor, also organized the 1997 "Genocide and Memory conference. In addition to their Colgate connection, Balakian is of Armenian descent, and Des Pres' work with survival literature included the Armenian genocide.
- Paul Mariani, poet, wrote the introduction to Des Pres' collection of essays "Writing Into the World"
- Geoffrey Hartman, professor at Yale University, had interviewed Des Pres and presented a video of it at the "Genocide and Memory" conference along with a paper.

== Bibliography ==
- The Survivor: An Anatomy of Life in the Death Camps. New York: Oxford University Press. 1976. ISBN 0-19-501952-0.; reprint, Oxford University Press, 1980, ISBN 978-0-19-502703-7
- Praises & dispraises: poetry and politics, the 20th century. Viking. 1988. ISBN 978-0-670-80406-1.
- Writing into the World. New York: Viking. 1991. foreword by Elie Wiesel ISBN 0-670-80464-9
- "Remembering Armenia" to introduce The Armenian Genocide in Perspective. edited by Richard G. Hovannisian Transaction Publishers: 1986. ISBN 0-88738-636-9 ISBN 978-0-88738-636-7
- "Introduction" for Treblinka: The inspiring story of the 600 Jews who revolted against their murderers and burned a Nazi death camp to the ground, by Jean-Francois Steiner. Plume, 1994. ISBN 0-452-01124-8

=== Edited ===
- Reginald Gibbons; Terrence Des Pres, eds. (1992). Thomas McGrath: life and the poem. University of Illinois Press. ISBN 978-0-252-01852-7.

== Awards ==
- 1978: National Jewish Book Award in the Holocaust category for The Survivor: An Anatomy of Life in the Death Camps
