= Frederickson =

Frederickson is a surname. Notable people with the surname include:

- David Frederickson (born 1944), American politician
- Dennis Frederickson (born 1939), American politician
- Dennis C. Frederickson (1931–2017), American politician
- Elizabeth Diane Frederickson Diane Downs (born 1955), American convicted murderer
- Gray Frederickson (1937–2022), American film producer
- H. George Frederickson (1934–2020), American academic
- Mark Frederickson (born 1960), American soccer player
- Megan Frederickson, Canadian evolutionary biologist
- Tucker Frederickson (born 1943), American football player

== See also ==
- Frederickson, Washington, census-designated place in Pierce County, Washington, United States
