= Andrea Bertozzi =

American mathematician

- Born: 1965 (age 60–61); Boston, Massachusetts
- Education: Princeton University
- Relatives: Carolyn Bertozzi (sister)
- Scientific career
- Fields: Mathematics
- Workplaces: University of California, Los Angeles; Duke University; Argonne National Laboratory; University of Chicago
- Thesis: Existence, uniqueness, and a characterization of solutions to the contour dynamics equation (1991)
- Doctoral advisor: Andrew Majda

Andrea Louise Bertozzi (born 1965) is an American mathematician. Her research interests are in non-linear partial differential equations and applied mathematics.

== Education and career ==
She earned her bachelor's and master's degrees from Princeton University, followed by her PhD from Princeton in 1991; her dissertation was titled Existence, Uniqueness, and a Characterization of Solutions to the Contour Dynamics Equation. Prior to joining UCLA in 2003, Bertozzi was an L. E. Dickson Instructor at the University of Chicago, and then Professor of Mathematics and Physics at Duke University. She spent one year at Argonne National Laboratory as the Maria Goeppert-Mayer Distinguished Scholar.

She is a member of the faculty of the University of California, Los Angeles, as a professor of mathematics (since 2003) and Mechanical and Aerospace Engineering (since 2018) and Director of Applied Mathematics (since 2005). She is a member of the California NanoSystems Institute.

== Contributions ==
Bertozzi has contributed to many areas of applied mathematics, including the theory of swarming behavior, aggregation equations and their solution in general dimension, the theory of particle-laden flows in liquids with free surfaces, data analysis/image analysis at the micro and nano scales, and the mathematics of crime. Her earlier fundamental work in fluids led to novel applications in image processing, most notably image inpainting, swarming models, and data clustering on graphs.

Bertozzi coauthored the book Vorticity and Incompressible Flow, which was published in 2000 and remains one of her most cited works.

Bertozzi now has over 200 publications on Web of Science, covering a range of topics including fluid dynamics, image processing, social sciences, and cooperative motion. Bertozzi's publications include over 100 collaborators in a wide range of disciplines including Mathematics, Applied Mathematics, Statistics, Computer Science, Chemistry, Physics, Mechanical and Aerospace Engineering, Medicine, Anthropology, Economics, Politics, and Criminology.

Between 2010 and 2020, Bertozzi has been granted multiple patents related to her research, which center on image inpainting, data fusion mapping estimation, and most recently, on determining fluid reservoir connectivity using nanowire probes.

Bertozzi has developed numerous novel mathematical theories throughout her career. While a Dickson Instructor at Univ. of Chicago, she developed the mathematical theory of thin film equations, fourth order degenerate parabolic equations that are used to describe lubrication theory for coating flows. She has also worked with Jeffrey Brantingham and other colleagues to apply mathematics to the patterns of urban crime, research which was the cover feature in the March 2, 2010 issue of Proceedings of the National Academy of Sciences. Bertozzi also spoke about the mathematics of crime at the 2010 annual meeting of the American Association for the Advancement of Science. Since 2017, Bertozzi has been developing new mathematics related to microfluidic technologies as part of her Simons Math + X investigator program joint with UCLA's Department of Mechanical and Aerospace Engineering and the California NanoSystems Institute. That work includes the theory of transient growth for linear stability of driven contact lines and the theory of undercompressive shocks in driven films with nonconvex fluxes. In 2020, she applied these ideas to discover a new class of undercompressive shock solutions in the "tears of wine" problem.

Bertozzi has also published academic works regarding the 2020 pandemic, the most significant of which is an article on the difficulties of forecasting the spread of COVID-19. She has continued making contributions to the scientific community throughout the pandemic, including a talk on epidemic modeling and a study on the increase in domestic violence reports during stay-at-home restrictions.

== Personal life ==
She is the older sister of the chemist and Nobel laureate (2022) Carolyn Bertozzi. Her father, William Bertozzi, was a professor of physics at the Massachusetts Institute of Technology.

== Recognition ==
In 1995, Bertozzi received a research fellowship from the Sloan Foundation. In 1996, she received the Presidential Early Career Award for Scientists and Engineers from the U.S. Office of Naval Research. She was also awarded the 2009 Association for Women in Mathematics-Society for Industrial and Applied Mathematics Sonia Kovalevsky Lecture, and was elected a Society for Industrial and Applied Mathematics Fellow in 2010.

In 2010, she was elected to the American Academy of Arts and Sciences. In 2012, she became a fellow of the American Mathematical Society. In 2013, she was named the Betsy Wood Knapp Chair for Innovation and Creativity at UCLA. In 2016, she became a Fellow of the American Physical Society. In 2017, she became a Simons Investigator. In 2018, she was elected to the US National Academy of Sciences. In 2019, she was awarded SIAM's Kleinman Prize.

== Cancellation of Noether Lecture ==
In June 2020, it was announced that Bertozzi was invited to give the Noether Lecture at the 2021 Joint Mathematics Meetings. Her selection as lecturer came under scrutiny because of her work in the controversial area of predictive policing. The timing of the announcement, during the George Floyd protests against police brutality, was criticized on social media as offensive. Bertozzi came to a mutual decision with the sponsors of the event (the Association for Women in Mathematics and the American Mathematical Society) to cancel the lecture.
