= Lara Mahal =

American chemist

Lara K. Mahal
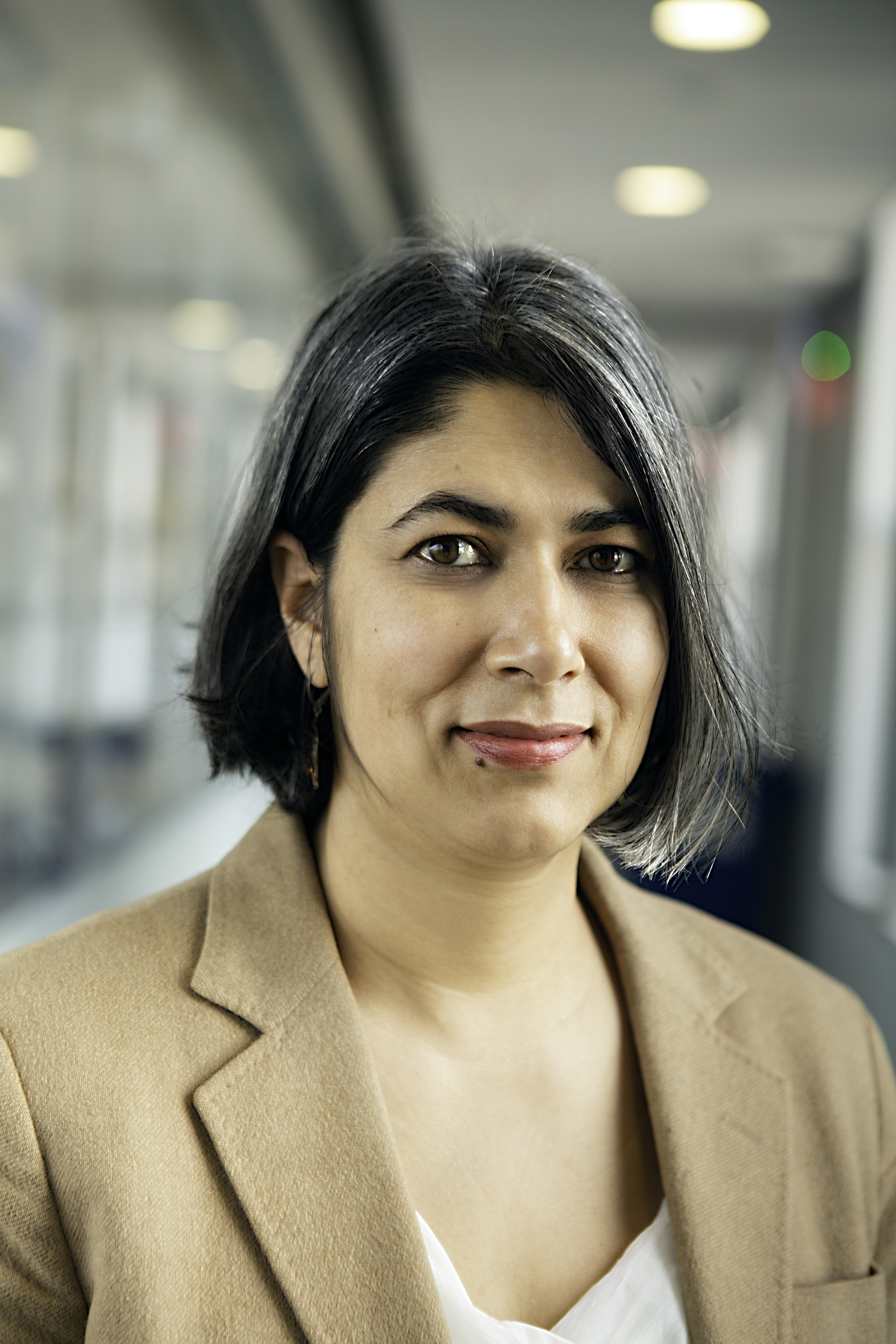
- Education: University of California, Santa Cruz; University of California, Berkeley
- Known for: lectin microarrays in glycomics miRNA regulation of glycosylation unnatural carbohydrate incorporation
- Children: 2
- Awards: CERC in Glycomics (2019-) Horace Isbell Award in Carbohydrate Chemistry (2017) NIH Director New Innovator Award (2008) Sloan Foundation Fellowship (2008) NSF CAREER Award (2007) Beckman Young Investigator (2004) Jane Coffin Childs Postdoctoral Fellow (2000) ACS Medicinal Chemistry Predoctoral Fellow (1998) UC Regents Scholar (1993)
- Scientific career
- Workplaces: University of Alberta; New York University; University of Texas at Austin
- Thesis: Biosynthetic modulation of cell surface sialosides (2000)
- Doctoral advisor: Carolyn Bertozzi

Lara K. Mahal is an American chemist who is the Canada Excellence Research Chair in Glycomics at the University of Alberta in Edmonton, Alberta, Canada. She is also a Professor of Chemistry at the University of Alberta. She is notable both for her pioneering work establishing lectin microarrays as a new technology for glycomics, her work on miRNA regulation of glycosylation and her graduate work with Carolyn R. Bertozzi on unnatural carbohydrate incorporation. Work in her laboratory focuses on understanding the role of carbohydrates in human health using systems- and chemical biology-based approaches

== Academia ==
Mahal received her B.A. in Chemistry at the University of California, Santa Cruz in 1995. As an undergraduate, she worked on organic free radical chemistry in the laboratory of Professor Rebecca Braslau. In 1995, Professor Mahal joined the newly formed laboratory of Professor Bertozzi at the University of California, Berkeley where she worked on the incorporation of unnatural functionalized sialic acid derivatives onto the surface of cells. For this landmark work, Professor Mahal was awarded and American Chemical Society Medicinal Chemistry Pre-doctoral Fellowship. After graduating in 2001, Professor Mahal did postdoctoral research on neuronal exocytosis in the laboratory of Professor Jim Rothman at Memorial Sloan-Kettering Cancer Research Center. During this time Professor Mahal was a Jane Coffins Child Cancer Research Fellow.

In 2003, Mahal joined the faculty of the University of Texas at Austin as an Assistant Professor of Chemistry and Biochemistry. Tenured in 2009, she then joined the faculty of New York University as an Associate Professor of Chemistry in the Biomedical Chemistry Institute. She was promoted to Professor in 2016. In 2019, Mahal became the Canada Excellence Research Chair in Glycomics at the University of Alberta. Beyond the CERC, Mahal has received several major awards, including the Beckman Young Investigators Award (2004), an NSF Career Award (2007), the Sloan Foundation Fellowship (2008), the 2008 NIH Director's New Innovator Award and the Horace S. Isbell Award in Carbohydrate Chemistry (2017).
