= Andrew Berry (biologist) =

British evolutionary biologist

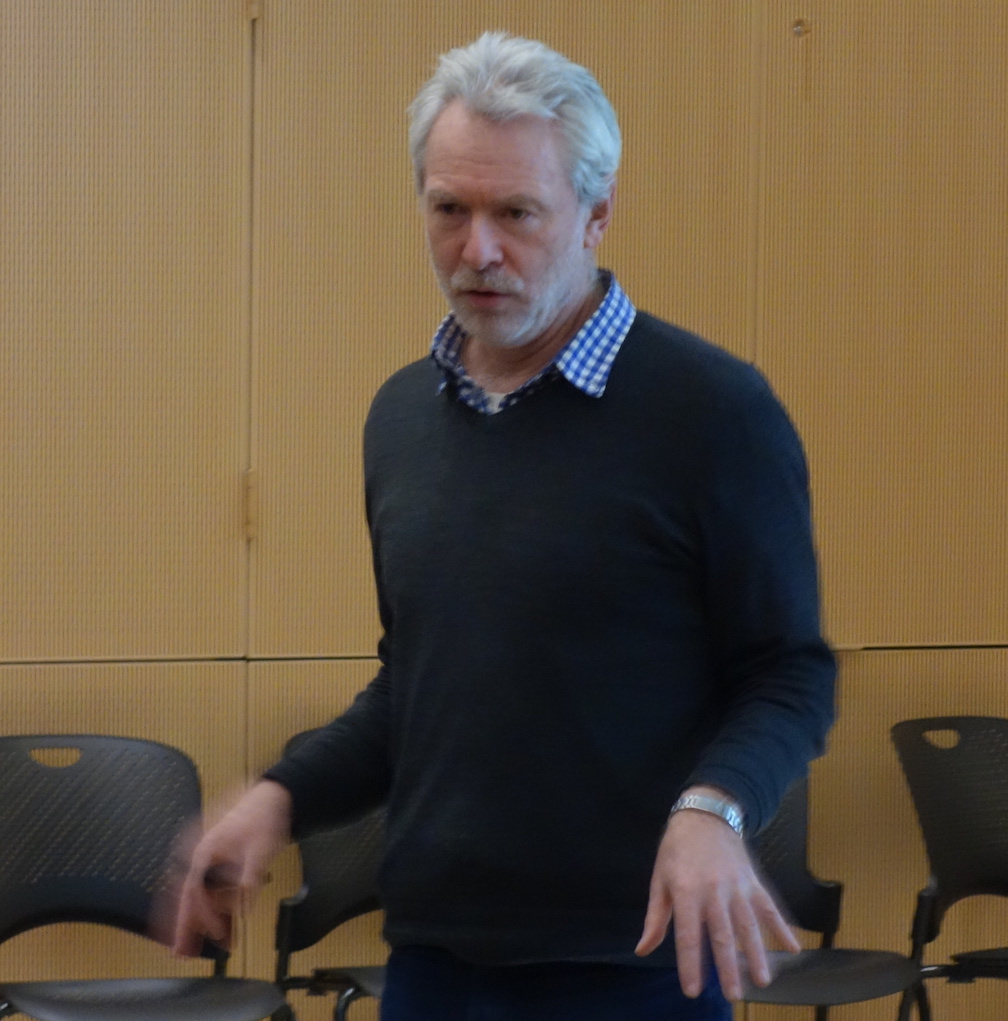
- Andrew Berry speaking at MIT on Darwin Day 2019
- Born: July 11, 1963 (age 63); London, England
- Education: University of Oxford, Princeton University
- Known for: Alfred Wallace history
- Scientific career
- Fields: Genetics, History of Science
- Workplaces: Harvard University

Andrew Berry (born 1963) is a British evolutionary biologist and historian of science with a particular interest in Alfred Russel Wallace. Previously, he was a Junior Fellow at the Harvard Society of Fellows and he is currently a lecturer in Organismic and Evolutionary Biology at Harvard University.

== Early life ==
Andrew Berry was born in 1963 in London. His father is biologist R. J. Berry. He was educated at Shrewsbury School and then studied Zoology at St John's College, Oxford. He did his PhD under Martin Kreitman in evolutionary genetics at Princeton University. At Harvard, he did post-doctoral work in Richard Lewontin's lab.

== Career ==
Berry's research combined field and laboratory methods to detect positive Darwinian selection (i.e. adaptive evolution) at the molecular level in natural populations. In addition to technical articles, he has published in the London Review of Books, Slate, and elsewhere. He has published two books: Infinite tropics: an Alfred Russel Wallace anthology, 2003, with a foreword written by Stephen Jay Gould, and DNA: The Secret of Life with James Watson, 2003. In addition to lecturing at Harvard, he also leads a Harvard Summer Study Abroad program at Queen's College, Oxford on the history of evolutionary biology and on current ideas in the field. He teaches evolutionary biology regularly at Sabancı University in Istanbul, Turkey, and is accordingly targeted by Turkish creationist organizations.

Berry has worked on the script development for several major TV shows: Race, the Power of an Illusion in 2003 by PBS, the 5-part Channel 4 DNA, and NOVA's Lord of the Ants. In 2013, along with George Beccaloni, curator with a special interest in Orthopteroidea and the Alfred Russel Wallace collections at the Natural History Museum, London, Berry narrated a short animated film for The New York Times to celebrate the Alfred Russel Wallace's centenary.

== Personal life ==
He is married to Harvard Professor Naomi Pierce, and they have twin children.

Berry was pranked during a comedy video where YouTuber, JiDion crashed a Life Sciences lecture.
