= Carolyn Bertozzi =

American chemist (born 1966)

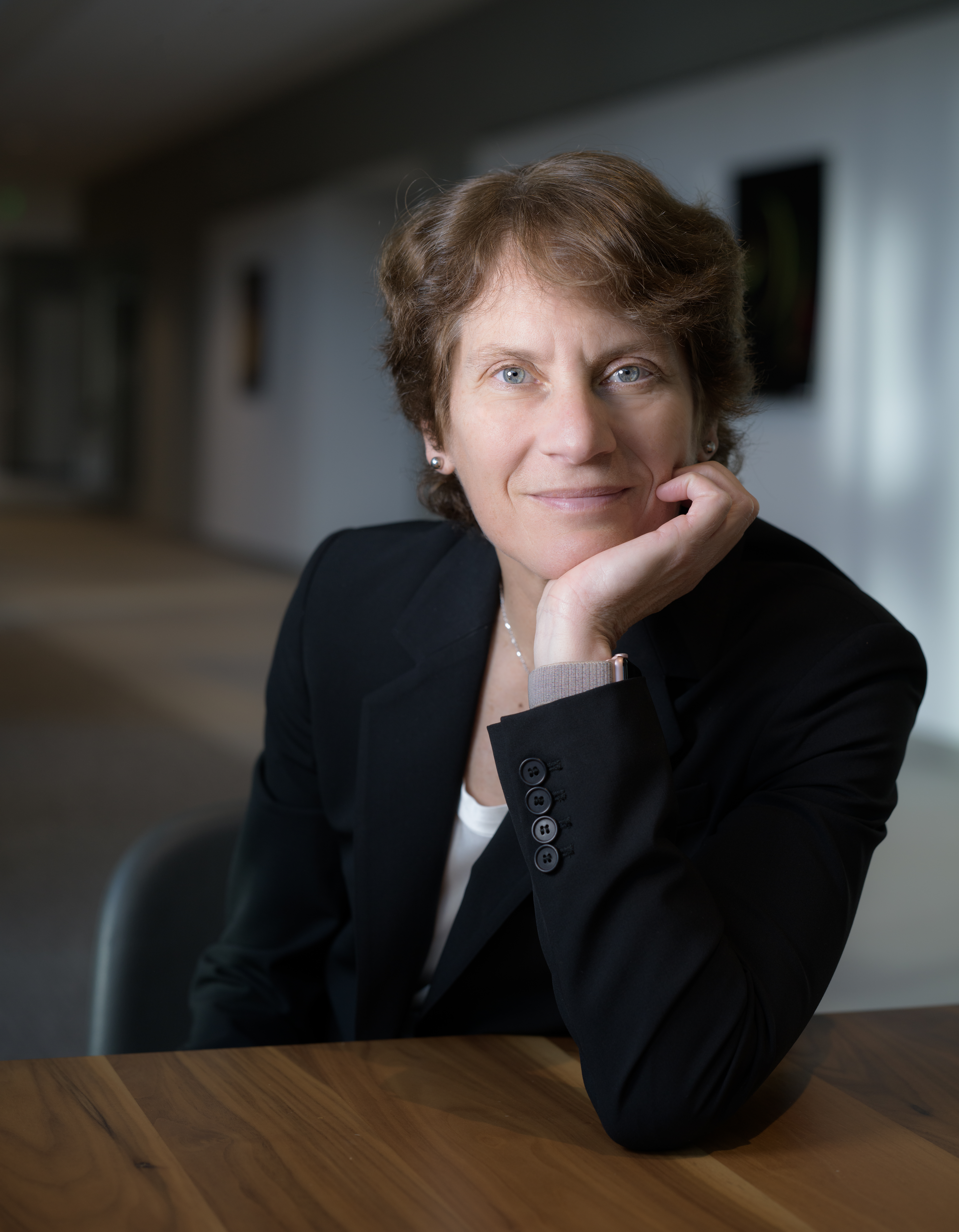
- Bertozzi in 2022
- Born: Carolyn Ruth Bertozzi; October 10, 1966 (age 60); Boston, Massachusetts, U.S.
- Education: Harvard University (BA); University of California, Berkeley (MS, PhD)
- Known for: Bioorthogonal chemistry
- Relatives: Andrea Bertozzi (sister)
- Awards: ACS Award in Pure Chemistry (2001); Lemelson–MIT Prize (2010); Heinrich Wieland Prize (2012); Wolf Prize (2022); Dickson Prize (2022); Welch Award in Chemistry (2022); Nobel Prize in Chemistry (2022)
- Scientific career
- Fields: Chemistry
- Workplaces: Stanford University; University of California, Berkeley; Lawrence Berkeley National Laboratory; University of California, San Francisco
- Thesis: Synthesis and biological activity of carbon-linked glycosides (1993)
- Doctoral advisor: Mark D. Bednarski
- Doctoral students: Howard Hang; Mireille Kamariza; Lara Mahal; Jennifer Prescher

External videos
- "What the sugar coating on your cells is trying to tell you", TEDx Stanford
- "Carolyn R. Bertozzi Wins 2022 AAAS Lifetime Mentor Award", AAAS, February 10, 2022

Carolyn Ruth Bertozzi (born October 10, 1966) is an American chemist and Nobel laureate, known for her wide-ranging work spanning both chemistry and biology. She coined the term "bioorthogonal chemistry" for chemical reactions compatible with living systems, and is a major figure in the field of glycobiology, the study of structural carbohydrates or glycans. Her work focuses on developing tools of analytical chemistry to study glycans and their role in diseases such as cancer, inflammation, and viral infections like COVID-19. At Stanford University, she holds the Anne T. and Robert M. Bass Professorship in the School of Humanities and Sciences. Bertozzi is also an Investigator at the Howard Hughes Medical Institute (HHMI) and is the former director of the Molecular Foundry, a nanoscience research center at Lawrence Berkeley National Laboratory. Since 2024, she has served as a scientific advisory board member of Arc Institute.

She received the MacArthur "genius" award at age 33. In 2010, she was the first woman to receive the Lemelson–MIT Prize faculty award. She is a member of the National Academy of Sciences (2005), the Institute of Medicine (2011), and the National Academy of Inventors (2013). In 2014, it was announced that Bertozzi would lead ACS Central Science, the American Chemical Society's first peer-reviewed open access journal, which offers all content free to the public. Since 2021 she has been a member of the Accademia dei Lincei.

Bertozzi was awarded the 2022 Nobel Prize in Chemistry, jointly with Morten P. Meldal and Karl Barry Sharpless, "for the development of click chemistry and bioorthogonal chemistry".

== Education ==
Carolyn Bertozzi received her B.A., summa cum laude, in chemistry from Harvard University, where she worked with Professor Joe Grabowski on the design and construction of a photoacoustic calorimeter. Grabowski was impressed with her work and required Bertozzi to write a thesis on this project, which was submitted and Bertozzi won the Thomas T. Hoopes Undergraduate Thesis Prize. While an undergraduate, she played in several bands, notably Bored of Education with future Rage Against the Machine guitarist Tom Morello. After graduating from Harvard in 1988, she worked at Bell Labs with Chris Chidsey.

Bertozzi completed her Ph.D. in chemistry at University of California, Berkeley in 1993 with Mark Bednarski, working on the chemical synthesis of oligosaccharide analogs. While at Berkeley, she discovered that viruses can bind to sugars in the body. The discovery led to her field of research, glycobiology. During Bertozzi's third year of graduate school, Bednarski was diagnosed with colon cancer, which resulted in him taking a leave of absence and changing his career path by enrolling in medical school. This left Bertozzi and the rest of the lab to complete their Ph.D. work with no direct supervision.

== Career and research ==
After graduating from Berkeley with a Ph.D., Bertozzi was a postdoctoral fellow at University of California, San Francisco (UCSF) with Steven Rosen, where she studied the activity of endothelial oligosaccharides in promoting cell adhesion at inflammation sites. While working with Rosen at UCSF, Bertozzi was able to modify the protein and sugar molecules in the walls of living cells so that the cells accept foreign materials such as implants.

In 1996, Bertozzi became a faculty member in the UC Berkeley College of Chemistry and a faculty scientist at Lawrence Berkeley National Laboratory, where she served as the director of the Molecular Foundry. She has been an investigator with HHMI since 2000. In 1999, while working with HHMI and at Berkeley, she founded the field of bioorthogonal chemistry and coined the term in 2003. This new field and technique allows researchers to chemically modify molecules in living organisms and not interrupt the processes of the cell. In 2015, Bertozzi moved to Stanford University to join the ChEM-H Institute.

Bertozzi studies the glycobiology of underlying diseases such as cancer, inflammatory disorders such as arthritis, and infectious diseases such as tuberculosis. In particular, Bertozzi has advanced the understanding of cell surface oligosaccharides involved in cell recognition and inter-cellular communication. Bertozzi has applied the techniques of bioorthogonal chemistry to study glycocalyx, the sugars that surround the cell membrane. Her discoveries have advanced the field of biotherapeutics. Her lab has also developed tools for research. One such development is creating chemical tools for studying glycans in living systems. In 2018, her lab reported a solvatochromic trehalose probe for the rapid detection of Mycobacterium tuberculosis in sputum. In 2017, due to her lab's discovery of linking the sugars on the surface of cancer cells and their ability to avoid the immune system defenses, she was invited to speak at Stanford's TED talk, giving a talk entitled "What the sugar coating on your cells is trying to tell you".

=== Biotechnology startups ===
In 2001, Bertozzi and Steve Rosen co-founded Thios Pharmaceuticals in Emeryville, California, the first company to target sulfation pathways. Thios Pharmaceuticals dissolved in 2005.

In 2008, Bertozzi co-founded Redwood Bioscience, also in Emeryville, California, with her former graduate student David Rabuka. Redwood Bioscience is a biotechnology company that uses SMARTag, a site-specific protein modification technology that allows small drugs to attach to sites on the proteins and can be used to help fight cancers. Redwood Bioscience was acquired by Catalent Pharma Solutions in 2014. Bertozzi remains a part of the advisory board for the biologics sector of the company.

In 2014, she co-founded Enable Biosciences of South San Francisco, California. It focuses on biotechnologies for at-home diagnoses for type 1 diabetes, HIV, and other diseases.

Bertozzi became a co-founder of Palleon Pharma of Waltham, Massachusetts, in 2015. Palleon Pharma focuses on investigating glycoimmune checkpoint inhibitors as a potential treatment for cancer.

In 2017, Bertozzi helped found InterVenn Biosciences, which uses mass spectrometry and artificial intelligence to enhance glycoproteomics for target and biomarker discovery, ovarian cancer diagnostics, and predicting the successes and failures of clinical trials.

She co-founded the Grace Science Foundation in 2018. The foundation focuses on curing NGLY1 deficiency through developing therapeutics that are efficient and inexpensive.

In 2019, she co-founded both OliLux Biosciences and Lycia Therapeutics. OliLux Biosciences develops new methods for tuberculosis detection. The founding of Lycia Therapeutics occurred when Bertozzi's group discovered lysosome-targeting chimeras (LYTACs). The new molecule class may be able to degrade some cardiovascular disease and cancer targets. Lycia Therapeutics focuses on developing technology which utilizes lysosome-targeting chimeras (LYTACs).

Bertozzi served on Eli Lilly's board of directors from 2017 to 2021, including on its Science and Technology Committee, and resigned after Lilly entered a licensing agreement with Lycia Therapeutics, which she co-founded. She has also served on the research advisory boards of pharmaceutical companies including GlaxoSmithKline, and on the scientific advisory board of Colossal Biosciences since 2021.

=== Publications ===
Bertozzi has over 600 publications on Web of Science; the most cited are:

- Sletten, EM; Bertozzi, CR (2009). "Bioorthogonal Chemistry: Fishing for Selectivity in a Sea of Functionality". Angewandte Chemie International Edition in English. 48 (38): 6974–98. Bibcode:2009ACIE...48.6974S. doi:10.1002/anie.200900942. PMC 2864149. PMID 19714693.
- Bertozzi, Carolyn R.; Kiessling, Laura L. (2001). "Chemical Glycobiology". Science. 291 (5512): 2357–64. Bibcode:2001Sci...291.2357B. doi:10.1126/science.1059820. PMID 11269316. S2CID 9585674.
- Saxon, Eliana; Bertozzi, Carolyn R. (2000). "Cell Surface Engineering by a Modified Staudinger Reaction". Science. 287 (5460): 2007–10. Bibcode:2000Sci...287.2007S. doi:10.1126/science.287.5460.2007. PMID 10720325. S2CID 19720277.
- Agard, Nicholas J.; Prescher, Jennifer A.; Bertozzi, Carolyn R. (2005). "A Strain-Promoted [3 + 2] Azide−Alkyne Cycloaddition for Covalent Modification of Biomolecules in Living Systems". Journal of the American Chemical Society. 126 (46): 15046–15047. doi:10.1021/ja044996f. PMID 15547999.
- Dube, DH; Bertozzi, CR (2005). "Glycans in cancer and inflammation—potential for therapeutics and diagnostics". Nature Reviews Drug Discovery. 4 (6): 477–88. Bibcode:2005NRvDD...4..477D. doi:10.1038/nrd1751. PMID 15931257. S2CID 22525932.

=== Awards and honors ===
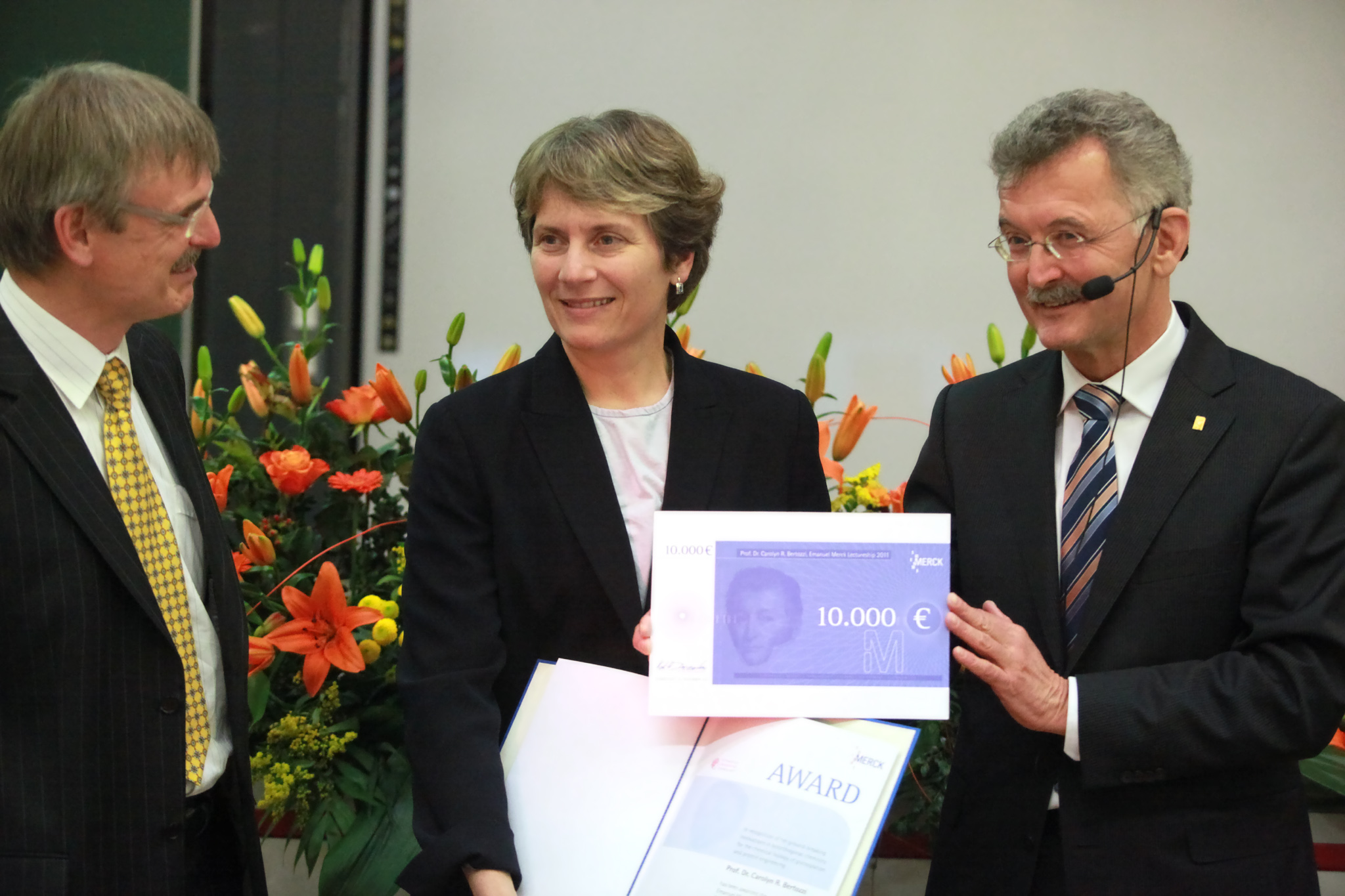
Carolyn Bertozzi, receiving the Emanuel Merck Lectureship in 2011

- 1987 – Phi Beta Kappa
- 1997 – Alfred P. Sloan Research Fellowship
- 1997 – Horace S. Isbell Award in Carbohydrate Chemistry
- 1998 – Glaxo Wellcome Scholars' Award
- 1998 – Beckman Young Investigators Award
- 1999 – Arthur C. Cope Scholar Award of the American Chemical Society
- 1999 – Camille Dreyfus Teacher-Scholar Award
- 1999 – MacArthur Fellowship
- 2000 – Presidential Early Career Award for Scientists and Engineers
- 2000 – Merck Academic Development Program Award
- 2001 – UC Berkeley Distinguished Teaching Award
- 2001 – ACS Award in Pure Chemistry
- 2001 – Donald Sterling Noyce Prize for Excellence in Undergraduate Teaching
- 2001 – Fellow of the American Association for the Advancement of Science
- 2002 – Irving Sigal Young Investigator Award of the Protein Society
- 2003 – Fellow of the American Academy of Arts and Sciences
- 2003 – Havinga Medal, Univ. Leiden
- 2004 – Agnes Fay Morgan Research Award of Iota Sigma Pi
- 2005 – Member of the National Academy of Sciences
- 2005 – T.Z. and Irmgard Chu Distinguished Professorship in Chemistry
- 2007 – Ernst Schering Prize
- 2007 – LGBTQ Scientist of the Year Award – from the National Organization of Gay and Lesbian Scientists and Technical Professionals
- 2008 – Li Ka Shing Women in Science Award
- 2008 – Roy L. Whistler International Award in Carbohydrate Chemistry
- 2008 – Member of the German Academy of Sciences Leopoldina
- 2008 – Willard Gibbs Award
- 2009 – William H. Nichols Medal
- 2009 – Harrison Howe Award
- 2009 – Albert Hofmann Medal, Univ. Zurich
- 2010 – Lemelson–MIT Prize
- 2010 – Royal Society of Chemistry – Organic Division, Bioorganic Chemistry Award
- 2011 – Member of the Institute of Medicine
- 2011 – Tetrahedron Young Investigator Award for Bioorganic and Medicinal Chemistry
- 2011 – Emanuel Merck Lectureship
- 2012 – Honorary Doctorate of Science from Brown University
- 2012 – Heinrich Wieland Prize
- 2013 – Elected Fellow of the National Academy of Inventors
- 2013 – Hans Bloemendal Award
- 2015 – UCSF 150th Anniversary Alumni Excellence Awards
- 2017 – Arthur C. Cope Award
- 2017 – Inducted into the National Inventors Hall of Fame
- 2018 – Foreign Member of the Royal Society (ForMemRS)
- 2020 – John J. Carty Award for the Advancement of Science
- 2020 – Chemistry for the Future Solvay Prize
- 2020 – F. A. Cotton Medal for Excellence in Chemical Research
- 2022 – Wolf Prize in Chemistry
- 2022 – Dr H. P. Heineken Prize for Biochemistry and Biophysics
- 2022 – Dickson Prize in Medicine
- 2022 – Welch Award in Chemistry
- 2022 – Bijvoet Medal of the Bijvoet Centre for Biomolecular Research of Utrecht University
- 2022 – Lifetime Mentor Award, American Association for the Advancement of Science.
- 2022 – Nobel Prize in Chemistry
- 2023 – Roger Adams Award
- 2023 – AACR Award for Outstanding Achievement in Chemistry in Cancer Research
- 2024 – Priestley Medal, American Chemical Society
- 2026 – Honorary Doctorate of Sciences from the University of Pennsylvania.
- 2026 – Awarded Honorary Fellow of the Royal Society of Chemistry.

== Personal life ==
Bertozzi grew up in Lexington, Massachusetts, the daughter of the late Norma Gloria (Berringer) and William Bertozzi. Her father was of Italian descent. Her maternal grandparents were from Nova Scotia, Canada. She has two sisters, one of whom, Andrea Bertozzi, is on the mathematics faculty at the University of California, Los Angeles. Her father was a physics professor at the Massachusetts Institute of Technology.

She briefly considered a music major after her keyboard skills earned her places in several college rock bands, but felt she was "always centered on the sciences." She continued to make room for music, eventually learning bass guitar.

Bertozzi is a lesbian and has been out since the late 1980s. She and her wife have three sons. As an open lesbian in academia and science, she has served as a role model for students and colleagues.
