= Jennifer Prescher =

American chemist and academic

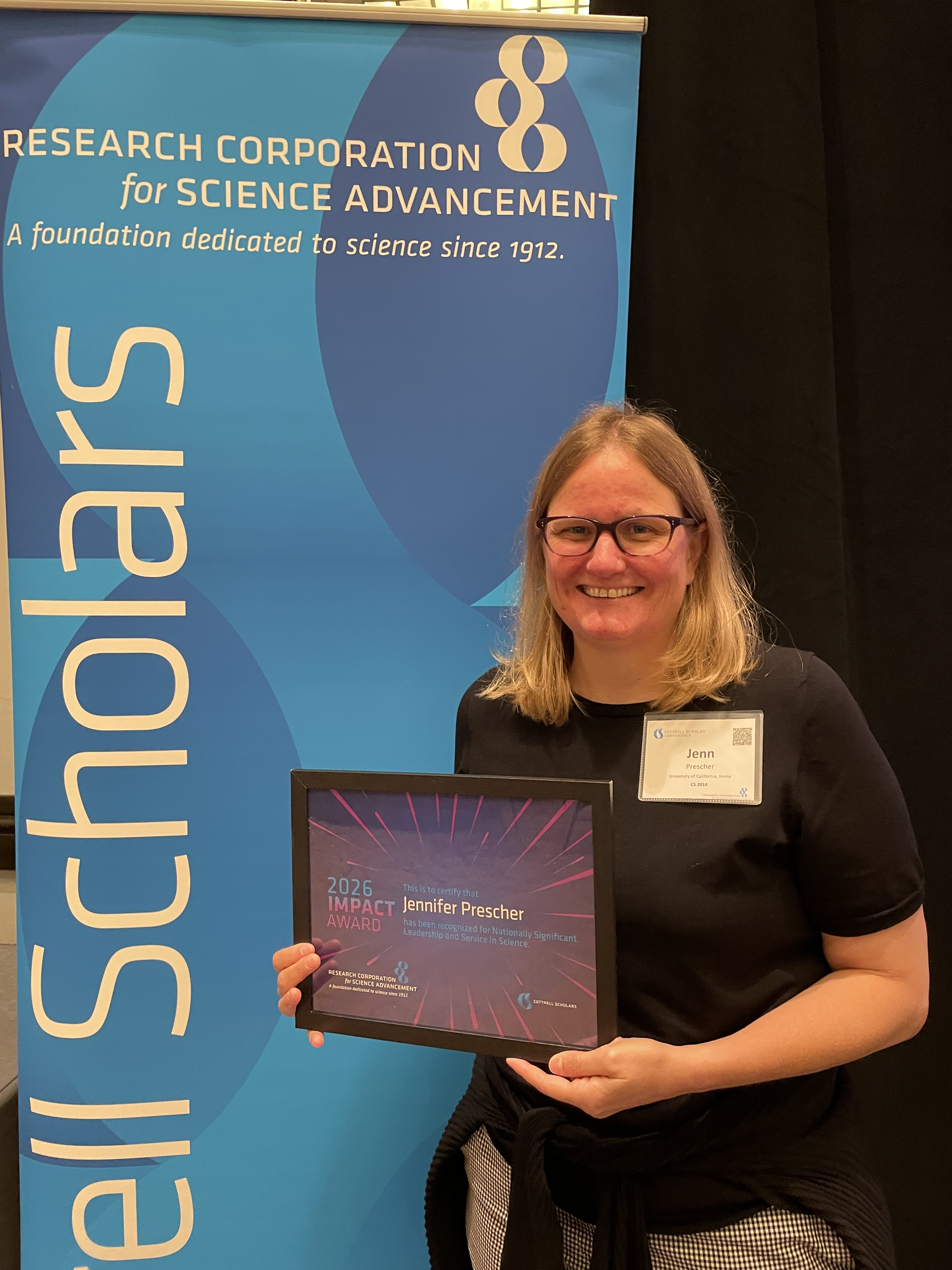
- Jenn Prescher holding her IMPACT Award at the 2026 Cottrell Scholars Conference
- Born: Jennifer Ann Prescher
- Education: University of Wisconsin–La Crosse (BS); University of California, Berkeley (PhD)
- Awards: National Science Foundation CAREER Award (2014); Sloan Research Fellowship (2015)
- Scientific career
- Fields: Chemistry
- Workplaces: Stanford University; University of California, Irvine
- Thesis: Probing glycosylation in living animals with bioorthogonal chemistries (2006)
- Doctoral advisor: Carolyn Bertozzi
- Website: www.chem.uci.edu/people/jennifer-prescher

Jennifer Ann Prescher is an American chemist who is a professor of chemistry at the University of California, Irvine. In her research, she considers the development of bioorthogonal, bioluminescent tools for the noninvasive, real-time imaging of immunometabolism. She has been recognized with the 2023 American Chemical Society Arthur C. Cope Scholar Award.

== Early life and education ==
Prescher earned her undergraduate degree in chemistry at the University of Wisconsin–La Crosse. She earned her Ph.D. at the University of California, Berkeley as a Howard Hughes Medical Institute predoctoral fellow, where she worked with Carolyn Bertozzi on glycosylation. She developed a strategy to visualize the glycosylation process, which allowed for the design and development of novel diagnostics. The strategy relied upon the use of bioorthogonal chemistries. Specifically, she showed that it was possible to incorporate metabolic precursor sugars with specific chemical functionalities into target glycans. For example, biologically inert azides can be incorporated into glycans and chemically modified with exogenously delivered probes.

== Research and career ==
In 2008, she joined Stanford University as a Susan Komen postdoctoral fellow. Prescher joined the faculty of the University of California, Irvine in 2010, and was promoted to full professor in 2018. In her early research, she designed imaging techniques to better understand cell movements and metastatic disease. She worked on bioluminescent tools; tools which luminesce when they come into close proximity to cancer cells. She called the technique a biological flashlight, or phasor.

== Awards and honors ==
- 2014 Kavli Fellow
- 2014 National Science Foundation CAREER Award
- 2014 Research Corporation Cottrell Scholar
- 2015 Sloan Research Fellowship
- 2015 Novartis early career award in organic chemistry
- 2016 Thieme Medical Publishers chemistry journal award
- 2016 American Chemical Society Women in Chemistry Rising Star
- 2016 University of California, Irvine distinguished assistant professor award for research
- 2018 Scialog Fellow
- 2021 Paul Allen Distinguished Investigator
- 2023 American Chemical Society Arthur C. Cope Scholar Award
- 2026 Research Corporation Cottrell Scholars IMPACT Award

== Selected publications ==
- A Comparative Study of Bioorthogonal Reactions with Azides
- A strain-promoted [3 + 2] azide-alkyne cycloaddition for covalent modification of biomolecules in living systems
- Chemistry in living systems
