= Allan Adams =

American physicist and oceanographer

- Born: Bogotá, Colombia
- Education: Harvard College; UC Berkeley; Stanford University
- Scientific career
- Fields: Theoretical physics, ocean engineering, oceanography
- Institutions: Harvard University; Massachusetts Institute of Technology; Woods Hole Oceanographic Institution
- Doctoral advisor: Eva Silverstein

Allan Adams is a Colombian-born American physicist, oceanographer, and entrepreneur. His research in physics has focused on string theory, QFT, and fluid dynamics, while his work in oceanography and ocean engineering have focused on high-precision optical, electro-chemical, and genomic sensing. Adams is the founder and CEO of Aquatic Labs.

Adams earned degrees in physics from Harvard College, UC Berkeley, and Stanford University before joining the faculty of the MIT Department of Physics in 2008. Adams opened the Future Ocean Lab at the Massachusetts Institute of Technology in 2017, and became a Visiting Oceanographer at the Woods Hole Oceanographic Institution in 2018. In 2022, Adams left MIT to found Aquatic Labs, a water-technology startup in Cambridge, MA.

Adams is an avid sailplane pilot, cave diver, and father of two boys.

== Awards and recognition ==
Adams was a Junior Fellow in the Harvard Society of Fellows before joining the faculty at MIT. Adams has received numerous awards for his teaching and monitorship, including MIT's School of Science Teaching Prize, the Buechner Teaching and Advising Prizes, and the Baker Memorial Award. His introductory lectures on Quantum Mechanics are freely available via MIT OpenCourseWare and have been viewed more than 10 million times. His talks on gravitational waves at TED 2016 and TED 2014 have been viewed more than 4.7 million times.

== Selected publications ==
- Don't Panic! Closed String Tachyons in ALE Spacetimes.
- String universality in ten dimensions.
- $\mathcal{N}={1}$ Sigma Models in $\ce{AdS_4}$.
- Disordered Holographic Systems I & II.
- GLSMs for non-Kähler Geometries.
- Holographic Vortex Liquids and Superfluid Turbulence.
- Holographic Turbulence.
