= ACS Central Science =

Monthly open access journal

- Discipline: Multidisciplinary
- Language: English
- Edited by: Carolyn R. Bertozzi

Publication details
- History: 2015–present
- Publisher: ACS Publications
- Frequency: Monthly
- Open access: yes
- Impact factor: 12.7 (2023)

Standard abbreviations
- ISO 4: ACS Cent. Sci.

Indexing
- ISSN: 2374-7943 (print); 2374-7951 (web)
- OCLC no.: 890595211

Links
- Journal homepage; Online access; Online archive

ACS Central Science is a monthly peer-reviewed open access scientific journal covering chemistry and related fields. Its title refers to the phrase "central science", which has long been used to describe the role played by chemistry in connecting the physical and life sciences.

Established in 2015, it is the first fully open-access journal (diamond open access) published by ACS Publications, the American Chemical Society's publishing arm. The editor-in-chief is Carolyn R. Bertozzi (Stanford University).

According to the Journal Citation Reports, the journal has a 2023 impact factor of 12.7.
