= Naomi Pierce =

American biologist

Naomi E. Pierce
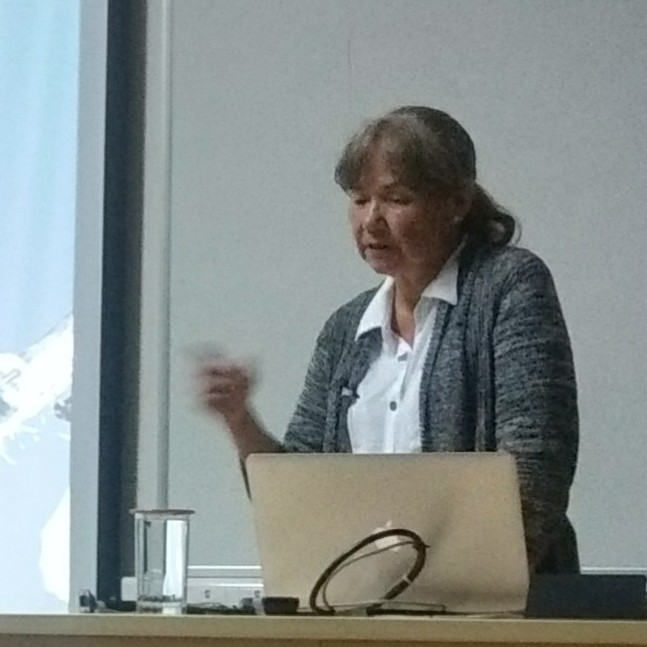
- Pierce speaking in India in 2018
- Born: 1954 (age 71–72)
- Education: Yale University, Harvard University
- Known for: Research on butterfly evolution, plant–herbivore coevolution, and ant–butterfly interactions
- Spouse: Andrew Berry
- Awards: MacArthur Fellowship (1988); International Prize for Biology (2019); National Academy of Sciences (elected 2023); Lifetime Achievement Award (2025)
- Scientific career
- Fields: Entomology, evolutionary biology
- Workplaces: Harvard University

Naomi E. Pierce (born 1954) is an American entomologist and evolutionary biologist who currently serves as the Sidney A. and John. H. Hessel Professor of Biology at Harvard University. She studies plant-herbivore coevolution and is a world authority on butterflies.

== Education ==
Pierce earned her B.S. in Biology at Yale in 1976. She earned her Ph.D. in Biology at Harvard in 1983. The same year, Pierce became a Fulbright Scholar in Zoology from Harvard University to Griffith University. Five years later, she was named a MacArthur Fellow in 1988 with Ecology and Evolutionary/Environmental Biology as area of focus.

== Career ==
Pierce is the Hessel Professor of Biology and Curator of Lepidoptera in the Department of Organismic and Evolutionary Biology at Harvard University.

From 1984 to 1986, Pierce served as a Research Lecturer at Christ Church, Oxford and a NATO Research Fellow at Oxford's Department of Zoology. In 1986, she moved to Princeton University as Assistant until 1989, when she served as an Associate Professor of Biology for one year. In 1991, Pierce was appointed Hessel Professor and Curator of Lepidoptera at Harvard University.

The Pierce Lab studies topics including the evolution of symbioses, phylogeny, biogeography, systematics, plant-insect-microbe interactions, and biodiversity and life history evolution of insects. Pierce is known for her research on the relationship between lycaenid butterfly larvae and ants, as well as the genetic trends within the species, in order to understand the process of evolution. Pierce and collaborators Corrie Moreau and Charles D. Bell were the first to establish the origin of ants at 140 to 168 million years ago using molecular sequence data, 40 million years older than previous estimates.

In 2011, Pierce contributed to research understanding butterfly evolution through molecular phylogenetic studies. The study provided evidence supporting a hypothesis proposed by novelist and lepidopterist Vladimir Nabokov regarding the evolutionary relationships of certain butterfly lineages in America. Specifically the New World blue butterflies, suggesting that their ancestors colonized America from Asia through a series of migration and diverse evolutionary processes through multiple lineages.

In 2018, the entomopathogenic fungus Ophiocordyceps naomipierceae was named in Pierce's honor.

== Personal life ==
She is married to evolutionary biologist and historian of science Andrew Berry (biologist), and they have twin children.

== Selected awards ==
- Lifetime Achievement Award, 2025
- Elected to the National Academy of Sciences, 2023
- International Prize for Biology, 2019
- American Academy of Arts and Sciences Fellow, 2018
- Entomological Society of America Fellow, 2011
- American Association for the Advancement of Science Fellow, 2007
- Senior Fellow of the Society of Fellows, Harvard University
- MacArthur Fellow, 1988
- Fulbright Scholar, 1983
