= Carbohydrate–insulin model =

Theory that obesity is caused by excessive carbohydrate consumption

The carbohydrate-insulin model (CIM) posits that obesity is caused by excess consumption of carbohydrate, which then disrupts normal insulin metabolism leading to weight gain and weight-related illnesses. It is contrasted with the mainstream energy balance model (EBM), which holds that obesity is caused by an excess in calorie consumption compared to calorie expenditure. According to the carbohydrate–insulin model, low-carbohydrate diets would be the most effective in causing long-term weight loss. Notable proponents of the carbohydrate–insulin model include Gary Taubes and David Ludwig. The CIM has been tested in mice and humans. Although some experts consider that these studies falsified the CIM, proponents disagree. Available evidence does not support the existence of a long-term advantage in weight loss for low-carbohydrate diets.

== See also ==
- Adipose tissue
- Appetite
- Basal metabolic rate
- Energy homeostasis
- Glucagon
- Glycemic index
- Glycemic load
- Hyperinsulinemia
- Insulin sensitivity
- Insulin
- Ketogenic diet
- Leptin
- Lipogenesis
- Low-carbohydrate diet
- Low-glycemic index diet
- Metabolic Syndrome
- Obesity
- Refined carbohydrates
- Set point theory
- Sugar
- Ultra-processed food
