= Sarah Derbew =

Classical scholar

Sarah Derbew is a classics scholar who focuses on race and skin color in Ancient Greece. She is currently assistant professor of Classics at Stanford University. Her research specialises in Ancient Greek literature and art. The Bryn Mawr Classical Review called her recent book Untangling Blackness in Antiquity "a radical recuperation of blackness in antiquity". She was awarded the 2023 PROSE award for Classics for the book. She is the co-founder of AFRICA SALON a literary festival that promotes African and African diaspora authors.

In an interview with The Guardian she describes the challenges of thinking about race in antiquity and the effects of our word choices: "Race is a complicated term to unpack in relation to the ancient world. It is irresponsible to use the same word that white intellectuals and slaveowners from western Europe manipulated without qualification." Her work also engages with how museums display and label objects in regards to race.

== Selected publications ==
=== Books ===
- Untangling Blackness in Greek Antiquity, 2022. Cambridge University Press.

=== Articles ===
- Derbew, Sarah (2025) "Kebra Nagast (ክብረ ነገሥት, "The Glory of the Kings," c. fourteenth century CE)." In Classics and Race: A Historical Reader, edited by Sarah Derbew, Daniel Orrells, and Phiroze Vasunia. UCL Press.
- Derbew, Sarah (2024) "Doublespeak in Ancient Greek and Modern Ethiopian Satire," TAPA 154 (1): 185-211.
- Derbew, Sarah (2023) "Representations of Black People in Mediterranean Antiquity." In Africa and Byzantium, edited by Andrea Myers Achi, 112-13. New York: Metropolitan Museum of Art.
- Derbew, Sarah (2021) "Definitions and Representations of Race in Ancient Greek Literature" in A Cultural History of Race in Antiquity: Volume 1, edited by Denise McCoskey, 21-31. London: Bloomsbury.
- Derbew, Sarah (2021) "Race in Aeschylus' Persians and Suppliant Women" in Companion to Aeschylus, edited by Jacques Bromberg and Peter Burian. West Sussex: Wiley-Blackwell. (BMCR review here)
- Derbew, Sarah (2019) "(Re)membering Sara Baartman, Venus, and Aphrodite," Classical Receptions Journal 11 (3): 336-354.
