= Mireille Kamariza =

Burundian-born American bioscientist

- Born: Bujumbura, Burundi
- Education: San Diego Mesa College; University of California, San Diego (BS); University of California, Berkeley (MA); Stanford University (PhD)
- Known for: chemical tools, biosensors, point-of-care diagnostics
- Scientific career
- Thesis: The Power of Solvatochromism: Using Environment-sensitive Trehalose Probes to Detect Mycobacteria with Applications in Research and Medicine (2019)
- Doctoral advisor: Carolyn R. Bertozzi

Mireille Kamariza is a Burundian-born American bioscientist and an Assistant Professor in the Bioengineering Department at the UCLA Henry Samueli School of Engineering and Applied Science. Previously, Kamariza was appointed as a Harvard Junior Fellow for her postdoctoral studies and she completed her doctoral studies in Biology at Stanford University. Her research considers the development of chemical biosensing tools, low cost point-of-care diagnostics, infectious diseases, and global health. In 2020, she was named as one of Chemical & Engineering News's Talented 12.

== Early life ==
Kamariza was born in Burundi a few years before the Burundi Civil War. Kamariza became interested in science as a child, and enjoyed reading books about planets. Girls rarely attend college in Burundi, but Kamariza enrolled at a government-managed Catholic school.

During Kamariza's childhood, she often had to move due to the ongoing civil war. Kamariza observed the ravages that infectious diseases such as AIDS and malaria have on already vulnerable populations. But whilst malaria and AIDS receive significant media attention and funding, they are not the most lethal conditions in Africa. In 2015, tuberculosis killed 1.4 million people, considerably more than AIDS, and there is still significant stigma surrounding the disease.

In 2006, Kamariza and her brothers moved to San Diego, California. Together they lived close to San Diego Mesa College, where Kamariza took classes alongside working to support herself. Saloua Saidane, one of her professors, noticed her talent and suggested that she focused on her education. Following Saidane's advice, Kamariza quit her job at Safeway.

Kamariza transferred and completed her bachelor's degree in biochemistry at the University of California, San Diego. At UCSD, Kamariza and her colleagues established a peer-to-peer mentoring program that paired transfer students with current UCSD students. Her efforts inspired other initiatives at UCSD, including supporting transfer students in identifying research opportunities. Her impact on UCSD was recognised by her undergraduate dean David Artis, who referred to Kamariza as one of his "all-time favorite students". She was awarded an American Chemical Society (ACS) internship to work at the ACS headquarters.

== Education and research ==
In 2012 Kamariza moved to the University of California, Berkeley, for her graduate studies in cell biology. She applied to join the research group of Carolyn R. Bertozzi. After earning her master's degree, Kamariza joined Stanford University as a graduate student, still working in the Bertozzi laboratory. Here she developed a new point of care diagnostic device for tuberculosis (TB). Tuberculosis is caused by the mycobacterium tuberculosis, a bacterium that has a cell wall so dense that it is difficult for drugs to penetrate. Trehalose is a chemical compound that is found in a range of living organisms that is used by mycobacterium tuberculosis as a scaffold. Kamariza developed DMN-Tre (4-N,N-dimethy-laminonaph-thal-i-mide-trehalose), a molecule that lights up when it is incorporated into the cell walls of mycobacteria. Her research was commercialised, and together with Bertozzi she founded OliLux Biosciences, a company that looks to develop low cost diagnostics for low-income countries. It was awarded a Bill & Melinda Gates Foundation grant to test their diagnostic devices in places with high levels of disease. She has tested it with small groups of patients in South Africa. In 2017 Kamariza was selected as one of Fortune magazine's World's Most Powerful Women.

Kamariza was appointed a Harvard Junior Fellow at Harvard University in 2019. She examines topics regarding precision medicine in global health. She was named one of Chemical & Engineering News's Talented 12 in 2020.

== Select publications ==
- Mireille Kamariza; Peyton Shieh; Christopher S Ealand; et al. (1 February 2018). "Rapid detection of Mycobacterium tuberculosis in sputum with a solvatochromic trehalose probe". Science Translational Medicine. 10 (430). doi:10.1126/SCITRANSLMED.AAM6310. ISSN 1946-6234. PMC 5985656. PMID 29491187.
- Mireille Kamariza; Peyton Shieh; Carolyn R Bertozzi (21 November 2017). "Imaging Mycobacterial Trehalose Glycolipids". Methods in Enzymology. 598: 355–369. doi:10.1016/BS.MIE.2017.09.002. ISSN 0076-6879. PMC 6038140. PMID 29306442.
- William E. Allen; James Alexander Briggs; Xin Jin; et al. (26 August 2020). "Population-scale longitudinal mapping of COVID-19 symptoms, behaviour and testing". Nature Human Behaviour. doi:10.1038/S41562-020-00944-2. hdl:1721.1/128952. ISSN 2397-3374. PMC 7501153. PMID 32848231.
