= David Ludwig (physician) =

American physician

David Samuel Ludwig
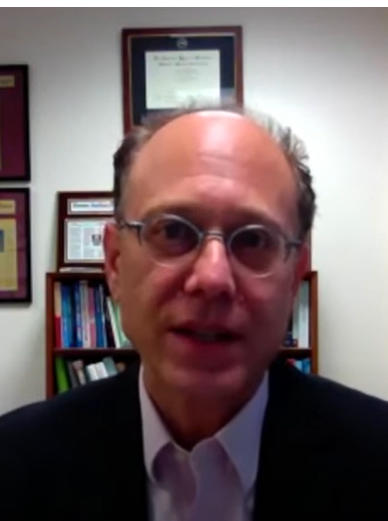
- Born: December 24, 1957 (age 68)
- Education: Stanford University
- Known for: Obesity-related research, particularly with regard to soft drinks and milk
- Awards: E.V. McCollum Award and Oded Bar-Or Award
- Scientific career
- Fields: Endocrinology
- Workplaces: Boston Children's Hospital
- Thesis: Chemical, immunochemical and crystallographic studies of cholera toxin and its receptor binding domain (1986)
- Website: www.drdavidludwig.com

David S. Ludwig (born December 24, 1957) is an American endocrinologist and low-carbohydrate diet advocate in Boston, Massachusetts. He is a promoter of functional medicine.

== Education ==
Ludwig received a PhD and an MD from Stanford University School of Medicine. He completed an internship and residency in pediatrics and a fellowship in pediatric endocrinology at Boston Children's Hospital.

== Career ==
Ludwig is a professor of pediatrics at the Harvard Medical School and a professor of nutrition at the Harvard School of Public Health. Ludwig is co-director of the New Balance Foundation Obesity Prevention Center Boston Children's Hospital. He has published several studies about the causes of obesity in children and adults, and attracted attention for his recommendation that severely obese children be removed from the custody of their parents. He is a paid associate editor of the American Journal of Clinical Nutrition and a US editor of The BMJ. Ludwig is a presenter for the Institute of Functional Medicine, an organization that promotes functional medicine.

=== Low-carbohydrate advocacy ===
Ludwig is the author of the low-carbohydrate diet book Always Hungry?, Always Delicious, Retrain Your Fat Cells, and Lose Weight Permanently, published in 2016. He has argued that low-fat high-carbohydrate diets are the underlying cause of obesity. Ludwig's book Always Hungry? has been criticized for relying heavily on a pilot study that tested his low-carbohydrate diet that ran for only 16 weeks. Ludwig has since commented that the pilot study "was never intended as proof", however, his book cited weight loss "success stories" from the pilot participants to make very specific claims about his diet and weight loss.

Ludwig was a speaker at Low Carb Denver in 2019. He has received royalties for his low-carbohydrate diet books. He is a proponent of the carbohydrate–insulin model of obesity, a model which is not supported by good medical evidence.

== Selected publications ==
- Always Hungry?: Conquer Cravings, Retrain Your Fat Cells, and Lose Weight Permanently (2016)
- Always Delicious: Over 175 Satisfying Recipes to Conquer Cravings, Retrain Your Fat Cells, and Keep the Weight Off Permanently (2018)
- Ludwig, David S; Aronne, Louis J; Astrup, Arne; de Cabo, Rafael; Cantley, Lewis C; Friedman, Mark I; Heymsfield, Steven B; Johnson, James D; King, Janet C; Krauss, Ronald M; Lieberman, Daniel E; Taubes, Gary; Volek, Jeff S; Westman, Eric C; Willett, Walter C; Yancy, William S; Ebbeling, Cara B (2021). "The carbohydrate-insulin model: a physiological perspective on the obesity pandemic". The American Journal of Clinical Nutrition. 114 (6): 1873–1885. doi:10.1093/ajcn/nqab270. PMC 8634575. PMID 34515299.

== See also ==
- Gary Taubes
- Hereditary factors in childhood obesity
