= Deborah M. Gordon =

American biologist

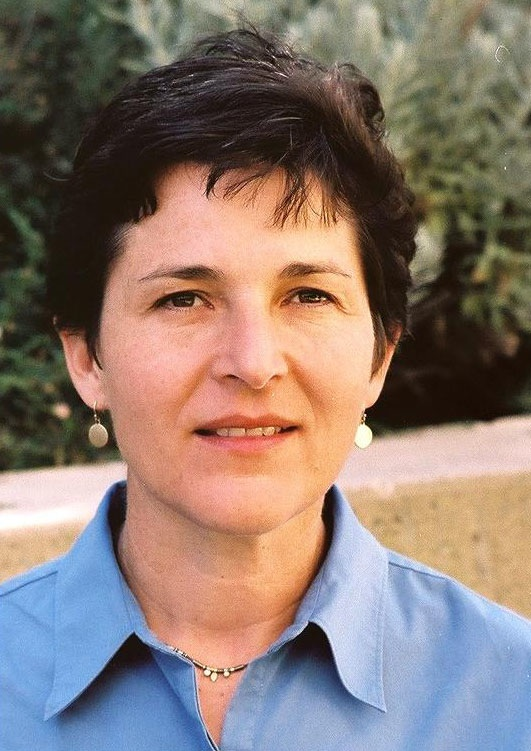
- Born: December 30, 1955 (age 70)
- Education: Oberlin College; Stanford University; Duke University
- Known for: Red harvester ant colony behavior
- Awards: Junior Fellow, Harvard Society of Fellows (1984); Fellow, Center for Advanced Study in the Behavioral Sciences (1997, 2001); Guggenheim Fellowship (2001); Fellow, California Academy of Sciences (2007); Fellow, Animal Behavior Society (2017)
- Scientific career
- Fields: Biology; Myrmecology
- Workplaces: Harvard University; University of Oxford; Imperial College London; Stanford University

Deborah M. Gordon (born December 30, 1955) is an American biologist best known for her impactful research in the behavioral ecology of ants and her studies on the operations of ant colonies without a central control. In addition to overseeing The Gordon Lab, she is currently a Professor of Biology at Stanford University.

== Education and employment ==
In 1976, Deborah M. Gordon received a B.A. in French from Oberlin College, graduating with high honors. She went on to get her master's in Biology from Stanford University in 1977 and Ph.D. in Zoology from Duke University in 1983.

At 29, Gordon was selected as a Junior Fellow by the Harvard Society of Fellows (1984). She then worked in the Centre for Mathematical Biology at Oxford in 1987. She was a Research Associate for the Centre for Population Biology at Imperial College London at Silwood Park and was a College Research Fellow at Lady Margaret Hall University of Oxford from 1989 to 1991.

In 1991, Gordon accepted an assistant professor of biology position at Stanford University. She became an associate professor in 1997 and a professor in 2003, which remains her current profession.

== Major research ==
Deborah Gordon and her team at The Gordon Lab study the behavior and ecology of ant colonies, specifically red harvester ants. She has extensively researched collective behavior, how colonies operate without central control, and comparisons between the workings of nature and other systems, such as the brain.

One of the main areas of Gordon's research is the evolution of collective behavior regarding ant colonies and the field of biology as a whole. In her talk "Local Interactions Determine Collective Behavior," hosted by iBiology, Gordon explains how collective behavior is the product of local interactions rather than governed by central control. She uses ant colonies to demonstrate this concept because individual ants make decisions based on their interactions with others, which then mediates the entire colony's activities. She coined the term " task allocation" to define how the red harvester ants adjust the task they focus on based on local interactions, such as brief antennal contacts, which are affected by the changing needs of the colony. In her article "The Ecology of Collective Behavior," Gordon tested the effects of three different environmental constraints on the evolution of collective behavior. These included the availability of resources, the operating costs associated with collective behavior, and the threat of network rupture. In her conclusion, she wrote how these constraints shape the activities in the colony and that an individual's decisions depend on the collective's decisions.

A second area of study for Gordon and her lab is on distributed organization in ant colonies and how that pertains to networks, colony identity, division of labor, and the effects of interactions on collective behavior. In the article "Local Regulation of Trail Networks of the Arboreal Turtle Ant, Cephalotes goniodontus," Gordon aims to investigate how the Arboreal Turtle Ant maintains and repairs its network of foraging trails. She found that trail pheromones maintain the colony's coherence as they move across junctions to prevent getting lost. In addition to supporting the coherence of the colony, recognizing nest mates versus non-nestmates is equally essential. "Distributed nestmate recognition in ants" discusses how, as with most things ant-related, the identity of the colony is established by the entire colony rather than individuals. Specific chemical profiles are associated with non-nestmates, and previous interactions with those ants determine how the colony will respond to the foreigners. This response is likely to change based on future interactions.

As Gordon has previously proved, ants decide based on the colony's needs rather than the individual. This concept remains steadfast in her paper "From division of labor to the collective behavior of social insects," which clarifies ants' process when deciding which task to dedicate their energy to. Gordon explained how ants don't divide labor in a way that humans would, where one individual specializes in a specific job, but instead, individual ants perform tasks based on the current needs of the colony. Initially, scientists theorized that ants performed tasks based on body size, but ants perform multiple jobs throughout their lifetime, disproving this theory. Ants do not carry out jobs that fit their strengths but instead, choose tasks depending on shifting interactions between others in the collective.

A third area of focus for Gordon's research is on the genetics of ants and how this affects their behavior and decision-making. In the article "Ant Genetics: Reproductive Physiology, Worker Morphology, and Behavior," Gordon and a colleague explain how there are "transcriptomic and epigenetic differences" between reproductive and sterile ants and between workers of varying body sizes. Their study shows a genetic component of task performance and reproductive status in some ant species.

A fourth area of Gordon's research is on ant-plant mutualisms. In the article "Plant defense, herbivory, and the growth of Cordia alliodora trees and their symbiotic Azteca ant colonies," Gordon investigated the mutualistic relationship between two populations of Amazonian myrmecophytes, Cordia nodosa and Duroia hirsuta and their symbiotic ants. The experiment results showed positive feedback between ant colony and plant growth rates, with the largest plants growing the most. They also found evidence of the same geometric growth in the ant colonies to match the plant growth. Further supporting these findings, when the plants lost the ants, their growth declined so much that they almost completely lost their domatia, a cavity produced by plants to house arthropods. The strong mutualistic relationship between the Amazonian myrmecophytes and ants allowed some groups in the study to grow very large and live significantly longer.

The final research topic for Gordon and her team is the spread of the invasive Argentine ant. 1996, Gordon published her most cited article, "Exploitation and interference competition between the invasive Argentine ant, Linepithema humile, and native ant species." The study describes how Argentine ants were consistently better than native ants at gathering food due to a more extended foraging period. The invasive ants also interfered with the foraging of native ant species and their attempts at establishing new colonies. Consequently, many native species have disappeared from the invaded areas, showing the detrimental effects of invasive species.

Gordon expanded on this research in her article "Community disassembly by an invasive species." This article's purpose was to convey that the effects of an invasive species go beyond just losing native species numbers. Using seven years of data in a biological preserve in northern California, Gordon and a team of researchers documented the aftermath of the invasive Argentine ant, including loss of biodiversity and changes in community organization of the species that did survive. Within a year of the appearance of the Argentine ant, native species had shifted from segregated to aggregated species in attempts to survive.

Recently, Deborah Gordon has continued her research on collective behavior as seen in articles including: "Measuring collective behavior: an ecological approach," "Collective behavior in relation to changing environments: Dynamics, modularity, and agency" and "Biological rhythms and task allocation in ant colonies." Her work influences several fields of biology and has provided valuable insights into self-organization, complex systems, and decentralized decision-making. Gordon's research on ants teaches us about the adaptive nature of colonies and is helpful to better understanding and improving human systems and organizations.

== Awards and recognition ==
In 1993, Gordon was named a Stanford MacNamara Fellow[1]. In 1995, she received an award for teaching excellence from the Phi Beta Kappa Northern California Association. In 2001, Gordon was awarded a Guggenheim fellowship from the John Simon Guggenheim Memorial Foundation. The same year, she was named a Fellow of the Center for Advanced Study in the Behavioral Sciences at Stanford. Gordon has spoken at TED twice, once in 2008 and the second in 2014. Between 2007 and 2016, she was named a Fellow of the California Academy of Sciences, the Center for Advanced Study in the Behavioral Sciences, and the Animal Behavior Society. She is also an adviser to the Microbes Mind Forum.

== Bibliography ==
- Gordon, Deborah M. (2000). Ants at Work: How An Insect Society Is Organized. W. W. Norton & Company. ISBN 0-393-32132-0. OCLC 41531917.
- Gordon, Deborah M. (2010). Ant Encounters: Interaction Networks and Colony Behavior. Princeton University Press. ISBN 978-0-691-13879-4. OCLC 433548903.
- Gordon, D. M. (2011). The fusion of behavioral ecology and ecology. Behavioral Ecology, 22(2), 225–230. https://doi.org/10.1093/beheco/arq172
- Gordon, Deborah M. (2012). The dynamics of foraging trails in the tropical arboreal Ant Cephalotes goniodontus. PLoS ONE, 7(11). https://doi.org/10.1371/journal.pone.0050472
- Prabhakar, B., Dektar, K. N., & Gordon, D. M. (2012). The regulation of ant colony foraging activity without spatial information. PLoS Computational Biology, 8(8). https://doi.org/10.1371/journal.pcbi.1002670
- Sturgis, S. J., & Gordon, D. M. (2012). Aggression is task dependent in the red harvester ant (Pogonomyrmex barbatus). Behavioral Ecology, 24(2), 532–539. https://doi.org/10.1093/beheco/ars194
- Gordon, D. (2013). The rewards of restraint in the collective regulation of foraging by harvester ant colonies. Nature 498, 91–93 . https://doi.org/10.1038/nature12137
- Gordon, Deborah M. (2014). The ecology of collective behavior. PLoS Biology, 12(3). https://doi.org/10.1371/journal.pbio.1001805
- Esponda, F., & Gordon, D. M. (2015). Distributed Nestmate recognition in ants. Proceedings of the Royal Society B: Biological Sciences, 282(1806), 20142838. https://doi.org/10.1098/rspb.2014.2838
- Gordon, D.M. From division of labor to the collective behavior of social insects. Behav Ecol Sociobiol 70, 1101–1108 (2016). https://doi.org/10.1007/s00265-015-2045-3
- Gordon, Deborah M. (2016). The evolution of the algorithms for collective behavior. Cell Systems, 3(6), 514–520. https://doi.org/10.1016/j.cels.2016.10.013
- Davidson, J. D., Arauco-Aliaga, R. P., Crow, S., Gordon, D. M., & Goldman, M. S. (2016). Effect of interactions between harvester ants on forager decisions. Frontiers in Ecology and Evolution, 4. https://doi.org/10.3389/fevo.2016.00115
- Gordon, Deborah M. (2017). Local regulation of trail networks of the arboreal turtle ant, cephalotes goniodontus. The American Naturalist, 190(6). https://doi.org/10.1086/693418
- Davidson, J. D., & Gordon, D. M. (2017). Spatial organization and interactions of harvester ants during foraging activity. Journal of The Royal Society Interface, 14(135), 20170413. https://doi.org/10.1098/rsif.2017.0413
- Deborah Gordon • Ibiology. iBiology. (2018, July 3). https://www.ibiology.org/speakers/deborah-gordon/
- Deborah M. Gordon - Agenda Contributor. World Economic Forum. (n.d.). https://www.weforum.org/agenda/authors/deborah-gordon/
- Gordon, Deborah M. (2023). The Ecology of Collective Behaviour. Princeton University Press. ISBN 978-0-691-23215-7.
- Gordon, D. (n.d.). Deborah Gordon. TED. https://www.ted.com/speakers/deborah_gordon
