= Harvard Society of Fellows =

Group of scholars selected at the beginnings of their careers by Harvard University

The Society of Fellows is a group of scholars selected at the beginnings of their careers by Harvard University for their potential to advance academic wisdom, upon whom are bestowed distinctive opportunities to foster their individual and intellectual growth. Junior fellows are appointed by senior fellows based upon previous academic accomplishments and receive generous financial support for three years while they conduct independent research at Harvard University in any discipline, without being required to meet formal degree requirements or to be graded in any way. The only stipulation is that they maintain primary residence in Cambridge, Massachusetts, for the duration of their fellowship. Membership in the society is for life.

The society has contributed numerous scholars to the Harvard faculty and thus significantly influenced the tenor of discourse at the university. Among its best-known members are philosopher W. V. O. Quine, Jf '36; behaviorist B. F. Skinner, Jf '36; double Nobel laureate John Bardeen, Jf '38; economist Paul Samuelson, Jf '40; historian Arthur M. Schlesinger, Jr., Jf '43; presidential advisor McGeorge Bundy, Jf '48; historian and philosopher of science Thomas Kuhn, Jf '51; linguist and activist Noam Chomsky, Jf '55; biologist E. O. Wilson, Jf '56; cognitive scientist Marvin Minsky, Jf '57; former dean of Harvard's Faculty of Arts and Sciences, economist Henry Rosovsky, Jf '57; economist and whistleblower Daniel Ellsberg, Jf '59; philosopher Saul Kripke, Jf '66; ethnographer and photographer Bruce Jackson, Jf '67; Fields Medal-winning theoretical physicist Ed Witten, Jf '81; and writer, critic, and editor Leon Wieseltier, Jf '82.

== History ==
You have been selected as a member of this society for your personal prospect of serious achievement in your chosen field, and your promise of notable contribution to knowledge and thought. That promise you must redeem with your whole intellectual and moral force.

You will practice the virtues, and avoid the snares, of the scholar. You will be courteous to your elders who have explored to the point from which you may advance; and helpful to your juniors who will progress farther by reason of your labors. Your aim will be knowledge and wisdom, not the reflected glamour of fame. You will not accept credit that is due to another, or harbor jealousy of an explorer who is more fortunate.

You will seek not a near but a distant objective, and you will not be satisfied with what you may have done. All that you may achieve or discover you will regard as a fragment of a larger pattern of the truth which from the separate approaches every true scholar is striving to descry.

To these things, in joining the Society of Fellows, you dedicate yourself.

— The Society's "Declaration of Principles"

Beginning in 1925, Harvard scholars Henry Osborn Taylor, Alfred North Whitehead and Lawrence Joseph Henderson met several times to discuss their frustration with the conditions of graduate study at the university. They believed that in order to produce exceptional research, the most able men required freedom from financial worries, fewer formal requirements, and the liberty to choose whatever object of study attracted them.

They soon found an ally in then-Harvard-president Abbott Lawrence Lowell who appointed a committee in 1926, with Henderson as chairman, to study the nature of an institution that might improve the quality of graduate education. The committee recommended the establishment of a Society of Fellows at Harvard, modeled particularly on the Prize Fellowship at Trinity College, Cambridge, and partly on those at Fondation Thiers in Paris and All Souls' College, Oxford, with the hope that such a society would produce not only "isolated geniuses, but men who will do the work of the world".

After years of trying to attract outside donations, Lowell funded the Society himself – his last major institutional act before his resignation in November 1932. "There being no visible source of necessary funds," he later wrote, "I gave it myself, in a kind of desperation, although it took nearly all I had." Though it was an open secret that Lowell was the source of the anonymous donation, this was never acknowledged in his presence. After Lowell's death in 1943, the donation was officially made public; it is known as the Anna Parker Lowell Fund in memory of Lowell's wife.

The society was officially inaugurated as an alternative to the Ph.D. system with the beginning of the 1933–34 academic year, granting fellows freedom to pursue lines of inquiry that transcended traditional academic disciplinary boundaries. Because of the core belief in the importance of informal discussions between scholars in different academic fields, both senior and junior fellows have met for dinner every Monday night during term-time. They are frequently joined by visiting scholars and Fellows are encouraged to bring guests.

Originally headquartered in a two-room suite at Eliot House, one of the university's twelve residential colleges, the society was closed to women until 1972, when Martha Nussbaum was selected as the first female junior fellow.

== Current senior fellows ==
These are the Society's current senior fellows, who elect the incoming junior fellows:

Name	Department	Years served
Alan Garber, ex officio	Medicine, economics	2013 – present
John Manning, ex officio	Law	2024 – present
Hopi Hoekstra, ex officio	Evolutionary Biology	2023 – present
Noah Feldman (chair)	Law	2010 – present
Catherine Dulac	Biology	2022 – present
Peter Galison	History of Science	1996 – present
Tamar Gendler (acting)	Philosophy & Psychology	2026 – present
Jerry Green	Economics	2000 – present
Bertrand I. Halperin	Physics	2004 – present
Joseph Koerner	History of Art	2008 – present
Elaine Scarry	English	1994 – present
Naomi Pierce	Biology	1997 – present
Andrew Strominger	Physics	2000 - present
Eric Nelson (acting)	History, Political Theory	2025 – present
Maria Tatar	Germanic Languages & Literatures	2010 – present
William Todd	Slavic Languages & Literature	1992 – present
Xiaowei Zhuang	Biophysics	2023 – present

== See also ==
- List of Harvard junior fellows
- List of Black Harvard junior fellows
