= Unnecessary health care =

Health care provided with a higher volume or cost than is appropriate

Unnecessary health care (overutilization, overuse, or overtreatment) is health care provided with a higher volume or cost than is appropriate. In the United States, where health care costs are the highest as a percentage of GDP, overuse was the predominant factor in its expense, accounting for about a third of its health care spending ($750 billion out of $2.6 trillion) in 2012.

Factors that drive overuse include paying health professionals more to do more (fee-for-service), defensive medicine to protect against litigiousness, and insulation from price sensitivity in instances where the consumer is not the payer—the patient receives goods and services but insurance pays for them (whether public insurance, private, or both). Such factors leave many actors in the system (doctors, patients, pharmaceutical companies, device manufacturers) with inadequate incentive to restrain health care prices or overuse. This drives payers, such as national health insurance systems or the U.S. Centers for Medicare and Medicaid Services, to focus on medical necessity as a condition for payment. However, the threshold between necessity and lack thereof can often be subjective.

Overtreatment, in the strict sense, may refer to unnecessary medical interventions, including treatment of a self-limited condition (overdiagnosis) or to extensive treatment for a condition that requires only limited treatment. It is economically linked with overmedicalization.

Campaigns such as Choosing Wisely initiative have encouraged patients and physicians to discuss the necessity and potential risks of commonly overused tests and procedures.

== Definition ==
A forerunner of the term was what Jack Wennberg called unwarranted variation, different rates of treatments based upon where people lived, not clinical rationale. He had discovered that in studies that began in 1967 and were published in the 1970s and the 1980s: "The basic premise – that medicine was driven by science and by physicians capable of making clinical decisions based on well-established fact and theory – was simply incompatible with the data we saw. It was immediately apparent that suppliers were more important in driving demand than had been previously realized."

In 2008, US bioethicist Ezekiel J. Emanuel and health economist Victor R. Fuchs defined unnecessary health care as "overutilization", health care provided with a higher volume or cost than is appropriate. Recently, economists have sought to understand unnecessary health care in terms of misconsumption rather than overconsumption.

In 2009 two US physicians wrote in an editorial, that unnecessary care was "defined as services which show no demonstrable benefit to patients" and might represent 30% of U.S. medical care. They referred to a 2003 study on regional variations in Medicare spending, which found, "Medicare enrollees in higher-spending regions receive more care than those in lower-spending regions, but do not have better health outcomes or satisfaction with care."

In January 2012, the American College of Physicians Ethics, Professionalism, and Human Rights Committee suggested that overtreatment can also be understood in contrast to 'parsimonious care', defined as "care that utilizes the most efficient means to effectively diagnose a condition and treat a patient."

In April 2012, Berwick, from the Institute for Healthcare Improvement, and Andrew Hackbarth from the RAND Corporation defined overtreatment as "subjecting patients to care that, according to sound science and the patients' own preferences, cannot possibly help them—care rooted in outmoded habits, supply-driven behaviors, and ignoring science." They wrote that trying to do something (treatment or testing) for all patients who might need it inevitably entails doing that same thing for some patients who might not need it." In uncertain situations, "some non-beneficial care was the necessary byproduct of optimal clinical decision making."

In October 2015, two pediatricians said that considering "overtreatment as an ethical violation" could help see the conflicting incentives of health care workers for treatment or nontreatment.

Low-value health care, for the most part, is administration of tests or treatment, which though useful initially, offer little value if given repeatedly as a part of routine care.

== Cost ==
In the US, the country which spends the most on health care per person globally, patients have fewer doctor visits and fewer days in hospitals than people in other countries do, but prices are high, there is more use of some procedures and new drugs than elsewhere, and doctor salaries are double the levels in other countries. The New York Times reported "no one knows for sure" how much unnecessary care exists in the United States. Overuse of medical care is no longer a large fraction of total health care spending, which was $3.3 trillion in 2016.

Researchers in 2014 analyzed many services listed as low value by Choosing Wisely and other sources. They looked at spending in 2008–2009 and found that these services represented 0.6% or 2.7% of Medicare costs and there was no significant pattern of particular types of physicians ordering these low value services. The Institute of Medicine in 2010 gave two estimates of "unnecessary services," using different methodologies: 0.2% or 1% to 5% of health spending, which was US$2.6 trillion. The Institute of Medicine quoted that 2010 report in a 2012 report to support an estimate of 8% ($210 billion) in unnecessary services, without explaining the discrepancy. This IOM 2012 report also said there were $555 billion in other wasted spending, which have an "unknown overlap" with each other and the $210 billion. The United States National Academy of Sciences estimated in 2005, without giving its methods or sources, that "between $.30 and $.40 of every dollar spent on health care is spent on the costs of poor quality," amounting to "slightly more than a half-trillion dollars a year... wasted on overuse, underuse, misuse, duplication, system failures, unnecessary repetition, poor communication, and inefficiency. In 2003 Fisher et al. found that there was "no apparent regional health benefit for Medicare recipients from doing more, whether 'more' is expressed as hospitalizations, surgical procedures, or consultations within the hospital." Up to 30% of Medicare spending could be cut in 2003 without harming patients.

A study of low-value care in laboratory testing suggested that Medicare may have overspent at least US$1.95 billion on laboratory tests in the year 2019. The study found excessively frequent ordering of Hemoglobin A1c, prostate-specific antigen, vitamin D 25-hydroxy, and lipid panels.

When care is overused, patients are put at risk of complications unnecessarily, with documented harm to patients from overuse of surgeries and other treatments.

== Causes ==
Physicians' decisions are the proximate cause of unnecessary care, though the potential incentives and penalties they face can influence their choices.

=== Third-party payers and fee-for-service ===
When public or private insurance cover expenses and doctors are paid under a fee-for-service (FFS) model, neither has an incentive to consider the cost of treatment, a combination that contributes to waste. Fee-for-service is a large incentive for overuse because health care providers (such as doctors and hospitals) receive revenue from the overtreatment.

Atul Gawande investigated Medicare FFS reimbursements in McAllen, Texas, for a 2009 article in the New Yorker. In 2006, the town of McAllen was the second-most expensive Medicare market, behind Miami. Costs per beneficiary were almost twice the national average.

In 1992, however, McAllen had been almost exactly in line with the Medicare spending average. After looking at other potential explanations such as relatively poorer health or medical malpractice, Gawande concluded the town was a chief example of the overuse of medical services. Gawande concluded that a business culture (physicians viewing their practices as a revenue stream) had established itself there, in contrast to a culture of low-cost high-quality medicine at the Mayo Clinic and in the Grand Junction, Colorado, market. Gawande advised:

As America struggles to extend healthcare coverage while curbing health care costs, we face a decision that is more important than whether we have a public-insurance option, more important than whether we will have a single-payer system in the long run or a mixture of public and private insurance, as we do now. The decision is whether we are going to reward the leaders who are trying to build a new generation of Mayos and Grand Junctions. If we don't, McAllen won't be an outlier. It will be our future.

=== Medical malpractice laws and defensive medicine ===
To protect themselves from legal prosecution U.S. physicians have an incentive to order clinically unnecessary tests or tests of little potential value. While defensive medicine is a favored explanation for high medical costs by physicians, Gawande estimated in 2010 it only contributed to 2.4% of the total $2.3 trillion of U.S. health care spending in 2008.

=== Direct-to-consumer advertising ===
Direct-to-consumer advertising can encourage patients to ask for drugs, devices, diagnostics, or procedures. Sometimes service providers will simply give these treatments or services rather than attempting the potentially more unpleasant task of convincing the patient what they have requested is not needed, or is likely to cause more harm than good.

=== Physician predispositions ===
Dartmouth Medical School professor Gilbert Welch argued 2016 that certain predispositions by physicians and the general public may lead to unnecessary health care, including:

- Attempting to mitigate a risk without considering how small or unlikely the potential benefit is
- Attempting to fix an underlying problem, instead of using a less-risky monitoring or coping strategy
- Acting too quickly, when waiting for more information might be wiser
- Acting without considering the benefits of doing nothing
- Discounting downsides of diagnostic testing
- Preferring newer over older treatments without considering the cost of new treatments or the effectiveness of older ones
- Treating patients with terminal illness to maximize life span over quality of life, without probing a patient's preferences

== Examples ==
=== Imaging ===
Overuse of diagnostic imaging, such as X-rays and CT scans, is defined as any application unlikely to improve patient care. Factors that contribute to overuse include self-referral, patient wishes, inappropriate financially motivated factors, health system factors, industry, media, lack of awareness and defensive medicine. Respected organizations—such as the American College of Radiology (ACR), Royal College of Radiologists (RCR) and the World Health Organization (WHO)—have developed "appropriateness criteria". The Canadian Association of Radiologists estimated in 2009 that 30% of imaging was unnecessary in the Canadian health care system. 2008 Medicare claims showed overuse with chest CT's. Financial incentives have also been shown to have a significant impact on dental X-ray use with dentists who are paid a separate fee for each X-ray providing more X-rays.

Overuse of imaging can lead to a diagnosis of a condition that would have otherwise remained irrelevant (overdiagnosis).

==== Physician self-referral ====
One type of overuse can be physician self-referral. Multiple studies have replicated the finding that when non-radiologists have an ownership interest in the fees generated by radiology equipment—and can self-refer—their use of imaging is unnecessarily higher. The majority of U.S. growth in imaging use (the fastest-growing physician service) comes from self-referring nonradiologists. In 2004, this overuse was estimated to contribute to $16 billion of annual U.S. health care costs.

As of a 2018 review evidence of overtreatment, overmedicalization and overdiagnosis in pediatrics have been use of commercial rehydration solution, antidepressants, and parenteral nutrition; overmedicalization with planned early deliveries, immobilization of ankle injuries, use of hydrolyzed infant formula; and overdiagnosis of hypoxemia among children recovering from bronchiolitis.

=== Others ===
- Hospitalizations for those with chronic conditions who could be treated as outpatients
- Surgeries in Medicare patients in their last year of life; regions with high levels had higher death rates
- Antibiotic use for viral or self-limiting infections (an overmedication that can promote antibiotic resistance)
- Opiate prescriptions carry the risk of addiction. In some cases, the number of pills prescribed might exceed what is actually needed for pain relief from a given condition, or a different pain management technique or medication would be effective but less risky.
- Many blood transfusions in the U.S. are given without checking to see if they are needed after a previous transfusion, or are given in cases where monitoring, recovering the patient's own blood, or iron therapy would be effective and reduce the risk of complications
- An estimated one in eight coronary stents (used in $20,000 procedures) with nonacute indications (U.S.)
  - Stents performed by the formal chair of cardiology, Mark Midei, at St. Joseph Medical Center of Towson, Maryland
- Heart bypass surgeries at Redding Medical Center which resulted in an FBI raid
- Screening patients with advanced cancer for other cancers
- Annual cervical cancer screening in women with medical histories of normal pap smear and HPV test results

== Reduction efforts ==
Utilization management (utilization review) has evolved over decades among both public and private payers in an attempt to reduce overuse. In this effort, insurers employ physicians to review the actions of other physicians and detect overuse. Utilization review has a poor reputation among most clinicians as a corrupted system in which utilization reviewers have their own perverse incentives (i.e., find ways to deny coverage no matter what) and in some cases are not practicing physicians, lacking real-world clinical insight or wisdom. Results of a recent systematic review found that many studies focused more on reductions in utilization than in improving clinically meaningful measures.

The 2010 U.S. health care reform, the Patient Protection and Affordable Care Act, did not contain serious strategies to reduce overuse; "the public has made it clear that it does not want to be told what medical care it can and cannot have." Uwe Reinhardt, a health economist at Princeton, said "the minute you attack overutilization, you will be called a Nazi before the day is out".

Professional societies and other groups have begun to push for policy changes that would encourage clinicians to avoid providing unnecessary care. Most physicians accept that laboratory tests are overused, but "it remains difficult to persuade them to consider the possibility that they, too, might be overutilizing laboratory tests." In November 2011, the American Board of Internal Medicine Foundation began the Choosing Wisely campaign, which aims to raise awareness of overtreatment and change physician behavior by publicizing lists of tests and treatments that are often overused, and which doctors and patients should try to avoid.

The Clinical and Laboratory Standards Institute (CLSI) issued a 2017 guideline, "Developing and Managing a Medical Laboratory (Test) Utilization Program (GP49)", to help laboratories establish stewardship programs.

Clinical decision support tools can help decrease unnecessary laboratory testing. The PLUGS initiative (Patient-Centered Laboratory Utilization Guidance Services) aims to formalize laboratory stewardship practices. The TRUU-Lab (Test Renaming for Understanding and Utilization in the Laboratory) initiative is a cooperative effort of CDC, CMS, FDA, and CAP. The project aims to standardize the names of laboratory tests to limit errant test ordering. Genetic testing stewardship programs have been established to streamline molecular diagnostic ordering patterns.

The Joint Commission offers accreditation in patient blood management in conjunction with AABB. To become accredited, participating hospitals may distribute guidelines for appropriateness of blood transfusion, form a committee to audit blood utilization, identify areas for improvement, and monitor compliance.

In the UK, 2011, online platform AskMyGP was launched to decrease the amount of unnecessary medical appointments. In the app patients are given a questionnaire about their symptoms, which then assesses the patient's need for medical care. The program was a success, and as of January 2018 has managed over 29,000 patient episodes.

The Royal College of Pathologists issued 2021 guidelines for the minimum time that should elapse before a given laboratory test is repeated in a specific clinical scenario.

In April 2012, the Lown Institute and the New America Foundation Health Policy Program convened the 'Avoiding Avoidable Care' conference. It was the first major medical conference to focus entirely on overuse, and it included presentations from speakers including Bernard Lown, Don Berwick, Christine Cassel, Amitabh Chandra, JudyAnn Bigby, and Julio Frenk. A second meeting was planned for December 2013.

Since the meeting, the Lown Institute has focused its work on deepening the understanding of overuse and generating public discussion of the ethical and cultural drivers of overuse, especially on the role of the hidden curriculum in medical school and residency.

Patient safety committees, which are charged with reviewing the quality of care, can view overutilization as adverse event.

Campaigns such as Choosing Wisely initiative have encouraged patients and physicians to discuss the necessity and potential risks of commonly overused tests and procedures.

== See also ==
- Antibiotic misuse – Improper use of antibiotic medications
- Choosing Wisely – U.S.-based educational campaign
- Clinical decision support – Health information technology
- Diagnostic stewardship – Approach to optimizing diagnostic testing in patient care
- Medicare fraud – Claiming of Medicare health care reimbursement to which the claimant is not entitled
- Laboratory stewardship
- Moral hazard – Increases in the exposure to risk when insured, or when another bears the cost
- Overmedicalization – Categorization of human problems as medical
- Overdiagnosis – Diagnosis of disease that will never cause symptoms or death during a patient's lifetime
- Overdose – Use of an excessive amount of a drug
- Patient blood management – Set of medical practices
- Unnecessary surgery
