= Stewardship =

Planning and management of resources and processes

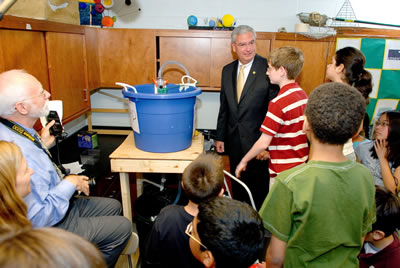
Former EPA Administrator Stephen Johnson teaches environmental stewardship to Roberto Clemente Middle School Students.

Stewardship is a practice committed to ethical value that embodies the responsible planning and management of resources. The concept of stewardship can be applied to the environment and nature, economics, health, places, property, information, theology, and cultural resources.

== Etymology ==
Stewardship was originally made up of the tasks of a domestic steward, from stiġ (house, hall) and weard, (ward, guard, guardian, keeper). In the beginning, it referred to the household servant's duties for bringing food and drink to the castle's dining hall. Stewardship responsibilities were eventually expanded to include the domestic, service and management needs of the entire household.

== Notable councils ==
- Forest Stewardship Council, since 1993
- Marine Stewardship Council, since 1996
- Aquaculture Stewardship Council, since 2010

== See also ==
- Antimicrobial stewardship
- Data steward
- Environmental ethics
- Environmental stewardship
- Nuclear stockpile stewardship
- Patient blood management
- Product stewardship
- Safer Detergents Stewardship Initiative
- Stewardship (theology)
- Stewardship theory
- Unnecessary health care
