= Choosing Wisely Canada =

Canadian health education campaign

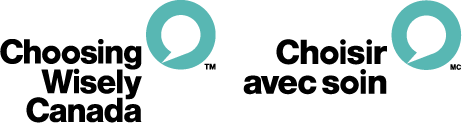
CWC logos EN FR

Choosing Wisely Canada (CWC) is a Canadian-based health education campaign launched on April 2, 2014 under the leadership of Wendy Levinson, in partnership with the Canadian Medical Association, and based at Unity Health Toronto and the University of Toronto. The campaign aims to help clinicians and patients engage in conversations about unnecessary tests, treatments and procedures, and to assist physicians and patients in making informed and effective choices to ensure high quality care.

The campaign is based on the notion that unnecessary tests, treatments, and procedures often do more harm than good, resulting in poor clinical outcomes and significant waste in the Canadian healthcare system. These unnecessary tests and procedures take away from care by potentially exposing patients to harm, leading to more testing to investigate false positive tests, and contributing to unnecessary anxiety and avoidable costs for patients. Choosing Wisely Canada aims to encourage and empower physicians to assimilate, evaluate, and implement the ever-increasing amount of evidence on current best practice. The campaign also supports the equally important role of patient education and the need to dispel the false notion that "more care is better care".

Central to the campaign are lists of "Things Clinicians and Patients Should Question" developed by more than eighty Canadian specialty societies. These lists are intended to encourage clinicians to adopt a "think twice" attitude to avoid unnecessary and potentially harmful tests and procedures, and to foster discussions between patients and clinicians about inappropriate care. The campaign also uses patient-friendly education materials to complement these lists, as well as teaches medical trainees about resource stewardship. As of November 1, 2025, 600 clinician recommendation have been released.

Choosing Wisely Canada leads an international community, made up of nations who are implementing similar programs in their respective countries. At present, this community includes representation from Australia, Austria, Brazil, Denmark, France, Germany, India, Israel, Italy, Japan, Netherlands, New Zealand, South Korea, Switzerland, United Kingdom, and United States.

== Motivation ==
External videos
- Dr. Wendy Levinson at launch of Choosing Wisely Canada

Choosing Wisely Canada stems from worldwide concern around providing unnecessary treatment when the risk of harm exceeds its potential benefit ("medical overuse"). A number of studies have highlighted the prevalence of medical overuse in Canada, which include findings that approximately 50% of prescriptions for respiratory infections in Saskatchewan are inappropriate, 28% of lumbar spine MRIs in Alberta and Ontario are unnecessary, and 28% of bone mineral density scans are inappropriate. These unnecessary invasive procedures and low-value care are major causes of preventable harm and increased waste of medical resources. Medical overuse has been associated with decreased patient satisfaction and poor clinical outcomes, including higher mortality. A systematic survey of patients in seven countries revealed that 10–20% of patients believed that their physicians had provided treatment of little or no value in the past two years. Further studies highlighted the financial strain of medical overuse, such as the analysis conducted by the Institute of Medicine, which found that up to 30% of American health care spending is on unnecessary tests and procedures. In 2017, a joint report between Choosing Wisely Canada and the Canadian Institute for Health Information found up to 30% of tests and treatments were unnecessary based on eight campaign recommendations. In light of these concerns, Choosing Wisely Canada hopes to optimize value, reduce waste and improve patient outcomes by promoting patient-physician conversations about low-value care.

== History ==
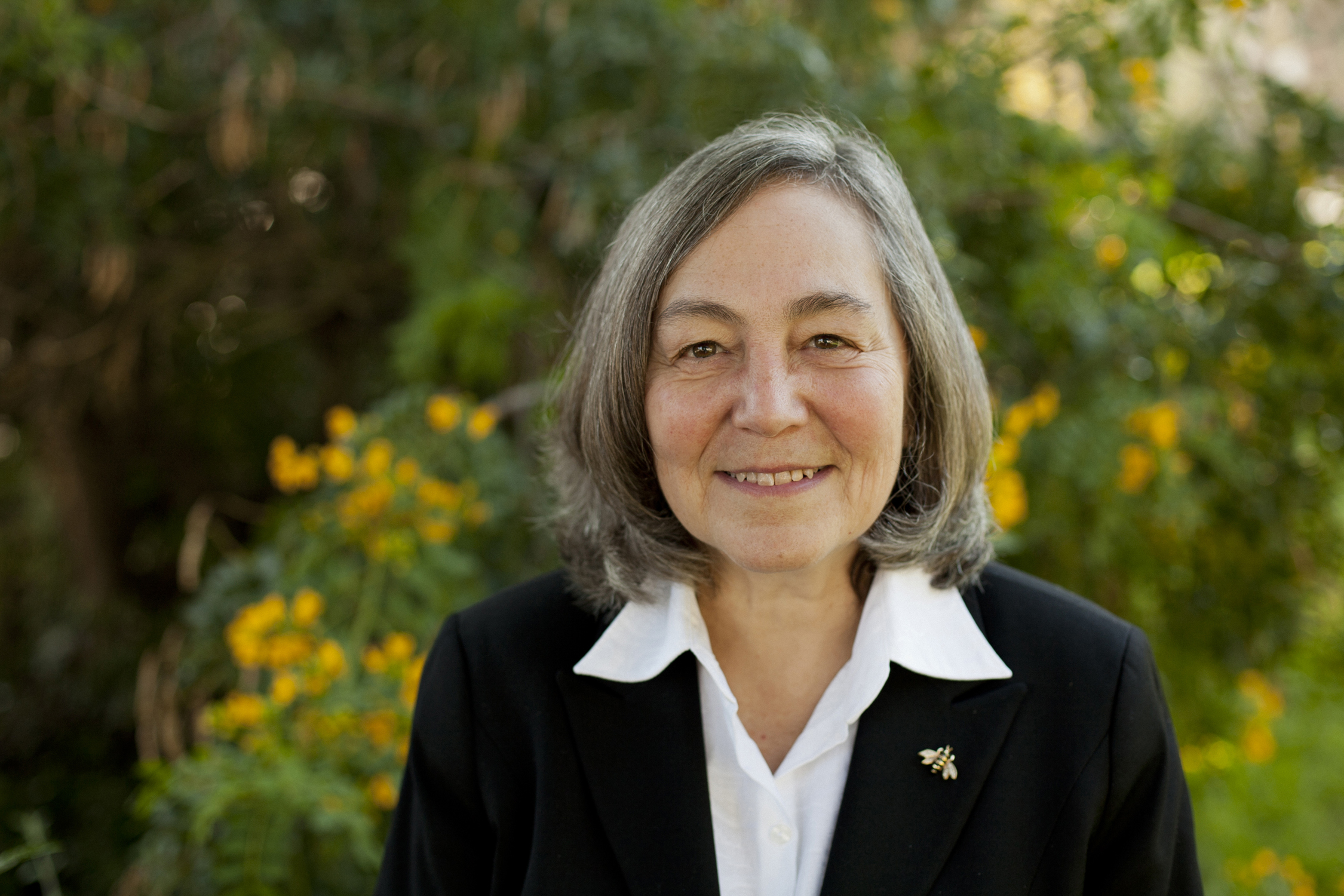
Wendy Levinson, chair of Choosing Wisely Canada

Choosing Wisely Canada is modeled after the Choosing Wisely campaign launched by the ABIM Foundation of the American Board of Internal Medicine in the United States in 2012. Wendy Levinson, a Canadian physician and previous chair of the ABIM Board of Directors, was involved in launching the Choosing Wisely campaign in the United States. After its successful launch, she decided to bring the movement to Canada and partnered with the Canadian Medical Association and the University of Toronto to launch Choosing Wisely Canada on April 2, 2014. In the first wave of the campaign, nine national medical specialty societies released evidence-based lists of 41 tests, treatments and procedures that provided no benefit or potentially caused harm to patients.

Under the leadership of Wendy Levinson and the Canadian Medical Association, Choosing Wisely Canada initially gained momentum in Ontario and subsequently became a national movement. The second and third waves of physician recommendation lists and patient education materials were launched on October 29, 2014, and June 2, 2015, respectively. As of June 2, 2015, more than 80 Canadian medical specialty societies are engaged and at various stages of recommendations development. In total, 400 clinician recommendations and 39 lay language patient educational materials have been released in the three waves from 2014–2015.

== Campaign ==
Choosing Wisely Canada has adopted a multi-faceted campaign approach, engaging clinicians, patients, and medical trainees at all levels. The campaign has partnered with more than 80 Canadian medical specialty societies to develop evidence-supported lists of "Things Clinicians and Patients Should Question", hoping to promote conversation about inappropriate care. The underlying premise is that clinicians must lead such conversations, since they determine the appropriate or inappropriate use of resources. CWC has also developed complementary patient-friendly education materials, and has begun to embed lessons focusing on resource stewardship in undergraduate and postgraduate medical curricula. In order to unify grassroots projects occurring across Canada to implement clinician recommendations, CWC additionally developed the Early Adopters Collaborative, which serves as a "learning platform for sharing knowledge, tools and experiences among participating organizations".

=== Clinician Recommendations Lists ===
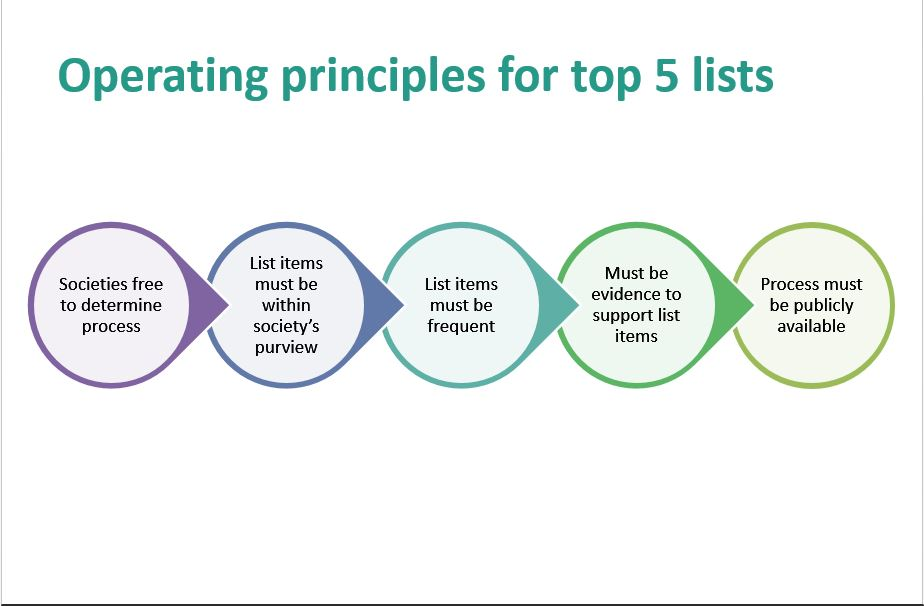
CWC List Development Process

At the core of the campaign are lists of "Things Clinicians and Patients Should Question" developed by national specialty societies representing a broad spectrum of clinicians. These lists contain tests, treatments or procedures commonly used in their specialty, but which are not supported by evidence, and/or could expose patients to unnecessary harm.

List items recommend practices to be avoided and typically begin with the word "Don't" or "Avoid"; for example, one of the recommendations released in the first wave of the campaign was Don't order screening chest X-rays and ECGs for asymptomatic or low risk outpatients. National specialty societies are free to determine the process for generating their lists, as long as they are done in accordance with the following principles:

1. The development process is thoroughly documented and publicly available
2. Each recommendation is within the specialty's scope of practice (and not pertaining to other specialties such as family medicine)
3. Tests, treatments or procedures included are those that (a) are frequently used, and, (b) may expose patients to harm or stress.
4. Each recommendation is supported by evidence

Choosing Wisely Canada recommendations are not intended to be used to establish payment and coverage decisions. Rather, the lists are meant to spur conversation about what is appropriate and necessary treatment. As each patient situation is unique, Choosing Wisely Canada recommends that its materials be used as guidelines for clinicians and patients to determine an appropriate treatment plan together.

=== Patient education ===
In order to encourage patients to initiate conversations about unnecessary care, Choosing Wisely Canada uses patient-friendly materials with lay language to complement the lists of "Five Things Clinicians and Patients Should Question". These patient educational materials are meant to inform patients about the tests, treatments and procedures used within various medical specialties, when they may or may not be necessary, and what patients can do to improve their overall health. For example, one of the patient educational materials released on June 2, 2015, addressed concerns regarding the amount of bed rest required to treat lower back pain, advising that staying in bed longer than 48 hours will not help, and in fact, may actually delay recovery.

An editorial was written by Wendy Levinson in The Toronto Star as a part of the weekly feature titled "Doctor's Notes". The article highlighted the Choosing Wisely campaign and encouraged patients to engage in conversations with their physicians about unnecessary care.

=== Other campaign avenues ===
Healthcare stakeholder groups have mobilized around the CWC campaign at provincial and local levels. Choosing Wisely Canada has regional campaigns in all provinces and territories. At the local level, hospitals, health regions and clinician groups across the country are working under their own initiative to find innovative ways to put the recommendations into practice. Such local implementation efforts are beginning to emerge across Canada, with activities ranging from clinician and patient education, to modifying clinical processes and information systems, to providing data back to providers about their practice patterns.

Another major aspect of the campaign is engaging medical trainees at all levels. The Draft 2015 CanMEDS Framework identifies leadership as one of seven essential physician competencies, urging medical professionals to "engage in the stewardship of health care resources", particularly to "allocate health care resources for optimal patient care" and "to apply evidence and management processes to achieve cost-appropriate care". In order to embody these ideals, CWC is working with Canadian medical schools to introduce new content focussing on resource stewardship into the undergraduate, postgraduate and continuing medical education curricula.

On the media front, the campaign includes partnerships with patient organizations and media outlets to develop and disseminate complementary content to increase patient awareness, and to support them in conversations surrounding inappropriate care.

== Examples ==
Choosing Wisely Canada recommendations range from avoiding overuse of broad practices such as unnecessary and potentially harmful screening, diagnostic and radiographic services, to specific tests which are not supported by evidence to improve patient outcomes.

Examples of recommendations which advise against overuse of broad practices include:

- Don't perform routine cancer screening, or surveillance for a new primary cancer, in the majority of patients with metastatic disease.
- Don't perform annual stress cardiac imaging or advanced non-invasive imaging as part of routine follow-up in asymptomatic patients.

Examples of specific low-value tests to avoid in certain circumstances include:

- Don't order serum testosterone in men without symptoms of hypogonadism.
- Don't order thrombophilia testing in women with early pregnancy loss.

== Challenges ==
Campaign leaders have identified a number of challenges which could potentially undermine the efforts of Choosing Wisely Canada. Since reducing unnecessary tests and procedures may result in lowering healthcare costs, the campaign may be viewed as a cost-cutting or rationing measure, which could in turn "undermine both physician engagement and patient trust." Consequently, the campaign is centered around patient safety with particular emphasis on quality of care. Furthermore, Choosing Wisely Canada recommendations do not determine payment for individual services.

Some physicians report feeling pressure to engage in defensive medicine (e.g., ordering more tests than necessary) because they feel that it will help them avoid litigation. The Canadian healthcare system is also set up so that specialty physicians get paid for tests and procedures conducted, and not for practicing conservative medicine. Such a system may create a pattern for physicians to recommend more treatment. This pattern may also contribute to unwilling of physicians to put recommendations on their lists pertaining specifically to their specialty, instead focusing their recommendations on overuse by other specialties.

Evaluation of the campaign has also been identified as a major challenge. Campaign leaders concede that measuring the impact of Choosing Wisely is complex and may require multiple approaches, including physician and patient awareness of the campaign, documented curriculum inclusion in medical curricula, and demonstrated reduction in unnecessary testing following campaign efforts. Measuring progress of reduction in inappropriate care is particularly complex, since "the definition of appropriateness often includes knowing about symptoms and physical exam findings often not included in electronic health records and administrative databases". Recognizing the complexity of evaluation efforts, Choosing Wisely Canada along with other international Choosing Wisely movements is working with the Organization for Economic Co-operation and Development to develop metrics that might be used to compare countries on specific measures of overuse, as well to develop cross-country metrics.

Since patient education is a core facet of the campaign, communication with patients presents another challenge. Some campaign recommendations may require clinical education for complete comprehension. Furthermore, many patients tend to follow physician recommendations without question, even if they have questions. As such, a major portion of the campaign focuses on encouraging patients to initiate conversations about unnecessary care. Additionally, Choosing Wisely Canada has developed patient-friendly materials with straightforward, lay language to explain common tests, with a "When you need them and when you don't" approach. These materials complement the lists of "Five Things Physicians and Patients Should Question" developed by specialty societies.

== Reception ==
- Dr. Danielle Martin's Three Ideas To Improve Canadian Healthcare

The response to Choosing Wisely Canada has been positive, with clinicians across the country expressing support for the campaign and highlighting the need for more resource stewardship. Danielle Martin, family physician and Vice-President Medical Affairs and Health Systems Solutions at Women's College Hospital, lists Choosing Wisely Canada as one of three major ideas to improve Canadian healthcare, highlighting that "Choosing Wisely Canada is not a rationing or cost-cutting exercising. It is about reorganizing healthcare services so we only do things for people that truly benefit their health." Chris Simpson, past president of the Canadian Medical Association, Professor of Medicine and Chief of Cardiology at Queen's University, Kingston, notes "Physicians are really embracing the principles behind Choosing Wisely. It's all about the right thing to do for patients and avoiding the harm that can come from unnecessary testing. Let's do more of what works and…and less of what is done 'just in case'. Society expects us to lead the way, and the physicians of Canada intend to do just that".

Rick Glazier, senior scientist in primary care and population health at the Institute for Clinical Evaluative Sciences in Toronto, highlights two aspects of the campaign that he believes are unique and have great potential. "The first", he states, "is that it's targeted to the public, and the second is that it's driven not only by scientists and medical journals, but by the professional organizations themselves. For radiologists to come forward and say you shouldn't order radiology tests under these circumstances, this is unprecedented".

The final report of the Advisory Panel on Healthcare Innovation to Rona Ambrose, Minister of Health (Canada), saluted Choosing Wisely Canada "as an innovative physician-led and patient-centered approach that has the potential to shift healthcare away from a culture of consumption to a focus on appropriateness and quality of care". Furthermore, the panel urged "governments to support the implementation of [Choosing Wisely Canada] in all jurisdictions and to carefully evaluate its impact".

In addition to endorsements from eminent physician leaders and professional organizations, Choosing Wisely Canada received positive media coverage in national media sources, including The Globe and Mail, the Canadian Broadcasting Corporation, and the Toronto Star, which heralded Choosing Wisely Canada as one of the top medical breakthroughs of the year.

On the other hand, early criticism of Choosing Wisely in the United States highlighted that some specialty recommendations addressed overuse of resources by primary care specialties, instead of addressing unnecessary tests and procedures conducted by their own specialty colleagues. Choosing Wisely Canada responded to such criticisms by setting guidelines for its list development, which required recommendations put forward by specialty societies to pertain specifically to the specialty's scope of practice.

Many physician bloggers assert that most medical overuse is a result of practicing defensive medicine in an effort to avoid lawsuits. Others recognize the noble goal of reducing overuse and harm, but lament that the lists are too simplistic and do not necessarily advance the identification of low-value care, but merely synthesize "agreed-upon, well-established practices".

A critique of the Choosing Wisely campaign published in The Journal of the American Medical Association by Clement and Charlton highlights a number of shortcomings in the overall movement. While the critique commends the campaign for succeeding in its goal of promoting conversations about low-value care, the authors of the critique believed that the process of list development were based on "quasi-systematic methods that focus on physician participation to increase support". The critique additionally called for increased evidence of the efficacy of the "Top Five" lists in terms of reduction in wasteful practices. Clement and Charlton furthermore warn of "Top Five List Burnout", noting that when faced with multiple guidelines on a single topic, physicians become confused regarding which protocol to follow. In spite of these criticisms, Clement and Charlton "strongly believe in the global spirit behind the Choosing Wisely campaigns and movement" and "advocate that the priority in 2015 should be thoughtful implementation and rigorous evaluation of existing top five lists".

== Impact ==
Choosing Wisely Canada has identified a multifaceted evaluation approach to measure its impact, which includes:

- Physician attitudes and self-reported experience (through physician surveys)
- Patient receptiveness to campaign messages
- Reduction in ordering of low-value tests and procedures
- Implementation in medical education

Evaluation of campaign impact on patient education and receptiveness included a randomized control trial entitled EMPOWER (Eliminating Medications Through Patient Ownership of End Results), led by Cara Tannenbaum, geriatrician and professor in the Faculties of Medicine and Pharmacy at the Université de Montréal. The trial recruited more than 300 patients aged 65–95 years in the greater Montréal area who were long term users of benzodiazepines. Approximately half the patients were exposed to educational intervention, which included Choosing Wisely recommendations around excessive benzodiazepine therapy. The patients were then followed for 6 months. The study found that 62% of patients who received the intervention initiated conversation regarding benzodiazepine therapy discontinuation with physicians and/or pharmacists. After six months, 27% of the intervention group had stopped taking benzodiazepines, compared with 5% of the patients who did not receive the educational intervention.

The impact of Choosing Wisely Canada on test ordering and utilization was studied at the North York General Hospital in the Greater Toronto Area, one of the early adopters of the campaign. A multi-faceted campaign was implemented particularly in the hospital Emergency Department in June, 2014. Test utilization in the Emergency Department was analyzed between September 15 and November 21, 2014, and compared to the same 10-week period in 2013 to account for any seasonal variances. The study found a 41% decline in the number of laboratory tests ordered pre- and post- CWC program implementation, without any observable change in outcomes. A preliminary cost analysis revealed annual departmental savings of approximately $215,000 while maintaining the same quality of care.

A quality improvement initiative based on CWC principles was launched under the supervision of Danielle Martin at the Women's College Hospital (WCH) in Toronto. The American Thyroid Association and Choosing Wisely Canada recommends testing only Thyroid Stimulating Hormone (TSH) levels rather than testing both TSH and free thyroid hormones (such as T4) for assessment of suspected hypothyroidism, since majority of patients with hypothyroidism will present with abnormal TSH levels. A baseline audit at Women's College Hospital revealed that 60% of all free thyroid hormones tests were performed in patients who had normal TSH levels, amounting to approximately $50,000 annually in additional laboratory testing expenditure. A "Reflex T4" approach was implemented at WCH, wherein free T4 tests would not be conducted unless TSH levels are abnormal, or if there are clinical indications of situations when measurement of free thyroid hormones would be necessary. When it is found that TSH levels are abnormal, free T4 levels would then be automatically measured. In addition to reducing inappropriate thyroid function testing, the impact of Choosing Wisely Canada is felt through numerous physician and patient awareness campaigns conducted at the hospital.

Medical education efforts of CWC are currently centered at the University of Toronto, where Choosing Wisely principles are integrated into the undergraduate and postgraduate medical curricula through Problem-Based Learning seminars, lectures, resident research projects and academic half days.

Following the example of Choosing Wisely in the United States and Choosing Wisely Canada, health leaders from Australia, Austria, Brazil, Denmark, England, France, Germany, India, Israel, Italy, Japan, Netherlands, New Zealand, South Korea, Switzerland, and Wales have committed to initiating similar campaigns revolving around medical stewardship and low-value care in their respective countries. Italy has integrated the principles of Choosing Wisely in a campaign called "Doing more does not mean doing better", and the Netherlands has launched "Choosing Wisely Netherlands", both contributing to a growing international Choosing Wisely movement

== Partners ==
Choosing Wisely Canada is supported by the University of Toronto, Unity Health Toronto (Toronto) and the Canadian Medical Association. It receives funding from the Canadian Medical Association, along with grants from federal, provincial and territorial ministries of health, and other partner organizations and agencies.

The specialty societies participating in the campaign include:

- Association of Medical Microbiology and Infectious Disease Canada
- Canadian Academy of Child and Adolescent Psychiatry
- Canadian Academy of Geriatric Psychiatry
- Canadian Academy of Sport and Exercise Medicine
- Canadian Anesthesiologists Society
- Canadian Association for the Study of the Liver
- Canadian Association of Emergency Physicians
- Canadian Association of Gastroenterology
- Canadian Association of General Surgeons
- Canadian Association of Medical Oncologists
- Canadian Association of Nuclear Medicine
- Canadian Association of Pediatric Surgeons
- Canadian Association of Pathologists
- Canadian Association of Radiation Oncology
- Canadian Association of Radiologists
- Canadian Cardiovascular Society
- Canadian Critical Care Society
- Canadian Dermatology Association
- Canadian Geriatrics Society
- Canadian Headache Society
- Canadian Hematology Society
- Canadian Medical Association Forum on General and Family Practice Issues
- Canadian Neurological Society
- Canadian Nurses Association
- Canadian Orthopaedic Association
- Canadian Paediatric Society
- Canadian Pain Society
- Canadian Pharmacists Association
- Canadian Psychiatric Association
- Canadian Rheumatology Association
- Canadian Society for Surgical Oncology
- Canadian Society for Transfusion Medicine
- Canadian Society for Vascular Surgery
- Canadian Society of Allergy and Clinical Immunology
- Canadian Society of Clinical Chemists
- Canadian Society of Echocardiography
- Canadian Society of Hospital Medicine
- Canadian Society of Internal Medicine
- Canadian Society of Nephrology
- Canadian Society of Palliative Care Physicians
- Canadian Society of Respiratory Therapists
- Canadian Society of Endocrinology and Metabolism
- Canadian Spine Society
- Canadian Thoracic Society
- Canadian Urological Association
- College of Family Physicians of Canada
- Occupational Medicine Specialists of Canada
- Society of Obstetricians and Gynaecologists of Canada
- Trauma Association of Canada

The campaign is also endorsed by all the Canadian provincial and territorial medical associations:

- Alberta Medical Association
- Doctors of BC
- Doctors Manitoba
- Doctors Nova Scotia
- Medical Society of PEI
- New Brunswick Medical Society
- Newfoundland and Labrador Medical Association
- Ontario Medical Association
- Quebec Medical Association
- Saskatchewan Medical Association

The national medical organizations endorsing CWC include:

- Canadian Association of Professors of Medicine
- Canadian Partnership Against Cancer
- Royal College of Physicians and Surgeons of Canada

Choosing Wisely Canada has also partnered with a number of patient and community groups which include:

- Canadian Arthritis Patient Alliance
- Canadian Association of Retired Teachers
- Canadian Association of Social Workers
- Consumer Reports Health
- Gastrointestinal Society
- National Association of Federal Retirees
- Patients Canada
