= Yvette Miller =

American physician

Yvette Marie Miller is an American physician specializing in transfusion medicine who is known for her advocacy for sickle cell patients and increasing blood donations in the Black community.

== Early life and education ==
Miller grew up in Winston-Salem near the local office of the American Red Cross, which her mother explained was an agency that helped people in crisis. Miller earned her undergraduate degree in nursing from the University of North Carolina Charlotte. She was a member of Delta Sigma Theta sorority. Miller attended Charles R. Drew University of Medicine and Science and University of North Carolina medical school. She completed her clinical pathology residency at UT Southwestern.

== Career ==
After completing her fellowship in blood banking and transfusion medicine at the National Institutes of Health, Miller served as medical director of the American Red Cross Arizona region, overseeing apheresis collections and clinical services. She subsequently became executive medical director of the Donor and Client Support Center in Charlotte, NC. Her work included overseeing donor eligibility and safety, investigating transfusion reactions, and addressing transfusion needs for sickle cell patients. She served as Black, Indigenous and People of Color (BIPOC) Committee co-chair for the Academy of Integrative Health & Medicine. In 2022, the NIH Clinical Center Department of Transfusion Medicine awarded its Richard J. Davey, M.D. Lectureship to Miller for her contributions to research, education, and clinical practice and her efforts to increase the recruitment of minority blood donors. In 2024, Miller received AABB's Hemphill-Jordan Leadership Award for advancing health equity for both providers and patients.

== Awards ==
- 2024 Hemphill-Jordan Leadership Award, AABB
- 2022 Richard J. Davey, M.D. Lectureship Award, NIH Clinical Center, Department of Transfusion Medicine
