= Transfusion practitioner =

There are more than 100 different titles that are used as another name to Transfusion Practitioner (TP). The most common titles used include Transfusion Practitioner, Haemovigilance Officer, Transfusion Safety Officer, Transfusion Nurse, Patient Blood Management (PBM) Practitioner, and PBM Nurse.

The role of the TP has a long history with roles being in place since late 1990's and early 2000's in countries such as United Kingdom (UK), Australia, United States of America and Canada. A range of healthcare professionals from various clinical specialities undertakes the TP role. Many have a nursing, midwifery or scientific qualification, although, in some countries, medical officers undertake aspects of the role.

== Focus of Transfusion Practitioners ==
It is a specialist role focusing on patient safety through best practice and appropriate use of blood and blood products. Much of the work of TPS centres on aligning practices with local, national, or international standards and guidelines. There are many activities that comprise the TP role and some or all of these may be within TPs position (job) descriptions depending on the area they work, and the strategic direction of the organisation they work in. TP activities aim to increase awareness and knowledge to improve clinical decision making and enhance practice. Transfusion practice require a multidisciplinary approach and TPs are seen as the link between different health professionals and departments, such as clinical and laboratory colleagues, as well as patients. To comply with governance, regulations and mandatory standards many organisations have established Blood Management Committees or Hospital Transfusion Committees. A TPs responsibilities include risk management, surveillance of appropriate use, coordinating patient blood management strategies, blood waste minimisation and investigation and analysis of events. These committees ideally include multidisciplinary membership, and provide support, guidance, and endorsement of the TP activities. The TP plays an essential role in supporting the work of the committee. Transfusion Practitioners improve transfusion practice by promoting safe transfusion practice in a variety of ways. Activities of the TP may include:

- Haemovigilance – incident management, investigation, follow-up, and reporting
- Risk management including writing, implementing, updating and monitoring local policies and procedures
- Blood management education
- Monitoring and providing feedback on activities related to compliance with best practice guidelines including auditing
- Change management activities
- Appropriate use and management including waste minimisation
- Assisting with the implementation of PBM strategies

== Haemovigilance ==
Haemovigilance is the set of surveillance procedures that monitors, reports, investigates, and analyses adverse events related to transfusion. It covers the entire blood transfusion chain, from blood donation and processing of blood and its components, through to their provision and transfusion to patients. These reporting systems play a fundamental role in enhancing patient safety by learning from failures and then putting system changes in place to prevent them in the future. The TP's involvement in haemovigilance within the hospital setting, starts with education of those involved in the transfusion process so they can recognise, manage, and report reactions. The TPs roles ensures clinical transfusion incidents, transfusion reactions, specimen labelling errors are investigated and report data to haemovigilance governance programmes (e.g. SHOT in the UK). By conducting process reviews and communicating directly with the relevant colleagues and patients, the TP can provide essential details that are needed to complete investigations. This information can assist with determining the transfusion reaction type and recommendations for future transfusion plans for the patient, or the implementation of corrective and preventative measures. National haemovigilance schemes e.g. SHOT provide the TP with a resource for educating clinical colleagues on transfusion safety and recommendations for best practice.

== Education ==
Developing and implementing blood management/transfusion related education sessions/programs is an important aspect of the TP role. Education can be targeted for the appropriate clinical groups (nursing, medical and allied health professionals) highlighting and promoting evidence-based practice change or national and international recommendations. TPs act as a resource regarding transfusion and PBM information for all staff involved in the transfusion process. They develop, deliver, evaluate, and revise transfusion-practice/PBM educational content based on evidence-based practice and national/international recommendations. Education topics include, but are not limited to:

- Information about blood components and products
- Consent
- Patient identification
- Sample labelling
- Storage, transport, and cold chain concepts
- Infusion rates/times and fluid compatibility
- Patient monitoring
- Transfusion reactions: how to recognise, manage and report

TPs collaborate with department heads and senior management to facilitate mandatory and non-mandatory staff education/training consistent with regulatory requirements/recommendations.

== Audit ==
Surveillance is often achieved through audits which helps to identify gaps in practice, compliance to standards and guidelines and staff knowledge deficits. Data collection through audit supports governance and practice improvement, where the results can be used to consolidate practice or drive change as required. The TP plays an important role in auditing and reporting to the blood management committee (or equivalent) to develop locally agreed action plans to implement quality improvements arising from audits. The TP liaison role between departments and clinical specialties helps them to facilitate and manage improvements/change involving and engaging appropriate stakeholders. TPs participate in local, regional or national audits. Audit activities may include:

- Development, implementation, analysis and reporting
- Leading quality improvement initiatives based on audit findings.

An example from the UK is the National Comparative Audit of Blood Transfusion (NCABT), which is a programme of clinical audits that look at the use and administration of blood and blood components in the National Health System (NHS) and independent hospitals in the UK. This audit programme's objectives are to provide evidence that blood is being prescribed and used appropriately and administered safely. It also highlights where practice is deviating from the guidelines and how this might affect patient outcomes. Data collection for these audits can be undertaken by a variety of health care professionals within the participating organisations, however the majority of the data collection and data submission is undertaken by the TP.

== Patient Blood Management ==
Patient blood management is a patient-centered, systematic, evidence-based approach to improve patient outcomes by managing and preserving a patient's own blood, while promoting patient safety and empowerment.” TP's can play an active role in helping to establish and embed PBM practices to improve patient and safety outcomes. Some PBM practices activities that TPs could undertake include:

- Promoting appropriate transfusion practices in line with local, national, or international guidelines through education +/or policy and procedure development
- Education about using single-unit transfusion, where safe to do so (add reference to Choosing wisely) and auditing practice
- Promoting practices that reduce the risk of iatrogenic anaemia
- Working with a multidisciplinary group to assess the need for introducing pre-operative anaemia management pathways and/or anaemia clinics
- Encouraging the use of electronic decision-making and prescribing tools where feasible.

The broad reach of the TP allows them to develop constructive working relationships with the many clinical users of blood products and assists with the implementation of PBM programmes.

== Skills & Abilities ==
The TP role demands highly skilled and component health care professionals. Typical PT skills/abilities are:

- Effective communication
- Collaboration
- Critical thinking and problem solving
- Data management
- Project management
- Quality improvement and change Management
- Function within a multidisciplinary setting

Information to build a business case and on TP activities.

James Challan provided a classic description of a TP:

"She is a seemingly arbitrary woman, this TP, because she knows what she is talking about better than anyone else. She is a philosopher and a metaphysician; she has, I believe, an absolutely open mind. This, with an iron nerve, a temper of the ice-brook, and indomitable resolution, self-command, and toleration exalted from virtues to blessings, and the kindliest and truest heart that beats, these form her equipment for the noble work that she is doing for mankind, work both in theory and practice, for her views are as wide as her all-embracing sympathy."
