= Environmental stewardship =

Core principle of social ecology

Environmental stewardship (or planetary stewardship) refers to the responsible use and protection of the natural environment through active participation in conservation efforts and sustainable practices by individuals, small groups, nonprofit organizations, federal agencies, and other collective networks. Aldo Leopold (1887–1948) championed environmental stewardship in land ethics, exploring the ethical implications of "dealing with man's relation to land and to the animals and plants which grow upon it."

== Scales of stewardship ==
At a global or planetary scale, environmental stewardship extends beyond localized conservation to address systemic, interconnected earth systems. Rather than simply mitigating harm or maintaining the environmental status quo, modern planetary stewardship emphasizes active intervention to reverse ecological degradation and stabilize the biosphere. This approach incorporates emerging frameworks such as climate restoration, which seeks to maximize ecological and technological interventions to safely return atmospheric greenhouse gas concentrations to pre-industrial levels. Examples of large-scale stewardship strategies include marine permaculture, which deploys deep-ocean irrigation technologies to regenerate degraded marine ecosystems, rebuild primary productivity, and enhance natural carbon sequestration processes.

== Types of environmental stewardship ==
Environmental stewardship is conducted by different actors, including individuals, non-governmental organizations (NGOs), businesses, governments, and others. Environmental stewardship happens when an actor uses their unique positions of power and decision-making to take actions that protect and restore the environment. Examples of environmental stewardship on the individual level include making environmentally conscious decisions such as purchasing produce that is in season or limiting consumption of plastic products by utilizing reusable items. Nonprofit organizations and other non-governmental organizations (NGOs), at levels varying from local to international, also play a large role in spearheading many of the initiatives categorized as environmental stewardship actions. This includes initiatives that increase awareness on issues related to the environment, meaningful environmental restoration efforts, and activism that motivates individuals, communities, and governments to make sustainable changes. Individuals within communities and across the globe can come together as environmental stewards through the various actions spearheaded by NGOs.

Examples of these initiatives include charitable funds for the replanting of trees in rainforests, beach cleanups, or food banks that reduce food waste by redistributing regularly discarded food from grocery stores to low-income communities. An example of environmental stewardship by businesses is when a business sources sustainable and renewable materials for the production of their products. Governments can simultaneously foster or enforce environmental stewardship within businesses through emissions caps, financial incentives to reduce emissions, waste disposal regulations, green taxes, and more. Governments can also foster or enforce environmental stewardship on community and individual levels through incentives or regulations.

Resilience-based ecosystem stewardship is a type of environmental stewardship that emphasizes ecological resilience as an integral feature of responding to and interacting with the environment in a constantly changing world. Resilience refers to the ability of a system to recover from disturbance and return to its basic function and structure. For example, ecosystems do not serve as singular resources but rather are function-dependent in providing an array of ecosystem services. Additionally, this type of stewardship recognizes resource managers and management systems as influential and informed participants in the natural systems that are serviced by humans. Resilience-based ecosystem stewardship actions aim to prepare an ecosystem for expected stress and disasters by proactively building up its resilience so that it can successfully recover when it does face those anticipated stressor events. This is different than risk management which is focused on preventing or minimizing the risk of disaster from happening in the first place. In agriculture, this form of stewardship could look like the breeding of more drought resistant crops out of the expectation that climate change will worsen and lead to more severe droughts in the future. Additionally, maintaining high biodiversity is crucial in fostering ecosystem resilience, therefore efforts that revolve around protecting species biodiversity through the creation of protected areas, such as National Parks or Marine Protected Areas (MPAs), would also be considered resilience-based ecosystem stewardship.

Through the framework of civic environmental stewardship, environmental stewardship is intrinsically linked to grassroots and community led environmental restoration and protection efforts - "civic ecology practices" - such as, community gardening. The execution of these practices builds up experiential knowledge within a community - a form of environmental education that helps individuals come to better see and understand their role in protecting and restoring their local environment, and the Earth as a whole.

Volunteerism is a prominent piece of civic environmental stewardship, therefore actions taken under this form of stewardship are often spearheaded by nonprofit NGOs and other grassroots groups that rely on the voluntary participation of community members for success. Community here is defined broadly and can be applied on different scales such as a neighborhood, city, state, nation, multiple nations, or the entire globe. Different NGOs and grassroots movements often collaborate with each other in order to broaden this definition of communities and take actions at larger scales. Additionally, NGO and grassroots movements can increase the impacts of civic efforts and increase volunteerism through education, advocacy, research, result monitoring, and more. This approach therefore fosters a closer sense of connection to one's natural environment and community locally, globally, and everything in between.

Management-based environmental stewardship focuses on the responsibility of businesses, organizations, and governments to manage resources sustainably, and use their particular positions of power and influence to protect, rather than harm, the natural environment. Since these institutions are often profit-driven, resource extraction is fundamental to their operations. This form of stewardship seeks to prevent exploitative extraction. However, competing financial interests still remain a barrier to more businesses taking on the role of environmental stewardship. Additionally, not all institutions under these categories hold the necessary environmental expertise, so collaboration with scientific research institutions is crucial for informing sustainable management decisions. One example of this form of stewardship can be seen through hospitals in the United States that partner with the Afya Foundation which collects unused medical supplies before they are discarded in order to distribute them to lower-income countries with medical supply shortages,

== Social science implications ==
Studies have explored the benefits of environmental stewardship in various contexts such as the evaluation, modeling, and integration into policy, system management, and urban planning. One study examined how social attributes of environmental stewardship can be used to reconfigure local conservation efforts. Social ties to environmental stewardship are emphasized by the National Recreation and Park Association's efforts to place environmental stewardship at the forefront of childhood development and youths' consciousness of the outdoors. Practicing environmental stewardship has also been suggested as an effective mental health treatment and natural therapy.

== Roles of environmental stewards ==
Based on pro-organizational stewardship theory principles, environmental stewards can be categorized into three roles: doers, donors, and practitioners.

Doers actively engage in environmental aid, such as volunteering for hands-on work like cleaning up oil spills. Donors support causes financially or through gifts in kind, including fundraising or personal donations. Practitioners work daily in environmental stewardship, acting as advocates in collaboration with various environmental agencies and groups. All three roles contribute to promoting environmental literacy and encouraging participation in conservation efforts.

From a biocultural conservation perspective, Ricardo Rozzi and collaborators propose participatory intercultural approaches to earth stewardship. This perspective emphasizes the role of long-term socio-ecological research (LTSER) sites in coordinating local initiatives with global networking and implementing culturally diverse earth stewardship forms.

== Examples ==
Many programs, partnerships, and funding initiatives have tried to implement environmental stewardship into the workings of society. Pesticide Environmental Stewardship Program (PESP), a partnership program overseen by the US Environmental Protection Agency, provides pesticide-user consultation to reduce the use of hazardous chemicals and identify the detrimental impact these chemicals can have on social and environmental health.

In 2006, England placed environmental stewardship at the center of an agricultural incentives mechanism, encouraging cattle farmers to better manage their land, crops, animals, and material use. The Environmental Stewardship Award was created as part of this initiative to highlight members whose actions exemplify alignment with environmental stewardship.

== See also ==
- Earth system governance – Field of scholarly inquiry in the social sciences
- Ecotheology – Theological reflection on the environment
- Eco hotel – Environmentally sustainable hotel
- Environmental personhood – Legal concept
- Environmental protection – Practice of protecting the natural environment
- Environmental stewardship (England) – UK agri-environment scheme (2005-)
- Evangelical environmentalism – Christian environmental movement
- Indigenous Australian traditional custodianship – Indigenous Australians' relationship with ancestral lands
- Stewardship – Planning and management of resources and processes
- Stewardship (theology) – Divine belief in one's responsibility for the world
