= Laboratory stewardship =

Optimizing use of laboratory tests

Laboratory stewardship is an approach to improving the appropriate use of clinical laboratory services, including the ordering, retrieval, and interpretation of laboratory tests. It seeks to improve the value of laboratory services by balancing the quality and clinical utility of testing against its costs, rather than simply reducing the number of tests performed. Laboratory stewardship may address both overuse and underuse of laboratory testing, with the aim of reducing low-value testing while increasing the use of clinically appropriate testing.

Inappropriate laboratory testing can contribute to diagnostic errors, unnecessary phlebotomy, false positive results, delays in appropriate testing, and cascades of additional investigations, and waste of healthcare resources, while underuse can delay diagnosis and treatment. Studies have estimated that approximately 10–30% of laboratory tests may be unnecessary or inappropriate. Routine blood collection can also cause discomfort and sleep disruption, and repeated phlebotomy can contribute substantially to blood loss in some hospitalized patients. Errors in ordering, retrieving, or interpreting laboratory tests can contribute to delayed or incorrect diagnoses, inappropriate treatment, and other adverse outcomes. Laboratory stewardship therefore forms part of quality improvement and patient safety efforts in laboratory medicine.

== Program structure ==
Laboratory stewardship programs commonly include four components: governance, interventions, data extraction and monitoring, and review of data coupled with strategies for improvement. Governance generally involves institutional leadership, multidisciplinary committees, laboratory expertise, and support from clinical, quality-improvement, financial, and information-technology personnel. Programs may also establish systems to support the appropriate financial coverage of medically necessary laboratory testing.

Data extraction and monitoring can be used to identify patterns of laboratory test utilization, including potential overuse or underuse, and to monitor the effects of stewardship interventions. Monitoring may include test volumes, ordering patterns, costs, the appropriateness of test orders, retrieval of results, and interpretation of results. The resulting data can be reviewed to prioritize opportunities for improvement and guide the selection or modification of stewardship strategies.

The design of stewardship programs and their interventions can vary according to institutional priorities, available resources, and clinical setting. Implementation science can be used to identify behavioral and organizational factors that influence laboratory test use and to select interventions appropriate to those factors.

== Interventions ==
Stewardship interventions can be categorized as gentle, medium-strength, or strong according to the degree to which they constrain test ordering. Gentle interventions include education, guidelines, reminders, and communication of information such as test costs, while medium-strength interventions modify ordering systems or workflows without completely preventing an order. Strong interventions include removal of obsolete tests, laboratory formularies, computerized provider order entry hard stops, and requirements for specialist consultation or higher-level approval for selected tests.

== Monitoring and improvement ==
Stewardship programs use laboratory utilization data to identify opportunities for improvement and evaluate interventions. Monitoring may include the appropriateness of test orders, retrieval of results, interpretation of results, test volumes, costs, and the effects of individual interventions. Broader measures of impact may include blood collection volumes, length of stay, readmission, morbidity, and mortality. Data-driven approaches can also use implementation science to identify behavioral and organizational factors that influence laboratory test use and to select interventions suited to those factors.

Laboratory stewardship programs use multidisciplinary teams and laboratory utilization data to identify inappropriate testing and opportunities for improvement, implement interventions, and assess their effects. Programs can be organized differently depending on institutional priorities, available resources, and the clinical setting. Laboratory stewardship has also been discussed as a means of addressing health equity in laboratory testing.

== Relationship to other stewardship approaches ==
Laboratory stewardship, diagnostic stewardship, and antimicrobial stewardship address related but distinct aspects of healthcare. Laboratory stewardship focuses on the appropriate use of clinical laboratory services, including the ordering, retrieval, and interpretation of laboratory tests. Diagnostic stewardship focuses on the appropriate use of diagnostic testing throughout the diagnostic process, including test ordering, specimen collection and processing, testing, and reporting and interpretation of results. Antimicrobial stewardship focuses on the appropriate use of antimicrobial medicines, including the selection, dosing, route, and duration of treatment.

== See also ==
- Antimicrobial stewardship – Optimizing use of antimicrobials
- Blood management – Set of medical practices
- Clinical decision support – Health information technology
- Diagnostic stewardship – Optimizing use of medical diagnostic tests
- Laboratory medicine – Principles of management with special reference to medical science
- Quality management – Business process to aid consistent product fitness
