= Healthcare in Utah =

This article summarizes healthcare in Utah.

== Utah Department of Health ==
The Utah Department of Health manages state government projects in Utah.

The health insurance marketplace for Utah is Avenue H.

== Hospitals in Utah ==
Utah has hospitals serving every part of the state.

== Health campaigns in Utah ==
HealthInsight, a regional nonprofit organization, organizes the Choosing Wisely campaign in Utah.
