= Taftian theory =

Theory on the powers of the USA president

Taftian theory (also "Whig" theory and literalist theory) is a political term in the United States referring to a strict constructionist view regarding presidential power and the United States Constitution, where a president's power is limited to those powers specifically enumerated by the Constitution.

Taftian Theory was coined after the governing style of the 27th president of the United States, William Howard Taft. Most presidents prior to Franklin D Roosevelt subscribed to this theory, whereas more recent presidents subscribe to a stewardship theory.
