= Souha Kanj =

Academic and doctor from Lebanon

Souha Kanj Sharara
- سهى كنج شرارة
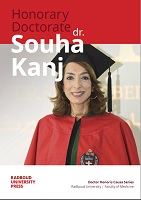
- Born: 1963 (age 62–63); Chyah, Lebanon
- Education: Saint Joseph University, Duke University Medical Center
- Children: 3
- Scientific career
- Fields: Infectious diseases

Souha Kanj Sharara (Arabic: سهى كنج شرارة; born 1963) is a Professor of Medicine, and Chair of the Infection Control and Prevention Program at the American University of Beirut (AUB).

== Education and early life ==
Kanj was born in 1963 in Chyah (الشياح), Lebanon. Married to Ala’ Sharara, with three children. She took the medical exam at Saint Joseph University to please her father, a decision that she never regretted.

She started her medical studies in 1980s and graduated with an MD from Saint Joseph University, Beirut in 1987. Met her husband Ala’ Sharara while doing her training at AUB. After marriage, she left Lebanon with her husband who accepted a residency at Duke University. In 1988 she started her residency at Duke University Medical Center in the USA and completed her residency and internship in 1991. Following that, she pursued fellowships at the same university and in 1992, she became a research associate at Howard Hughes Medical Institute.

== Career ==
She started her career as a research fellow at Howard Hughes Medical Institute and then as a faculty member at Duke University where she established the Infectious Diseases Transplant services in 1994. She joined the American University of Beirut Medical Center (AUBMC) as infectious disease doctor in 1998 and was promoted to Professor in 2007 and to Tenure Professor in 2018. She is the Head of the Infectious Disease Department at AUBMC since 2002, and one of the first women in the Arab world to hold such a position, she serves as Chair of the Infection Control Program and co-Chair of the Antimicrobial Stewardship program at AUBMC. She is also consulting professor at Duke University Medical Center in the United States.

Kanj has contributed to the work of various programmes of the World Health Organization, and in 2020 she was appointed to serve on the WHO COVID-19 Guidance Development Group of experts.

== Research and publications ==
Her clinical and research interests include but are not limited to infections in immune suppressed patients, viral infections, endocarditis, HIV infections, brucellosis, typhoid fever.

She has published more than 250 publications between peer reviewed articles, conference papers and other publications.

Selected high impact peer reviewed articles:

- Tacconelli, Evelina; et al. (2017). "Discovery, research, and development of new antibiotics: the WHO priority list of antibiotic-resistant bacteria and tuberculosis". The Lancet Infectious Diseases. 18 (3): 318–327. doi:10.1016/s1473-3099(17)30753-3. PMID 29276051.
- Marty, Francisco M.; et al. (2016). "Isavuconazole treatment for mucormycosis: a single-arm open-label trial and case-control analysis". The Lancet Infectious Diseases. 16 (7): 828–837. doi:10.1016/s1473-3099(16)00071-2. PMID 26969258.

== Honors and awards ==
Kanj was the recipient of several awards including

- the Lebanese NCSR award (2014)
- Abdul Hameed Shoman award for Arab researchers (2016)
- the Valkhof professorship for women scholars (2108)
- the honorary doctorate (2020) from Radboud University, Nijmegen: the Netherlands
- Award for Arab Women in the Field of Medicine from the League of Arab States (2020)
- Intissar Ahdab Award for Women's Excellence and Impact in Research (2023)

== Professional activities ==
She is actively engaged with multiple committees and organizations working on infection control, and serving as a board member for several of them, including the Alliance for the Prudent Use of Antibiotics (APUA), the International Society of Antimicrobial Chemotherapy (ISAC), the Surveillance and Epidemiology of Drug resistant Infectious Consortium (SEDRIC)

She is also a fellow of the American College of Physicians (ACP), the Infectious Diseases Society of America (IDSA), the Royal College of Physicians (RCP), the European Confederation of Medical Mycology, and the European Society of Clinical Microbiology and Infectious Diseases (ESCMID)

== Interviews and documentaries ==
- Dr. Souha Kanj - Inspiring Journey: In Researcher Ossa Kbire (قصة كبيرة) TV program.
- سهى كنج.. لبنانية تحصل على جائزة "التميز للمرأة العربية
