= Abdul Cader Asmal =

South African physician

Abdul Cader Asmal is a retired physician who was credentialed to practice medicine in South Africa, the United Kingdom and the United States. He is an activist for Islam condemning both ISIS and Islamophobia alike. In promoting the ‘middle path’ of Islam Asmal has partnered with interfaith coalitions of many traditions. In the medical field, he was recognized for his academic achievements in obtaining the following credentials: an MB BS, MD, PhD, FCP, and FRCP and Board Certification in Internal Medicine, and in Endocrinology and Metabolism. In his pursuit of promoting the image of Islam he was elected as president of the Islamic Center of Boston, the Islamic Council of New England and its communications director. For his interfaith work, he was a director of Inter-Religious Center for Public Life, is on the board of the Cooperative Metropolitan Ministries and serves on the Needham Clergy Association and the Human Rights’ Committee.

== Early life ==
Asmal was born in Durban, South Africa, on July 2, 1938. His mother died shortly after his birth. His primary school was a segregated government-aided Methodist school and his middle school was a Government-aided Hindu one. His high school was exclusively for Indians. He was admitted to the White Universities of Cape Town and Witwatersrand to study medicine, but because of his non-White status, government policy denied him permission to study at these White universities.

== Medical training and practice ==
Asmal was accepted at the University of London where he obtained his medical degree in 1963. He completed his residency at the non-White King Edward VIII Hospital in Durban. In 1967, he passed the Board Certification in Internal Medicine at the College of Medicine (FCP). In 1969, he was awarded a scholarship to conduct research into diabetes at Guy's Hospital in London. While there he also passed the Internal Medicine board examination (MRCP) and completed his MD thesis in 1972. Between 1972 and 1980, Asmal served as the physician in charge of diabetes at the King Edward VIII Hospital and its affiliated University of Natal. In 1980, he obtained his PhD from the University of London and was awarded the chance to study diabetes at the Joslin Clinic in Boston. To qualify for entry into and work in the United States he first had to complete the ECFMG and the Visa Qualifying Examinations which he successfully did between 1978 and 1980. During his employment at the Joslin Clinic, Asmal was credentialed by the American Board of Internal Medicine in 1983 and by the Board in Endocrinology and Metabolism in 1985. Between 1980 till his retirement in 2010, Asmal was at one time or another on the staff of the New England Deaconess Hospital, the Brigham and Women's Hospital and the Massachusetts General Hospital and was concomitantly on the Faculty of Harvard Medical School.

== Medical awards ==
- 1969: British Council Scholarship
- 1980: South African Medical Councils Research Award (the first to a non-White)
- 1994: Harvard Pilgrim Outstanding Physician Award
- 1999: Partners Award for Outstanding Performance and Dedication and Consistency in Care and Administration
- 2003: Fellowship of the Royal College of Physicians London Royal College of Physicians, (FRCP): In Recognition of 30 Years Clinical Excellence
- 2006 and 2008: Excellence in Primary Care Award Blue Cross & Blue Shield Sustained Excellence in Primary Care
- During his medical career Asmal had published more than 80 medical papers and delivered speeches at scientific conferences in London, Helsinki, Brussels, Marbella Spain, and New Delhi.

== Muslim activism ==
Asmal was elected as president of the Islamic Center of Boston, The Islamic Council of New England and its communications chairman. He introduced the forum of Intra-Muslim Dialogue to improve communications between different contingents. His pluralistic activities includes work the Massachusetts Council of Churches, the Archdiocese of Boston, the Jewish Communities Relations Council, and after the events of 9/11, wrote a series of articles emphasizing that Al Qaeda should be separated from the conversation of true Islam. He still serves on the Islamic Council, as well as Needham Clergy Association, the Needham Human Rights Committee (and through it the Needham PATH: People Against Trafficking Humans) and a Director on the Board of the Cooperative Metropolitan Ministries.

== Muslim activism awards ==
- For his work within the Muslim community he was given awards by the Islamic Council in 1992, 1997, 2010 and 2015, and by the Islamic Center of Boston Cultural Center in 2004
- 1994 Jewish Community Relations Council's accolade ‘A Partner for the Future’.
- 2014 ‘Lifetime Achievement Award’ by the Islamic Circle of North America.
- 2014 ‘Rabbi Rothman Award ‘For Fostering Interreligious Understanding and Dialogue’ by Andover Newton Theological Seminary.
- 2015 ‘A Lifetime Achievement Award’ from the Cooperative Metropolitan Ministries.

== Limited bibliography ==
- Joslin's Diabetes Mellitus, 12th Edition 1985, Lea and Febiger; Ed. Alexander Marble; A.C. Asmal, Coma in Diabetes
- World Book of Diabetes in Practice, Ed LP Krall, Elsevier, 1985; A.C. Asmal Management of NIDDM
- Current Clinical Practice, Ed FH Messerli, WB Saunders, 1987; A.C. Asmal chapters on Obesity and Coma
- Harvard Medical School Family Health Guide, Ed. A Komaroff; Simon and Schuster 1999; A.C. Asmal Diabetes
- Consumption, Population and Sustainability Ed Chapman, Petersen, Smith Moran, Island Press 2000
- An Agenda of Priorities for Muslims in the US, A.C. Asmal
- ‘Terrorism is not Islamic’: New York Times Op-Ed. August 4, 2005, A.C. Asmal
- The American Muslim: http://www.theamericanmuslim.org/ – search for articles by A.C. Asmal
- ‘Who is a Muslim? An intense struggle within the Muslim World for the Soul of Islam’ A.C. Asmal
