= BBTM =

BBTM may stand for:

- Beauty Behind the Madness, album by the Weeknd
- Blood bank and transfusion medicine, when referred to in conjunction with each other
- Béton bitumineux très mince – type of European (French) asphalt concrete
