= Christine K. Cassel =

Christine K. Cassel is an American physician, author, and professor specializing in geriatric medicine, medical ethics and quality of care. She is a professor of medicine at the University of California, San Francisco (UCSF). She was planning dean of the new Kaiser Permanente School of Medicine from 2016 to 2018. Until March 2016, she was president and CEO of the National Quality Forum. Previously, Cassel served as president and CEO of the American Board of Internal Medicine and the ABIM Foundation.

== Education ==
A graduate of the University of Chicago, Cassel received her medical degree from the University of Massachusetts Medical School and completed a residency in internal medicine at the Children's Hospital of San Francisco and a fellowship in geriatrics at the Veterans Administration Medical Center in Portland, Oregon. Additionally, she completed a bioethics health policy fellowship program at the University of California, San Francisco. Cassel is board certified by the American Board of Internal Medicine in internal medicine and geriatric medicine. Cassel's many honors include being elected to fellowship in the Royal Academy of Medicine of London and the Royal College of Physicians and Surgeons of Canada. She has received several honorary degrees, and was awarded the Walsh McDermott Award for service to the National Academy of Medicine.

== Career ==
Cassel's career in academic medicine included leadership positions as chief of general integral medicine at the University of Chicago, chair of the Department of Geriatrics at Mount Sinai Medical Center and dean of the School of Medicine at Oregon Health Sciences Center.

In the 1980s Cassel was active in the physician movement to reduce the threat of nuclear war. She served on the board of Physicians for Social Responsibility and was president in 1985 when the group was awarded the Nobel Peace Prize as part of the International Physicians for Prevention of Nuclear War.

In 2003 she was selected as the president and CEO of the American Board of Internal Medicine, a post she held for 10 years.

During this time she worked to align specialty board certification with the growing demands for quality measurement and accountability in health care, leading to some controversy. While at ABIM she led the founding of the Choosing Wisely movement, linking physician and consumer interests in reducing the use of low-value care.

In 2013, Cassel was recruited to lead the National Quality Forum (NQF) as president and CEO. The NQF was established as a consequence of the National Commission on Healthcare Quality and Consumer Protection, which she served as commissioner. It is a nonprofit organization that endorses national standards for measuring health care quality. She became known as a physician leader in healthcare quality, dealing with the complexities of a multi-stakeholder consensus organization. During her tenure, NQF continued to play a central role in U.S. health policy, particularly in the development of quality metrics tied to Medicare reimbursement and health system performance evaluation.

Cassel is one of 20 scientists chosen by U.S. President Barack Obama to serve on the President's Council of Advisors on Science and Technology (PCAST). She served on PCAST for the entire Obama administration, from 2009 to 2016. As a member of PCAST, Cassel contributed to national policy discussions on health system reform, comparative effectiveness research, quality of care, electronic health record adoption, and the development of value-based payment models in Medicare.

She led a major PCAST report on technology to improve quality of life and independence for aging Americans that led to changes in regulatory policy that allowed major advancements in hearing aid technology.

In addition to her role on PCAST, Cassel served as a founding board member of the Patient-Centered Outcomes Research Institute (PCORI), which was established in 2010 under the Affordable Care Act (ACA). Her involvement helped shape the early direction of federally supported comparative-effectiveness research intended to improve medical decision-making and patient-centered outcomes.

In 2016, Cassel was asked to help Kaiser Permanente develop a new medical school based on the integrated health system model of KP. She became planning dean, setting up the nonprofit structure, initial certifications and recruiting the board of directors and assisting the board in recruiting the founding dean.

In 2018, she was named presidential chair at UCSF and has remained on the faculty as a professor of medicine.

== Research ==
Cassel's scholarly work spans geriatrics, medical ethics, quality of care, and health policy. Her early research included investigations into long-term care, disability and aging, and the measurement of active life expectancy in older populations. In the domain of geriatrics and aging, Cassel published studies on attitudes toward age-based allocation of health care resources, mortality, disability and falls in older persons, and issues of age and chronic care in the American health system. Early in her career, Cassel focused on the ethical dimensions of research with older adults, including "Research in Nursing Homes: Ethical Issues" (Journal of the American Geriatrics Society, 1985) and "Biomedical Research Involving Older Human Subjects" (1990).

She has also addressed the ethics of end-of-life care and physician-assisted dying, contributing to public policy debates as the practice has become more widely accepted in the United States.

In her recent publications, she has focused on the importance of workplace conditions to physician well-being and the contribution of new AI systems to improving clinician performance and satisfaction.

Cassel has edited foundational textbooks in geriatrics and authored more than 200 journal articles and numerous books, including works such as Medicare Matters: What Geriatric Medicine Can Teach American Health Care. Cassel was instrumental in raising awareness in the medical profession about improving end-of-life care. In the 1990s she published articles calling for more humane care of dying patients and advocating for the ethics of medical aid in dying. In 1996–1997 she chaired an IOM (now National Academy of Medicine) committee and report on Approaching Death: Improving Care at the End of Life, calling for a new medical specialty of palliative care. In 2011, while CEO of the ABIM, she oversaw the founding of board certification for Palliative Medicine.

== Selected bibliography ==
=== Books ===
- Medicare Matters: What Geriatric Medicine Can Teach American Health Care (2005)
- Ethical Patient Care (2000), Geriatric Medicine (Fourth Edition)
- A Practical Guide to Aging (1997), *Approaching Death (1997)
- Encyclopedia of Bioethics (1995), Ethical Dimensions in the Health Professions (1993)
- Nuclear Weapons and Nuclear War: A Sourcebook for Health Professionals (1984)
- Medicare Matters: What Geriatric Medicine Can Teach American Health Care (2005)
- Ethical Patient Care (2000)
- Geriatric Medicine (Fourth Edition), A Practical Guide to Aging (1997)
- Approaching Death (1997)
- Encyclopedia of Bioethics (1995)
- Ethical Dimensions in the Health Professions (1993)

=== Articles ===
- Cassel CK. Statistics and Ethics: Models for strengthening protection of human subjects in clinical research.
- Jain SH, Cassel CK. Societal Perceptions of Physicians: Knights, Knaves or Pawns?
- Cassel, CK, Reuben, DB. Specialization, subspecialization and sub-subspecialization in internal medicine.
- Cassel CK, Guest J. Choosing wisely: helping physicians and patients make smart decisions about their care.
- Cassel CK. Retail clinics and Drugstore Medicine.
- Cassel CK, Jain SH. Assessing Individual Physician Performance-Does Measurement Suppress Motivation?
- Cassel CK, Hood V, Bauer W. A Physician Charter: The Tenth Anniversary. Annals of Internal Medicine, 2012;157(4):290-291
- Conway PH, Cassel CK. Engaging Physicians and Leveraging Professionalism-A key to Success for Quality Management and Improvement.
- Graber ML, Wachter RM, Cassel CK. Bringing Diagnosis Into the Quality and Safety Equations.
- Kesselheim JC, Cassel CK. Service: An Essential Component of Graduate Medical Education.
- Tilburt JC, Cassel CK. Why the Ethics of Parsimonious Medicine Is Not the Ethics of Rationing.
- Agrawal S, Taitsman J, Cassel C. Educating Physicians About Responsible Management of Finite Resources.

== See also ==
- American Board of Medical Specialties
