= Transfusion medicine =

Medical specialty

Transfusion medicine (or transfusiology) is the branch of medicine that encompasses all aspects of the transfusion of blood and blood components including aspects related to hemovigilance. It includes issues of blood donation, immunohematology and other laboratory testing for transfusion-transmitted diseases, management and monitoring of clinical transfusion practices, patient blood management, therapeutic apheresis, stem cell collections, cellular therapy, and coagulation. Laboratory management and understanding of state and federal regulations related to blood products are also a large part of the field.

== Overview ==
In most countries, immunohematology and transfusion medicine specialists provide expert opinion on massive transfusions, difficult/incompatible transfusions and rational use of specialised blood product therapy like irradiated blood/leukodepleted/washed blood products.

The blood donor center is the facility that collects blood components from screened blood donors, either whole blood or separate components such as plasma or platelets only via apheresis. These blood components are then transported to a central location for processing such as fractionation, testing and redistribution. The testing includes determining blood type and testing for infectious diseases. Whole blood is fractionated into red blood cells, platelets and plasma whilst plasma can be further refined into separate components such as albumin, clotting factor concentrates and immunoglobulin.

The blood bank is the section of the clinical laboratory where laboratory scientists store and distribute blood components. Both areas are typically overseen by a specialist in transfusion medicine. Transfusion medicine was earlier a branch of clinical pathology, however the field has now expanded into a clinical, hospital-based specialty. The practice of transfusion medicine involves both laboratory and clinical aspects of transfusion as communication between blood bank and patients, treating specialists and other medical staff is vital in situations such as massive transfusions or transfusion reactions.

To ensure the safety of blood components, regimented procedures and quality assurance systems must be in place covering all aspects of the transfusion chain, from donation to transfusion outcomes. Within hospitals, transfusion committees are established to ensure safe hospital transfusion practice such as compliance with standards and guidelines, reviewing transfusion reactions and management of blood supply. These multidisciplinary committees are composed of transfusion medicine specialists, transfusion nurses, laboratory scientists, clinicians and staff from hospital management and the quality team.

== History ==
In 1628, English physician William Harvey discovered that blood circulates around the body. Soon thereafter, the first blood transfusion was attempted. In 1665 another English doctor Richard Lower successfully used blood transfusion between dogs to keep them alive.

Karl Landsteiner is recognized as the father of transfusion medicine. Landsteiner is credited with the first classification of human blood into the four types (A, B, AB, O) of the ABO blood group system.

== National differences and how to specialise ==
Australia

In Australia, transfusion medicine is a sub-specialty of haematology. Training in transfusion medicine is covered by the Royal College of Pathologists of Australasia (RCPA).

Australia has national blood services operated by the Australian Red Cross Blood Service. There are a series of guidelines and standards relevant to the laboratory released by the National Association of Testing Authorities, Australia (NATA), Australian and New Zealand Society of Blood Transfusion (ANZSBT) and RCPA. Similarly, there are a series of clinical practice, patient blood management guidelines by the National Blood Authority.

In Australia, the Serious Transfusion Incident Reporting (STIR) system is in place to capture serious transfusion incidents and near-miss incidents.

Denmark

In Denmark, the subject is covered by the specialty, "Clinical Immunology".

Germany

In Germany, transfusion medicine is an independent specialty. Physicians complete a three-year residency in transfusion medicine and two years in another relevant clinical settings like internal medicine or surgery.

India

In India, Immunohematology and Transfusion Medicine is a medical post graduate specialty (MD) recognized by Medical Council of India since 2009.

Malaysia

Physicians completing their internship may pursue a four-year Master of Medicine (Transfusion Medicine) programme to specialize in transfusion medicine in Malaysia. They are eligible for registration with National Specialist Registry as transfusion medicine specialists after completion of gazettement upon graduation. Transfusion medicine specialists in Malaysia may further their sub-specialty training in the field of immunohaematology, cord blood, patient blood management, cellular therapy, and regenerative medicine.

Norway

In Norway, the subject is covered by the specialty, "Immunology and Transfusion medicine"

United Kingdom

In the United Kingdom, transfusion medicine is a sub-speciality of hematology.

Serious Hazards of Transfusion (SHOT) collects and analyses reports of adverse events related to transfusion, aiming to improve patient safety. Its reports have led to wider training for medical staff in the UK and a central reporting scheme to allow errors to be reported.

There is the Better Blood Continuing Education Programme, which is organised by the EUB which is part of the SNBTS. The EUB consists of many specialist healthcare professionals. The programme's aim is to improve transfusion medicine practise. The programme is reviewed each annually in January.

In the UK, there are restrictions in place to decrease the risk of the transmission of Creutzfeldt–Jakob disease.

United States

Physicians from a wide range of backgrounds, including pathology, internal medicine, anesthesiology and pediatrics, are eligible for board certification in Transfusion Medicine following a 1–2 year fellowship. It is a board-certified sub-specialty recognized by the American Board of Pathology. These specialists are often considered consultants for physicians who require expert advice on the subjects listed above. Transfusiology is not a recognized term in the US.

== See also ==
- Blood transfusion
- List of blood donation agencies
