= Howard Brody =

American bioethicist and physician (1949–2024)

Howard A. Brody
- Born: June 23, 1949
- Died: July 22, 2024 (aged 75)
- Education: Michigan State University
- Occupations: Physician and bioethicist

Howard A. Brody (June 23, 1949–July 22, 2024) was an American bioethicist and family physician. He was a professor of family medicine at the University of Texas Medical Branch prior to his retirement from there in 2016. For much of his time at the University of Texas Medical Branch, he was the director of the Institute for the Medical Humanities there. Brody performed research in the field of placebo studies.

== Career ==
Brody taught medicine at Michigan State University before leaving the faculty there in 2006. From 1985 to 2006, he directed the Center for Ethics and Humanities in the Life Sciences there.

== Work ==
Brody is known for his extensive writing about the placebo effect and about the pharmaceutical industry. He was critical of increasing medical costs, and was called a "watchdog" in regard to relationships between pharmaceutical companies and medical research. In 2010, he challenged his fellow physicians to identify tests and treatments that did not produce any benefit, which has been credited with inspiring the Choosing Wisely campaign.

== Lawsuit ==
In 2016, Brody filed a complaint against the University of Texas Medical Branch, alleging that the University discriminated against him by placing him on a leave of absence, cutting his salary significantly, and removing him from his position as director of the Institute for the Medical Humanities. He claimed that this was an unusually harsh punishment for his handling of a sexual assault accusation. This complaint ended up becoming a lawsuit in federal court.

== Awards and recognition ==
In 2009, Brody received the American Society for Bioethics and Humanities' Lifetime Achievement Award. He was a Hastings Center Fellow.
