= AskMyGP =

Online general practitioner consultation platform

askMyGP is an online general practitioner consultation platform launched in 2011 by GP Access Ltd, based in Leicestershire.

It aims to improve patient access to healthcare and cut down on unnecessary appointments. The company claims only 30% of patients seeking help need a face-to-face appointment. It gives patients the option of submitting a symptom-related questionnaire online to a GP. In January 2018, it was said to have managed 29,000 patient episodes in a dozen practices.

A pilot scheme backed by the Health and Social Care Board was introduced in Northern Ireland in 2016. This gave patients the option of explaining their symptoms to a receptionist by telephone or completing the same questionnaire on line themselves. One news report found a Falls Road, Belfast practice treataing 2,700 patients looked forward to an outcome from a pilot program using askMyGP.

It was introduced to the Riverside Group Practice in Portadown in 2016. The chair of the British Medical Association's Northern Ireland GP committee said there was pushback initially but it is now more appreciated by clients. When tried at a practice in Ipswich it wasn’t favoured by all the staff at the surgery, but it was reported that "the ability to signpost to the free NHS physiotherapy self-referral service saves face to face surgery appointments.”

Sue Arnott a GP serving 5,000 patients in Shotts, Lanarkshire began using askMyGP in 2018 after two colleagues at the practice retired. In November 2021 she temporarily shut down the askMyGP service, and reportedly 70% of patients were managed online and some were receiving insufficient treatment.

The Health Foundation conducted a study of 146 GP practices in England using askmyGP between 1 March 2019 and 30 September 2021 - during the COVID-19 pandemic in the United Kingdom. They analysed 7.5 million patient-initiated requests. There were concerns about the risk of digital tools creating inequalities by making it difficult for some patients to access care but patients often chose remote over face-to-face consultations.

Four GP practices in Bury, Greater Manchester switched off access to the online consultation service in April 2022 because of the significant number of outstanding requests from patients that they had been unable to deal with. James Daly, the local MP, and local residents expressed concern that this would increase attendance at A&E.
