= Diagnostic stewardship =

Optimizing use of medical diagnostic tests

Diagnostic stewardship is an approach to improving patient care by optimizing the use of diagnostic tests. It has been defined as "coordinated guidance and interventions to improve appropriate use of microbiological diagnostics to guide therapeutic decisions". It is commonly characterized as providing the "right test to the right patient at the right time" to inform clinical care. A 2026 WHO definition further emphasizes the "right specimen collection technique" and "testing the sample, and reporting, communicating, interpreting and acting on the results in the right way".

Diagnostic stewardship aims to reduce diagnostic error and improve patient outcomes by addressing inappropriate or unnecessary testing as well as underuse of necessary tests. Both overutilization and underutilization of diagnostic tests can be problematic. Appropriate test selection may take into account factors such as analytical performance, diagnostic yield, local epidemiology, patient characteristics, and pretest probability. The timing of a test is also important when its results need to fit into the clinical workflow and affect patient care.

Diagnostic stewardship encompasses the entire diagnostic-test process, including test ordering, specimen collection and transport, test performance, and the reporting, interpretation, and communication of results. Interventions can therefore occur during the preanalytical, analytical, or postanalytical phases of testing. They may include clinical decision support systems, guidance on test selection and specimen collection, and interventions to improve the interpretation and communication of test results.

Diagnostic stewardship is closely related to laboratory stewardship, but extends beyond laboratory processes into clinical decision-making about the selection, timing, and interpretation of diagnostic tests. It is also complementary to antimicrobial stewardship, particularly in infectious diseases, where appropriate diagnostic testing and interpretation can guide antimicrobial treatment and contribute to efforts to reduce inappropriate antibiotic use and antimicrobial resistance.

== Scope and process ==
Diagnostic stewardship encompasses the diagnostic testing process from the decision to order a test through specimen collection, testing, reporting, and clinical interpretation of results. Interventions may therefore target the preanalytical, analytical, or postanalytical phases. The preanalytical phase includes test selection and ordering, specimen collection, and specimen transport and preparation; the analytical phase includes performance of the test; and the postanalytical phase includes reporting, evaluation, interpretation, and communication of results.

Both overuse and underuse of diagnostic tests can contribute to diagnostic error. Test selection may take into account the clinical question, pretest probability, test performance, diagnostic yield, patient characteristics, and local epidemiology. For example, testing a patient with a low pretest probability can increase the likelihood that a positive result is false, whereas failure to test when clinically indicated can delay diagnosis.

== Interventions and effectiveness ==
Diagnostic stewardship interventions include clinician education, diagnostic algorithms, clinical decision support, electronic test-ordering modifications, changes to test menus and order sets, and guidance on specimen collection. They may also use nudges, best-practice alerts, or soft or hard stops to discourage testing when specified criteria are not met. Other interventions include reflex or selective testing and modifications to the reporting and interpretation of results, such as interpretive comments, selective reporting, and cascade reporting. Electronic ordering systems may use reminders, alerts, default options, or restrictions to discourage low-value testing while facilitating appropriate tests. Programs may also monitor testing rates and other quality indicators and provide feedback to clinicians on their use of diagnostic tests.

Diagnostic stewardship is generally implemented through multidisciplinary teams that may include laboratory professionals, clinicians, nurses, pharmacists, information technology specialists, infection prevention personnel, and other stakeholders. Interventions can be directed at particular tests or diagnostic problems, such as inappropriate blood or urine cultures, respiratory testing, or specimen contamination. The choice of intervention depends on the clinical setting, patient population, diagnostic service, and specific problem being addressed.

Evidence for the effectiveness of diagnostic stewardship interventions is strongest for measures of appropriate test utilization. A review summarized by the Agency for Healthcare Research and Quality found evidence supporting electronic computerized-provider-order-entry modifications and reflex testing, while evidence for some individual interventions, including education, feedback, and test review, was more limited.

When interventions were combined, with many paired with clinician education and feedback, improvement in appropriate test use was supported by evidence. However, there is limited evidence on whether diagnostic stewardship reduces diagnostic errors or improves patient outcomes. Some interventions may also increase clinician workload or affect autonomy.

== Implementation and evaluation ==
Diagnostic stewardship interventions should have defined goals and measures of their effects. Some of the measures used are changes in testing volume, test utilization, turnaround time, patient outcomes, length of hospital stay, and healthcare resource use. Unintended effects and whether changes in testing lead to appropriate clinical action are also evaluated, instead of relying solely on process measures, Laboratory and clinical personnel and other stakeholders who use or are affected by diagnostic testing generally collaborate in its development and implementation.

== International variation ==
The way diagnostic stewardship is implemented depends in part on the healthcare system, laboratory resources, and national policies on antimicrobial resistance. The published evidence has been concentrated in the United States; a 2024 scoping review of 105 studies found that the majority were conducted there, with relatively few studies from other countries.

Reflective testing, in which laboratory professionals may add tests based on their professional judgment, is more commonly described in the United Kingdom and Europe than in the United States. The World Health Organization has developed diagnostic stewardship guidance for settings where microbiological diagnosis is not routinely incorporated into patient management, and has subsequently developed regional guidance for strengthening clinical diagnostic stewardship in the Western Pacific, particularly in low- and middle-income countries.

== Relationship to other forms of stewardship ==
Diagnostic stewardship is closely related to laboratory stewardship, but extends beyond laboratory operations to clinical decisions about whether, when, and how diagnostic tests should be used and interpreted. It is also complementary to antimicrobial stewardship. In infectious diseases, diagnostic testing can provide information used to select, initiate, modify, or discontinue antimicrobial treatment, while antimicrobial stewardship focuses on the appropriate use of antimicrobial therapy.

== See also ==
- Antimicrobial stewardship – Optimizing use of antimicrobials
- Clinical decision support system – Health information technology
- Diagnostic error – Error in the diagnosis of a condition
- Laboratory medicine – Medical specialty using laboratory tests
- Laboratory stewardship – Optimizing use of laboratory tests
- Medical diagnosis – Process to identify a disease or disorder
