= Wendy Levinson =

Canadian physician and academic

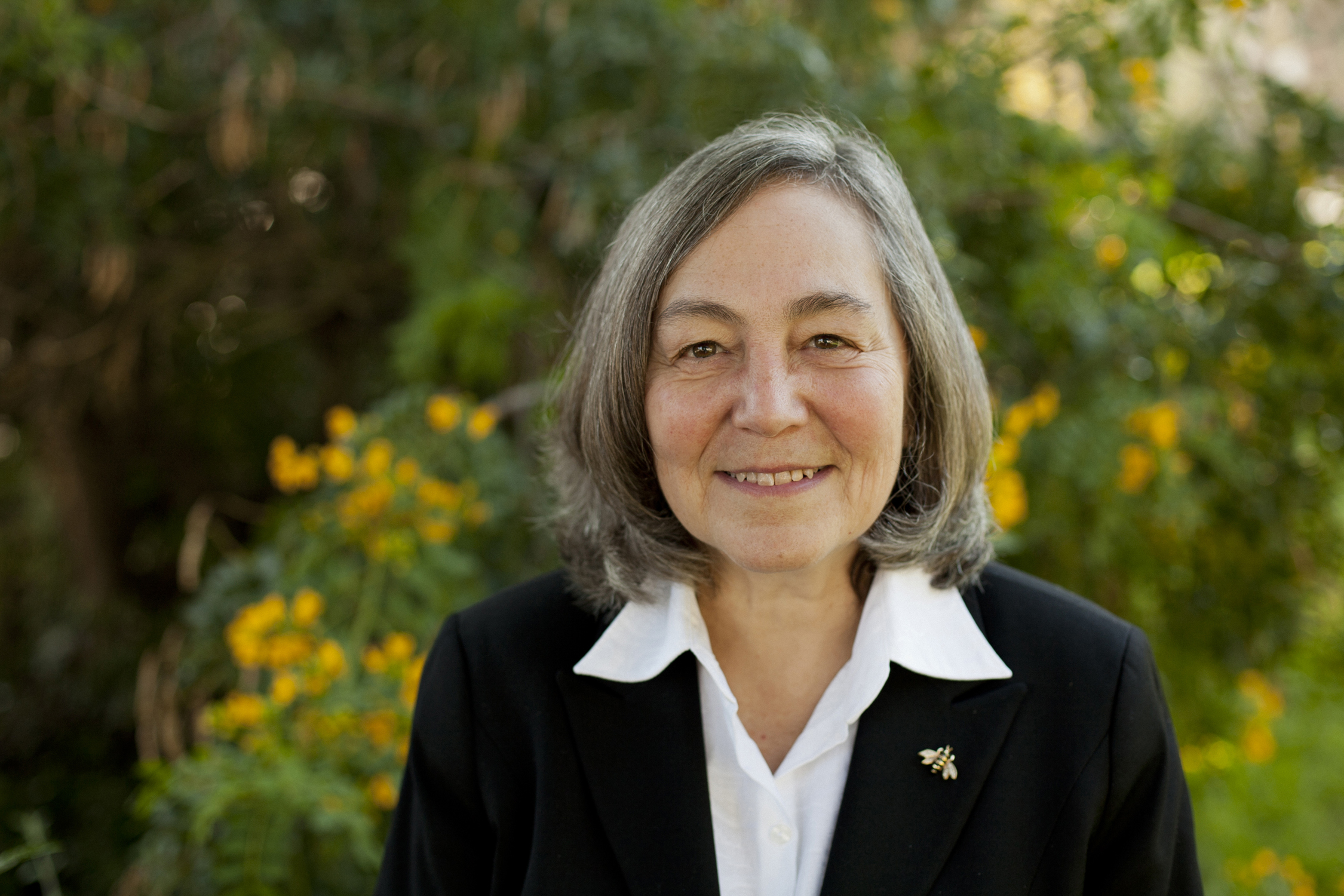
- Dr. Wendy Levinson (MD, OC) Chair of Choosing Wisely Canada
- Born: Toronto, Ontario, Canada
- Education: University of Toronto, McGill University, McMaster University
- Occupation: Physician
- Writing career
- Notable awards: May Cohen award for women mentors

Wendy Levinson MD OC is a Canadian physician and academic. She is the Chair of Choosing Wisely Canada, "a campaign to help physicians and patients engage in conversations about unnecessary tests, treatments and procedures". She is also Professor of Medicine at the University of Toronto.

Born and raised in Toronto, she received a Bachelor of Science degree from the University of Toronto, a Diploma in Education from McGill University, and her MD from McMaster University in 1976. She is the past Sir John and Lady Eaton Professor and Chair of Medicine in the Department of Medicine at the University of Toronto Faculty of Medicine. She is the lead author of Understanding Medical Professionalism as well as co-author of Goldman's Cecil Medicine's, 24th and 25th edition.

== Healthcare Policy ==
Dr. Levinson has worked on healthcare policy reforms in Canada. In 2014, she launched a campaign called Choosing Wisely Canada, a campaign to reduce unnecessary use of health care. Choosing Wisely partnered with the Canadian Institute for Health Information (CIHI) to produce a report, dubbed Unnecessary Care in Canada. At CIHI, researchers focused on eight of the more than 200 recommendations compiled by Levinson's group, and found that over one million unnecessary medical tests are administered every year province by province across Canada. Levinson called the findings the first national picture of unnecessary care. Dr. Levinson said unnecessary care creeps into the health-care system for a slew of reasons and knowing how provinces differ regarding unnecessary tests and treatments is the first step in making improvements.

== Honours ==
In 2013, she was awarded the Canadian Medical Association's May Cohen Award for Women Mentors. In 2014, she was made an Officer of the Order of Canada "for her contributions to promoting effective communication between physicians and patients, as well as for her sustained leadership in academic medicine".
