= Patient blood management =

Set of medical practices

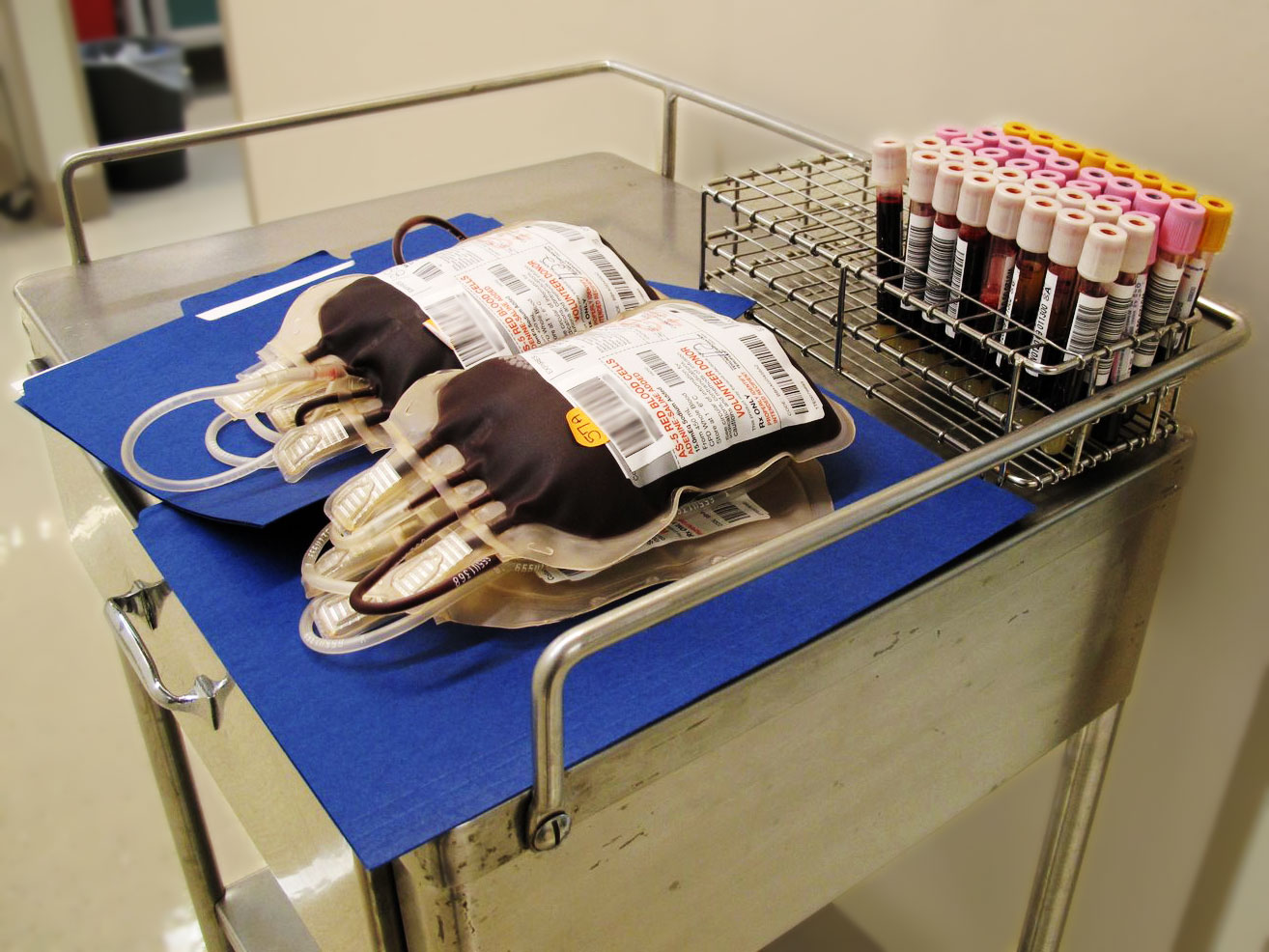
Units of blood collected during the 69th ADA Blood Drive at the Robertson Blood Center at Fort Hood, Texas on September 18, 2009

Patient Blood Management (PBM) is a set of medical practices designed to optimise the care of patients who might need a blood transfusion. Patient blood management programs use an organized framework to improve blood health, thus increasing patient safety and quality of life, reducing costs, and improving clinical outcomes. Some strategies to accomplish this include ensuring that anemia is treated prior to a surgical operation, using surgical techniques that limit blood loss, and returning blood lost during surgery to the patient via intraoperative blood salvage.

Patient blood management represents an international initiative in best practice for patient centered care that is supported by the World Health Organization (WHO). Patient blood management is about enhancing a patient's own blood health by managing anemia, optimizing coagulation, and using blood conservation strategies. Examples of how to implement PBM are available from Australia, the UK, and the US.

== History ==
The term "Patient Blood Management" was first used in 2005 by Professor James Isbister, an Australian hematologist, who believed that the focus of transfusion medicine should shift from the blood component to the patient.

During a session of the World Health Assembly in 2010, the resolution WHA63.12 was adopted, which included recommendations on the safety and availability of blood components. PBM initially consisted of pharmacological and non-pharmacological techniques, to be adopted before, during, and after surgery, to prevent the patient from arriving in the operating room in a condition of anemia.

== Medical uses ==
Patient Blood Management is an approach that can be implemented in hospital settings for taking care of people who require blood transfusions. PBM includes techniques that may help ensure each person receiving a blood transfusion receives optimal treatment for their condition and also ensures that the blood supply (bank of donated blood) is maintained to ensure that all people who require blood components in the hospital have them available at the time that they would benefit from them.

Patient Blood Management can be beneficial in surgical settings and in non-surgical settings with the goal of reducing the risk of needing a blood transfusion and improving the outcome for those who require a blood transfusion.

== Technique ==
Three pillars of patient blood management:

1. Detect and treat anemia.
2. Prevent or minimize blood loss.
3. Enhance patient's physiological reserve to tolerate anemia.

The cornerstone of patient blood management is a multidisciplinary approach, involving family physicians, nurses, anesthetists, surgeons, Transfusion Practitioners, hematologists, and hematology and blood transfusion laboratory staff. Part of PBM is avoiding unnecessary treatments and procedures, and some of the PBM recommendations from around the world have been incorporated in to the "Choosing Wisely" campaigns that exist in Australia, Canada, the UK, and the US.

A challenge lies in identifying those patients who are at risk of complications of severe anemia (ischemia) and transfusing them, without exposing other patients to unwarranted risks of inappropriate transfusions.

=== Surgical settings ===
Patient blood management in the perioperative setting can be achieved by means of a variety of techniques and strategies. First, ensuring that the patient enters the operating room with a sufficient hematocrit level is essential. Preoperative anemia has been documented to range from 5% in female geriatric hip fracture patients to over 75% in colon cancer patients. Patients who are anemic prior to surgery often require more transfusions. Erythropoietin and iron therapy can be considered in cases of anemia. Accordingly, patients should be screened for anemia at least 30 days prior to an elective surgical procedure. Although either oral or parenteral iron could be given, increasingly clinicians are giving parenteral iron to ensure that the haemoglobin is increased the maximal amount before the elective surgery is undertaken.

During surgery, techniques are utilized to reduce or eliminate exposure to allogeneic blood. For example, electrocautery, which is a technique utilized for surgical dissection, removal of soft tissue and sealing blood vessels, can be applied to a variety of procedures. During surgical procedures that are expected to have significant blood loss, blood that is lost during surgery can be collected, filtered, washed and given back to the patient. This procedure is known as intraoperative blood salvage. Pharmacologic agents, for example tranexamic acid, can also be utilized to minimize blood loss. Another technique, acute normovolemic hemodilution, involves the collection of a selected calculated volume of the patient's own blood in collection bags prior to the start of surgery with the simultaneous replacement of an equal volume of non-blood fluid. Since the patient's blood is now diluted, blood lost during the surgical procedure, i.e. by hemorrhage, contains smaller amounts of red blood cells. The collected blood product, which contains red blood cells, platelets and coagulation factors, is reinfused at the end of the surgery. People who are in good health and not anemic may sometimes donate their own blood prior to the surgery (autologous blood donation), which helps to conserve donor units and reduces some of the risks of exposure to allogeneic blood (though autologous donation carries risks of its own). When all of these therapies are combined, blood loss is greatly reduced which correspondingly reduces or averts the potential for allogeneic blood transfusion. Additional details on this question can be found in the journal, Transfusion.

Exposure to blood can be reduced, and tolerance to anemia enhanced, by using a "restrictive" transfusion strategy; for example, the AABB recommends that hospital patients in stable condition only be transfused when the hemoglobin drops below 7–8 g/dL (70–80 g/L). A maximum surgical blood order schedule (MSBOS), which lists the number of blood units typically required for a given surgical operation, can also be used to help prevent unnecessary blood orders.

=== Information technology in PBM ===
Information technology can be useful in implementing a patient blood management policy, this includes:

- Daily e-mails alerting physicians of transfusions that have occurred outside of the local guidelines
- Computerized physician order entry systems that automatically create an alert when the transfusion order is inconsistent with the reason selected for transfusion and the laboratory hemoglobin level
- Audit and feedback, an approach which generates a summary of the clinical performance of healthcare providers over a specified period of time, for follow-up by hospital-based experts who discuss best practices with participating clinicians
- Improved management of blood components, leading to decreased wastage

=== Non surgical settings ===
Using Patient Blood Management techniques in non-surgical settings may also be helpful for reducing the need for blood transfusions and improving a person's outcome. Examples include, identifying any anemia in people with advanced end-stage liver disease and determining of the cause of this anemia can be reversed. Early identification and correction of anemia in pregnant women may also reduce the need for blood transfusions.

== Risks and complications ==
Patient blood management is often implemented in order to improve patient outcomes. Published in 2017, a retrospective observational study in four major adult tertiary-care hospitals concluded that implementation of a unique, jurisdiction-wide PBM program was associated with improved patient outcomes, reduced blood product utilization, and product-related cost savings.

Better outcomes are achieved with the reduction or avoidance of exposure to allogeneic blood. Numerous clinical studies have shown that allogeneic blood transfusions are associated with increased mortality and an increased level of serious complications, while potentially exposing the patient to viral, bacterial, or parasitic agents. Also, current medical literature shows that in most circumstances a restrictive threshold is as safe as a more liberal red cell transfusion threshold and in certain circumstances, for example gastrointestinal bleeding due to liver disease, a more liberal red cell transfusion strategy may be harmful.

== Society and culture ==
=== Cost ===
Allogeneic blood transfusion is extremely expensive. For example, some studies reported increased costs of $300–$1,000 per unit of allogeneic blood transfused. The more blood that is transfused directly impacts hospital expenditures, and it behooves administrators to search for ways to reduce this cost. This increasing cost of transfusions is the reason many hospital administrators are endeavoring to establish blood management programs.

== See also ==
- Autotransfusion
- Bloodless surgery
