= Serious Hazards of Transfusion =

Serious Hazards of Transfusion (SHOT) is the United Kingdom's haemovigilance scheme.

It collects and analyses anonymized information on adverse events and blood transfusion reactions. When SHOT has identified risks related to transfusion, it produces recommendations within its annual reports to improve patient safety. These reports are freely available on its website.

SHOT, together with the Medicines and Healthcare products Regulatory Agency (MHRA), works to support haemovigilance reporting in the UK.

== Results ==
SHOT's statistical data has been used to decrease bacterial infections through better skin cleansing procedures and the incidence of life-threatening transfusion-related acute lung injury (TRALI) in the UK, by discouraging the use of fresh frozen plasma from female donors. The cause of TRALI is not fully understood, and may have more than one mechanism, but most cases are associated with transfusion of plasma or other blood products that contain some antibodies that the donor developed during pregnancy. Not using plasma donation from female donors for transfusions eliminates the risk of exposing the recipient to pregnancy-related antibodies, and therefore reduces the risk of TRALI. The collected information has also provided evidence to support the pre-existing practice of leukodepletion (depleting the number of leukocytes, or white blood cells, from the product) to reduce the risk of transfusion-associated graft-versus-host disease and post-transfusion purpura in immunocompromised patients.

SHOT's data has also focused attention on human errors, with the result that staff training and procedures have been improved. For example, SHOT's data demonstrated that increasing the use of wristbands for patient identification and portable, bedside barcode readers reduced the risk of an error caused by human factors.

== History ==
SHOT was established in 1996. During the first ten years, it collected more than 2,000 confidential reports about transfusion safety problems or near misses. During the first two years of voluntary reports, about half of these errors involved giving the wrong type of blood or blood component to a patient. This happens, for example, if hospital staff accidentally take the wrong item out of the blood bank refrigerator. Less than 1% of errors resulted in an infection.

By 2012, almost all NHS hospitals, trusts, and health boards had registered with SHOT and were submitting reports. Participation is now mandatory.

The "Better Blood Transfusion" strategy by the UK's Department of Health was based on evidence collected by SHOT.
