= Choosing Wisely =

U.S.-based educational campaign

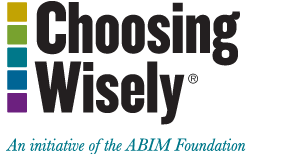
Logo for the campaign

Choosing Wisely is a United States–based health educational campaign, led by the ABIM Foundation (American Board of Internal Medicine), about unnecessary health care.

The campaign identifies over 500 tests and procedures and encourages doctors and patients to discuss, research, and possibly get second opinions, before proceeding with them. To conduct the campaign, the ABIM Foundation asks medical specialty societies to make five to ten recommendations for preventing overuse of a treatment in their field. The foundation then publicizes this information, and the medical specialty societies disseminate it to their members.

The campaign has garnered both praise and criticism, and some of its ideas have spread to other countries. It does not include evaluation of its effects on costs, on discussions or on medical outcomes. Some doctors have said they lack time for the recommended discussions.

== History ==
Christine K. Cassel of Choosing Wisely explains the campaign, 2 August 2012

In 2002 the ABIM Foundation published Medical professionalism in the new millennium: a Physician Charter. The charter states that physicians have a responsibility to promote health equity when some health resources are scarce. As a practical way of achieving distributive justice, in 2010 physician Howard Brody recommended that medical specialty societies, being stewards of a field, ought to publish a list of five things which they would like changed in their field and publicize it to their members. In 2011, the National Physicians Alliance tested a project in which it organized the creation of some "top 5 lists". Analysis of the National Physician's Alliance project predicted that the health field could have saved US$6.8 billion in 2009 by cutting spending on the 15 services in the lists from three societies, out of total US health spending that year of US$2.5 trillion. US$5.8 billion of the savings were from one recommendation: using generic rather than brand name statin.

Continuing this project, Choosing Wisely was created to organise the creation of more "lists of five," later ten, and their distribution to more physicians and patients. Executive boards of societies, with or without participation by members, identify practices which their field may overuse. Each recommendation in the program must have the support of clinical guidelines, evidence, or expert opinion.

To participate in Choosing Wisely, each society developed list of tests, treatments, or services which that specialty commonly overuses. The society shares this information with their members, as well as organizations who can publicize to local community groups, and in each community patients and doctors can consider the information as they like. The ABIM Foundation gave grants to help societies participate.

As of April 2018, there were 552 recommendations targeting a range of procedures to either question or avoid without special consideration. They can be searched online by key words, such as "back pain" but the numerous supporting footnotes on each recommendation are only in a pdf on the clinician page, without links to the papers.

Between 2012 and 2023, more than 80 specialty societies highlighted examples. While these examples are no longer maintained and available on the website (www.choosingwisely.org), specialty societies are encouraged to publish individual lists. Many of these lists are accessible through https://www.aafp.org/pubs/afp/collections/choosing-wisely.html.

=== Examples ===
Some examples of the information shared in Choosing Wisely include the following:

- Acknowledge that physicians are increasing their use of diagnostic procedures without a proportional increase in patient benefits (improved outcomes). Consider the effects of overuse of diagnostic services.
- Physicians overuse radiography services. In many cases this fails to improve patient outcomes. This also subjects patients to unnecessary ionizing radiation and the possibility of further unnecessary testing.
- Before the 39th week of pregnancy, doctors should not perform a Caesarean section or induce labor unless medically necessary.

== Challenges ==
The Choosing Wisely campaign identifies the following difficulties in achieving its goals:

- In communicating with patients a major challenge in the campaign is the problem inherent in patient-centered care of giving patients some basis for understanding how to make decisions about their health care. Many recommendations in the campaign require clinical education to understand fully. Also many patients tend to follow the recommendations of their physicians without question, even if they have questions.
- The United States medical system is based on a fee-for-service model, in which doctors are paid on the basis of work they do, so they are paid for procedures they do, though not tests or procedures which they refer to others. This system creates incentives for doctors to provide additional treatments, rather than exercising evidence-based restraint.
- Critics tend to view efforts to reduce medical services as "healthcare rationing in the United States". Since doctors do not want to be seen as withholding care, they are hesitant to change established behavior in any way that lessens the amount of treatment they order. Doctors say that they often feel pressure to engage in defensive medicine by conducting extra testing to avoid lawsuits.
- The motives of professional societies with Choosing Wisely lists has been questioned, as societies avoid targeting low-value care that generates income for their members, and instead target the practice of other health professionals.

== Reception ==
The American College of Emergency Physicians (ACEP) initially formed three independent task forces to evaluate whether to participate; by 2012 all three task forces recommended against participation because the recommendations do not recognize that emergency physicians need extra tests, since they do not know the patients, do not recognize that emergency physicians need to eliminate every life-threatening possibility, will lead to refusals by insurers to cover items on the lists, let other medical societies tell emergency physicians what to do, and because the campaign does not address tort reform to address defensive testing, and the campaign publicizes the items as "unnecessary tests" even though describing them as tests to discuss carefully.

In 2012 The New York Times said that the campaign was likely to "alter treatment standards in hospitals and doctors' offices nationwide" and one of their opinion writers said that many tests were unnecessary. CBS News said that "the evidence is on the initiative's side." USA Today noted that the campaign was "a rare coordinated effort among multiple medical societies".

While expressing the need for evidence-based healthcare recommendations, in 2012 The Economist found the Choosing Wisely recommendations to be weak because they are not enforceable. In an editorial published in the Southwest Journal of Pulmonary and Critical Care, Richard Robbin and Allen Thomas expressed concern that the campaign could be used by payers to limit options for doctors and patients. However, they declare the Choosing Wisely recommendations a "welcome start."

Also in 2012, Robert Goldberg, writing for The American Spectator, criticized the program saying that it was "designed to sustain the rationale and ideology that shaped Obamacare" (the Patient Protection and Affordable Care Act), that the lists were "redundant and highly subjective", and that participants in the effort would greedily benefit at the expense of others if the campaign succeeded.

In February 2013 the Robert Wood Johnson Foundation provided US$2.5 million in funding for the campaign, saying that the foundation wanted to "help increase the tangible impact of the Choosing Wisely campaign".

A 2013 editorial in the journal of the Netherlands Society of Cardiology reviewed the recommendations and recommended that something similar be proposed by the society; the piece did criticize the overly didactic nature of the recommendations, comparing them to the Ten Commandments, and expressed concern about whether they adequately addressed the difficulties of assessing risks for each patient. In 2013 critics in the Southwest Journal of Pulmonary & Critical Care said, "the present Choosing Wisely campaign has fundamental flaws—not because it is medically wrong but because it attempts to replace choice and good judgment with a rigid set of rules that undoubtedly will have many exceptions. Based on what we have seen so far, we suspect that Choosing Wisely is much more about saving money than improving patient care. We also predict it will be used by the unknowing or unscrupulous to further interfere with the doctor-patient relationship."

In 2015 the campaign was criticized by Bob Lanier, executive director of a medical specialty society and past president of the Texas Medical Association Foundation, who said that the recommendations were compiled by societies' executive committees without good evidence and without following standards of practice or research, will lead to refusals by insurers to cover items on the lists, are biased against diagnostic testing, are an effort by supporters of single-payer healthcare to reduce costs so that single-payer healthcare becomes affordable, will encourage biased studies by authors funded by insurers and health delivery systems, to cut their costs, and were influenced by grants available from the ABIM Foundation.

In 2015 a piece in Newsweek by Kurt Eichenwald described a controversy around the ABIM Foundation's lack of transparency about its finances and functioning.

In 2016 campaign was described as an attempt to encourage doctors and patients to recognize the illusion of control or "therapeutic illusion" in choices to use treatments which have a basis outside of evidence-based medicine.

In 2017 addiction specialists in Canada said the recommendation to wait for sobriety before treating depression was harmful and unjustified.

A 2017 study reported that many patients and physicians found it challenging to use Choosing Wisely recommendations, particularly when the patient had symptoms, and the doctor recommended against a test. Barriers "included malpractice concern, patient requests for services, lack of time for shared decision making, and the number of tests recommended by specialists. Cedars–Sinai Medical Center in Los Angeles put 100 of the 552 Choosing Wisely items in its electronic medical records. These give warnings to doctors, but only after they have finished talking to patients and order a procedure or drug, so too late to have the recommended discussion.

== Impact ==
The Choosing Wisely campaign makes no provision to scientifically research its own efficacy, but academic centers are making plans to independently report on the impact of the campaign. The services targeted by the Choosing Wisely lists have broad variance in how much impact they can have on patients' care and costs. Doctors analyzed many services listed as low value by Choosing Wisely and other sources, and found that 25% or 42% of Medicare patients received at least one of these services in an average year, depending on definitions. The services represented 0.6% or 2.7% of Medicare costs and there was no significant pattern among types of physicians.

The campaign has been cited as being part of a broader movement including many comparable campaigns. The German Network for Evidence Based Medicine considered adapting concepts from the program into the German healthcare system. In April 2014, Choosing Wisely Canada launched. Choosing Wisely Canada is organized by the Canadian Medical Association and the University of Toronto, and is chaired by Dr. Wendy Levinson. By 2015 and following the Choosing Wisely precedent established in the United States, doctors in Australia, Canada, Denmark, England, France, Germany, Italy, Japan, the Netherlands, New Zealand, Switzerland, and Wales were exploring whether and how to bring ideas from Choosing Wisely to their countries. English doctors "are worried how patients will perceive the initiative." In 2018, Norway launched Gjør kloke valg (lit. 'Make smart choices') modeled on the Choosing Wisely program.
