= Stewardship theory =

Theory of management and political leadership

Stewardship theory is a theory that managers, left on their own, will act as responsible stewards of the assets and resources they control. Stewardship theorists assume that given a choice between self-serving behavior and pro-organizational behavior, a steward will place higher value on cooperation than defection. Stewards are assumed to be collectivists, pro-organizational, and trustworthy.

In American politics, an example of the stewardship theory is where a president practices a governing style based on belief they have the duty to do whatever is necessary in national interest, unless prohibited by the U.S. Constitution. The stewardship approach is often associated with Theodore Roosevelt, who viewed the presidency as a "bully pulpit" of moral and political leadership.
