= Antimicrobial stewardship =

Optimizing use of antimicrobials

Antimicrobial stewardship (AMS) refers to coordinated efforts to promote the optimal use of antimicrobial agents, including drug choice, dose, route of administration, and duration of therapy.

Every time an antimicrobial agent is used, whether or not that use is justified, it applies selective evolutionary pressure to microbial populations which can result in acquired antimicrobial resistance. Antimicrobial resistance genes can then spread to other microbes in the host or their environment, including those organisms that can live on your skin or in your body where they coexist with the host. Antimicrobial use can also cause additional unintended consequences, such as disruption to the normal microbiome (i.e., dysbiosis) as well as direct toxic effects on people and animals, including damage to kidneys, liver, teeth and bones. These unintended consequences are often referred to as "collateral damage". Antimicrobial therapy is justified when the benefits outweigh these risks.

== Definition and goals ==
In 2007, the Society for Healthcare Epidemiology of America (SHEA) defined AMS as a set of coordinated strategies to improve the use of antimicrobial medications with the goal to:

- enhance patient health outcomes
- reduce antibiotic resistance, and
- decrease unnecessary costs
- reduce/eliminate any unnecessary applications of antimicrobials, i.e. to stem antimicrobial overuse, e.g., giving antibacterial drugs for viral infections
- ensure that human and animal patients who need antimicrobials receive the optimal drug for them, at the correct time, at an effective dose, via the correct route, for the minimum effective duration
- minimize environmental contamination with antimicrobial agents

Decreasing the overuse of antimicrobials is expected to serve the following goals:

- improve patient outcomes, especially patient safety
- decrease adverse drug reactions such as hypersensitivity reactions or kidney or heart damage (e.g., QT prolongation)
- decrease antibiotic-associated disease, such as Clostridioides difficile–associated diarrhea, other antibiotic-associated diarrhea, and invasive candidiasis
- guard the patient's microbiome, including the gut flora, respiratory tract flora, urogenital tract flora, and skin flora (this is closely related to the preceding goal of preventing antibiotic-associated disease)
- decrease wasted costs
- slow the increase in antimicrobial resistance
- prevent unforeseen environmental degradation, such as likely adverse effects of altering biotas and animal microbiotas by pervading the water cycle with antimicrobials in wastewater

== History ==
Antimicrobial misuse was recognized as early as the 1940s, when Alexander Fleming remarked on penicillin's decreasing efficacy, because of its overuse. However, the first systematic assessment of antibiotic use wasn't published until 1966 from a study that took place at Winnipeg General Hospital in Manitoba, Canada. Two years later, in 1968, others estimated that 50% of antimicrobial use was either unnecessary or inappropriate. In the 1970s, the first clinical pharmacy services were established in North American hospitals.

1980s

The first formal evaluation of antibiotic use in children was undertaken at The Children's Hospital of Winnipeg in 1980. Researchers observed errors in 30% of medical orders and 63% of surgical orders. The most frequent error was unnecessary treatment found in 13% of medical and 45% of surgical orders. The authors stated "Many find it difficult to accept that there are standards against which therapy may be judged."

In the 1980s, the antibiotic class of cephalosporins was introduced, further increasing bacterial resistance. During this decade, infection control programs began to be established in hospitals, which systematically recorded and investigated hospital-acquired infections. Evidence-based treatment guidelines and regulation of antibiotic use surfaced.

1990s

The term "antimicrobial stewardship" was coined in 1996 by two US internists at Emory University School of Medicine, John McGowan Jr., MD and Dale N. Gerding, MD. They suggested there be "...large-scale, well-controlled trials of antimicrobial use regulation employing sophisticated epidemiologic methods, molecular biological organism typing, and precise resistance mechanism analysis to determine the best methods to prevent and control this problem [antimicrobial resistance] and ensure our optimal antimicrobial use stewardship" and that "...the long-term effects of antimicrobial selection, dosage, and duration of treatment on resistance development should be a part of every antimicrobial treatment decision."

In 1997, SHEA and the Infectious Diseases Society of America published guidelines to prevent antimicrobial resistance arguing that "…appropriate antimicrobial stewardship, that includes optimal selection, dose, and duration of treatment, as well as control of antibiotic use, will prevent or slow the emergence of resistance among microorganisms."

2000s

Years later, bacterial, viral and fungal resistance had risen to such a degree that the U.S.Centers for Disease Control and Prevention rang the alarm. In 2007, IDSA and SHEA published guidelines for developing an AMS program. That same year, the first pediatric publication used the term AMS.

A survey of pediatric infectious disease (ID) consultants in 2008 by the Emerging Infectious Disease Network revealed that only 45 (33%) respondents had an AMS program (ASP), mostly from before 2000, and another 25 (18%) planned an ASP (data unpublished).

2010s

In 2012, the SHEA, IDSA and the Pediatric Infectious Diseases Society (PIDS) published a joint policy statement on AMS.

On September 18, 2014, President Barack Obama issued an Executive Order 13676, "Combating Antibiotic-Resistant Bacteria.' This Executive Order charged a Task Force to develop a 5-year action plan that included steps to reduce the emergence and spread of antibiotic-resistant bacteria and ensure continued availability of effective therapies for infections. Improved AMS is one of the charges of this Executive Order. The Presidential Advisory Council on Combating Antibiotic-Resistant Bacteria (PACCARB) was formed in response to this Executive Order.

In 2014, the CDC recommended, that all US hospitals have an antibiotic stewardship program (ASP) and released the first iteration of the CDC Core Elements of Antibiotic Stewardship which outline key components of an ASP.

On January 1, 2017, Joint Commission regulations went into effect detailing that hospitals should have an AMS team consisting of infection preventionist(s), pharmacist(s), and a practitioner to write protocols and develop projects focused on the appropriate use of antibiotics. In 2018, a survey of AMS programs in the US showed each 0.50 increase in pharmacist and physician full-time equivalent (FTE) support predicted a roughly 1.5-fold increase in the program's effectiveness, but in a 2019 survey 45% of responding physicians reported that their institution provided no support for their ASP services.

As of 2019, California and Missouri had made AMS programs mandatory by law.

=== 2020´s ===
Effective January 1, 2020, the Joint Commission antimicrobial stewardship requirements were expanded to outpatient health care organizations as well.

In July, 2022 the Centers for Medicare & Medicaid Services (CMS) published their Infection Prevention and Control and Antibiotic Stewardship Program Interpretive Guidance update, which emphasizes that ASPs must document evidence-based antibiotic use in all departments of the hospital, including improvements in antimicrobial use. They also require programs to adhere to national guidelines, such as the CDC core elements, and guidelines set forth by organizations including but not limited to the Society for Healthcare Epidemiology of America (SHEA, IDSA), the American Society of Health-System Pharmacists (ASHP) and the Society for Infectious Disease Pharmacists (SIDP).

=== 2020s and pandemic resilience ===
The COVID-19 pandemic exposed significant weaknesses in antimicrobial stewardship systems, particularly increased precautionary antibiotic prescribing during viral infections. In response to the UK Parliament's 2025 Public Accounts Committee inquiry on antimicrobial resistance, a crisis-resilient antimicrobial stewardship framework was proposed, structured around five interconnected pillars: digital innovation and diagnostics, One Health and environmental governance, workforce resilience and training, surveillance and data integration, and governance and policy alignment. This framework was designed to maintain stewardship effectiveness during both stable conditions and health emergencies, with explicit alignment to WHO GLASS, CDC Core Elements, and the UK AMR National Action Plan 2024–2029.

== Settings ==
Antimicrobial stewardship programs (ASPs) are needed wherever antimicrobials are used. Historically, the focus of ASPs has been on antimicrobials prescribed to humans in acute-care hospitals. In the U.S., within the context of physicians' prescribing freedom (choice of prescription drugs), AMS had largely been voluntary self-regulation in the form of policies and appeals to adhere to a prescribing self-discipline until 2017, when the Joint Commission determined that hospitals should have an AMS team, which was expanded to the outpatient setting in 2020.

Subsequently, AMS efforts have become increasingly common in every setting where antimicrobials are used, such as outpatient clinics and long-term care facilities, including nursing homes, skilled nursing facilities, hospice settings, dental offices, and veterinary clinics.

Organizations such as the World Health Organization (WHO), the World Organisation for Animal Health, the One Health global interdisciplinary collaboration, the US Centers for Disease Control and Prevention (CDC), SIDP, and the Minnesota Department of Health have advocated for a One Health approach to AMS. This approach recognizes that humans, animals, and their shared environment are interconnected; thus, One Health AMS efforts require collaboration across multiple disciplines.

== Participants ==
AMS requires a multidisciplinary team of specialists working together to achieve a common goal including Infectious diseases (ID) physicians who practice adult or pediatric medicine, ID pharmacists, the public health community and their respective professional organizations since the late 1990s. At a hospital, AMS can be organized in the form of an AMS committee that meets monthly. The day-to-day work is done by a core group, usually an ID physician, who may or may not serve in hospital epidemiology and infection control, and/or an ID or antimicrobial stewardship certified pharmacist, ideally but rarely aided by an information technologist. Often, ID pharmacists are completing most of the day-to-day work with physician support. In most cases, the ID physician and pharmacist co-chair the AMS committee. The entire committee may include physician representatives, who are top antimicrobial prescribers such as physicians in intensive care medicine, Hematology -oncology, and cystic fibrosis, hospitalists, a microbiologist, a quality improvement (QI) specialist, and a representative from hospital administration. Leadership commitment from hospital executives is considered a core element of antimicrobial stewardship programs. Involvement from physician, nursing, and pharmacy leadership allow for a program reporting structure that can improve resource availability and sustainability of the program. Six ID organizations, SHEA, IDSA, MAD-ID, National Foundation for Infectious Diseases, PIDS, and SIDP, published joint guidance for the knowledge and skills required for antimicrobial stewardship leaders.

Guidelines for prudent or judicious use in veterinary medicine have been developed by the Canadian Veterinary Medicine Association in 2008. A particular problem is that veterinarians are both prescribers and dispensers. As of 2012, regulators and the Federation of Veterinarians of Europe had been discussing the separation of these activities.

Although AMS interventions often focus on prescribers, the general public also has an important role to play in AMS, in ensuring they always use and dispose of antimicrobials wisely.

== Program components ==
In the US, the CDC recommends essential components of ASPs for acute care hospitals, small and critical access hospitals, resource-limited facilities, long-term care facilities, and outpatient facilities.

As of 2014, thirteen internet-based institutional ASP resources in US academic medical centers had been published. An ASP has the following tasks, in line with quality improvement theory:

=== Baseline assessment ===
Parts of the baseline assessment are to:

- Measure baseline antimicrobial use, dosing, duration, costs and use patterns.
- Study type of microbial isolates, susceptibilities, and trends thereof
- Identify clinician indication for prescriptions.

In hospitals and clinics using electronic medical records, information technology resources are crucial to focusing on these questions. As of 2015, commercial computer surveillance software programs for microbiology and antimicrobial administrations appear to outnumber "homegrown" institutional programs, and include, but are not limited to TREAT StewardTM, TheraDoc, Sentri7, and Vigilanz.

=== Goals of desirable antimicrobial use ===
For the desired antimicrobial use, goals need to be formulated:

- Define "appropriate", rational antimicrobial use for the institution, individual patient units, and define empiric treatment versus culture-directed antimicrobial treatment.[12]
- Establish treatment guidelines for clinical syndromes. These can be disseminated in the form of memos, in-services or grand rounds and may be most effective in the form of decision-making tools at the point of ordering the prescription.

=== Interventions on antimicrobial prescribing ===
The actual interventions on antimicrobial prescribing consist of numerous elements

=== Provide feedback, continuing education ===
- Survey prescriber knowledge about antibiotics, antifungal or antiviral drugs.
- Provide targeted education about particular antibiotics, or one specific antimicrobial at a time, as well as empiric treatment for syndromes versus culture directed treatment.
- Assist in making duration more visible to prescribers. Some institutions use automatic stop orders.
- Decreasing diagnostic uncertainty by appropriate testing, including rapid diagnostic methods. The most effective strategy to decrease diagnostic uncertainty would be to align the focus with other safety projects, and QI measures (e.g. blood management, adverse effects etc.).

Biomerieux has published case studies of countries that introduced AMS.

== Interventions ==
The day-to-day work of the core AMS members is to screen patients' medical records in a prospective audit for some of the following questions, in order of importance:

- Are the antimicrobials appropriate based on susceptibility?
- Is the dose and interval of the antimicrobials appropriate based on age, weight, renal function, and drug-drug interaction?
- Is the dose and interval appropriate?
- Was there appropriate deescalation of antimicrobials after culture updates and final results?
- Is the administrate route appropriate and what is the feasibility of drug conversion from intravenous to by mouth?

If the answer is no, the team needs to effectively communicate a recommendation, which may be in person or in the medical record.

Further tasks may include

- Automatic review of the medical record after 72h empiric use, culture results, other laboratory data
- Advise on appropriate duration of antimicrobial therapy
- Annual report to administration, calculation of cost savings if any
- Stewardship program approval of high cost or toxic antimicrobials
- Development of facility wide guidelines for treating common infections
- Creation of hospital antibiograms, which show rates of antibiotic resistance for various bacteria or fungi and can be helpful in selecting antibiotics
  - Open-source packages such as the AMR package for R can automate the creation and standardisation of institutional antibiograms from routine susceptibility data
  - The Weighted-Incidence Syndromic Combination Antibiogram (WISCA) extends the antibiogram concept by producing syndrome-level coverage estimates for empirical regimens, accounting for local pathogen incidence and statistical uncertainty

== Outcomes to measure ==
In 2010, two pediatric ID physicians suggested to look at the following variables to judge the outcome of AMS interventions:

- Annual pharmacy acquisition costs
- Antibiotic days/1,000 patient days
- Identifying "drug-bug mismatches"
- IV to oral conversion
- Optimal dosing
- Stopping redundant therapy
- Reducing adverse events
- Overall compliance with ASP recommendations

When examining the relationship between an outcome and an intervention, the epidemiological method of time series analysis is preferred, because it accounts for the dependence between time points. A review of 825 studies evaluating any AMS intervention in a community or hospital setting revealed a low overall quality of antimicrobial stewardship studies, most not reporting clinical and microbiological outcome data. A 2014 global stewardship survey identified barriers to the initiation, development and implementation of stewardship programs internationally.

== Controversies ==
At this time the optimal metrics to benchmark antimicrobial use are still controversial:

- To measure units of antimicrobials consumed, one can use 'Days Of Therapy' (DOT) or Defined Daily Dose (DDD). The former is more commonly used in the US, the latter is more commonly used in Europe. The 2016 IDSA/SHEA guidelines recommend the use of DOT.
- Data source for antimicrobial use: Where available, the electronic Medication Administration Record (eMAR) is the most accurate correlate for doses given, but it may be difficult to analyze, because of hold orders and patient refusal, as opposed to administrative data or pharmacy billing data, which may be easier to obtain.
- The question of "appropriateness of use" is probably the most controversial. Appropriate use depends on the local antimicrobial resistance profile and therefore has different regional answers. Merely the "amount" of antibiotics used is no straightforward metric for appropriateness.
- In regard to the most effective AMS intervention, the answer will depend on the size of the institution and the resources available: The system of "prior approval" of antimicrobials by ID or pharmacology consultants has been used first historically. It is very time- and labor-intensive, and prescribers do not like its restrictive character. Increasingly, "post-prescription review" is used.
- It can be difficult to decide if a clinical syndrome or a particular drug should be targeted for interventions and education.

How to best modify prescriber behavior has been the subject of controversy and research. At issue is how feedback is presented to prescribers, individually, in aggregate, with or without peer comparisons, and whether to reward or punish. As long as the best quality metrics for an AMS program are unknown, a combination of antimicrobial consumption, antimicrobial resistance, and antimicrobial and drug resistant organism related mortality are used.

- Although education consistently shows improvement in participants' knowledge and attitudes, the results do not always translate to better AMS practice.[32]
- Interventions, particularly in the outpatient setting, should address prescriber concerns about perceived patient value and fear of repercussions from denying antibiotics. Differences in communication strategies between clinicians and patients (e.g. patient expecting antibiotics) can lead to misunderstandings and contribute to unnecessary prescribing of antibiotics.
- Critics have argued that unintended consequences of antimicrobial stewardship programs may include disagreement of ID specialists with colleagues, jeopardizing provider autonomy and provider efficiency.[18] However, proponents argue that antimicrobial stewardship programs can increase confidence and enhance clinical reasoning to prescribe antimicrobials optimally.

== See also ==
- Diagnostic stewardship – coordinated efforts to promote the appropriate and optimal use of diagnostic testing to improve patient care.
