= American Board of Internal Medicine =

American medical certification board

- Abbreviation: ABIM
- Founded: 1936; 90 years ago
- Founders: American Medical Association, American College of Physicians
- Tax ID no.: 39-0866228
- Legal status: 501(c)(3) nonprofit organization
- Purpose: To enhance the quality of health care by certifying internists and subspecialists who demonstrate the knowledge, skills and attitudes essential for excellent patient care.
- Headquarters: 510 Walnut Street, Suite 1700, Philadelphia, Pennsylvania 19106, U.S.
- Coordinates: 39.947509°N 75.150470°W
- Chair, Board of Directors: Rajeev Jain, MD, FACP, FASGE, AGAF
- Chair, ABIM Council: Laura E. Evans, MD, MSc
- President, Chief Executive Officer: Furman S. McDonald, MD, MPH
- Subsidiaries: ABIM Foundation _{501(c)(3)}
- Revenue: $55,571,566 (2016)
- Expenses: $62,512,167 (2016)
- Employees: 268 (2015)
- Website: www.abim.org

The American Board of Internal Medicine (ABIM) is a 501(c)(3) nonprofit, self-appointed physician-evaluation organization that certifies physicians practicing internal medicine and its subspecialties. The American Board of Internal Medicine is not a membership society, educational institution, or licensing body.

== History ==
The American Board of Internal Medicine was established on February 28, 1936, by the American Medical Association and the American College of Physicians to issue certification to physicians. In 1989, ABIM began requiring maintenance of certification (MOC) examinations every 10 years for continued board certification.

ABIM is the largest of 24 member certifying boards of the American Board of Medical Specialties. The American Board of Internal Medicine categorizes physicians into one or more of its 20 subspecialties based on training and the passing of a standardized exam, namely:

- Adolescent Medicine
- Adult Congenital Heart Disease
- Advanced Heart Failure & Transplant Cardiology
- Cardiovascular disease
- Clinical Cardiac Electrophysiology
- Intensive care medicine
- Endocrinology, Diabetes & Metabolism
- Gastroenterology
- Geriatric Medicine
- Hematology
- Hospice & Palliative Medicine
- Hospital Medicine
- Infectious Disease
- Interventional Cardiology
- Medical Oncology
- Nephrology
- Pulmonary Disease
- Rheumatology
- Sleep Medicine
- Transplant Hepatology

The certification exams' "blueprints" for each of these specialties can be found at their website.

The current president and chief executive officer of the American Board of Internal Medicine is Furman S. McDonald, MD, MPH.

The American Board of Internal Medicine adopted a governance structure that consists of three entities, namely a Board of Directors, ABIM Council, Specialty Boards and Advisory Committees, and Approval Committees.

== Certification ==
American Board of Internal Medicine Board Certification demonstrates that physicians have completed a residency in a specified medical specialty and have passed a rigorous knowledge assessment exam. Additionally, certification encompasses the six general competencies established by the Accreditation Council on Graduate Medical Education (ACGME). Following regulations established by the American Board of Medical Specialties, in order to be certified, a physician must:

- Complete the requisite predoctoral medical education
- Meet the training requirements
- Meet the licensure requirements and procedural requirements
- Pass a secure board certification examination

Physicians may become board certified when they have successfully completed residency or fellowship training and by passing a secure examination. Unlike licensure, board certification is not a requirement to practice medicine. Many hospitals require internists to be board certified in order to have admitting privileges, and many health plans require certification for contracting or eligibility for select networks.

The American Board of Internal Medicine asserts that there is a growing body of research that suggests:

- A physician's ability to independently and accurately self-assess is in dispute, with research showing no consensus and more clinical experience does not necessarily lead to better outcomes of care.
- Fewer than 30% of physicians examine their own performance data and try to improve. The MOC program structure tries to address these concerns with a sound theoretical rationale via the six ACGME competencies framework and a respectable body of scientific evidence, and to address its relationship to patient outcomes, physician performance, validity of the assessment or educational methods utilized and learning or improvement potential.

The validity of the studies that the American Board of Internal Medicine cites to support these arguments has been questioned, because the authors of these studies are individuals who are employed by, or have previously been employed by, the American Board of Medical Specialties or its related bodies (see Hawkins, Richard E.). In addition, there appears to be a tightly knit, self-credentialed "patient safety/medical quality" industry developing in the United States, from which the authors of many of the studies supporting maintenance of certification have emerged.

The American Board of Internal Medicine is an organization that attempts to assess physicians through proprietary testing and completion of required modules. The American Board of Internal Medicine has issued more than 425,000 initial certificates in internal medicine and its subspecialties in the United States and its territories since its founding. From 2001 to 2013, American Board of Internal Medicine certified 91,024 physicians in general internal medicine. From 2001 to 2013, the American Board of Internal Medicine certified more than 10,000 cardiologists and more than 6,400 medical oncologists. More than 140,000 physicians – including more than 8,000 physicians holding certifications that hold certifications which are valid indefinitely — are currently enrolled in the American Board of Internal Medicine's Maintenance of Certification program.

=== Maintenance of Certification (MOC) ===
The American Board of Internal Medicine asserts that research shows that physician knowledge deteriorates and practice habits and patterns fail to change, over time, in response to medical advances. Every 10 years, some internists and subspecialists certified in or after 1990 renew their certifications through the American Board of Internal Medicine's Maintenance of Certification program.

The American Board of Internal Medicine's Maintenance of Certification program changed in January 2014. The program now requires physicians to:

- Possess a valid medical license
- Earn Maintenance of Certification points (points count toward all certificates you are maintaining)

- Some Maintenance of Certification activity every two years
- 100 Maintenance of Certification points every five years

- Pass Maintenance of Certification exam in one's specialty every 10 years

==== Criticism of Maintenance of Certification Program ====
The Maintenance of Certification program has been criticized for taking time away from patient care, not being proven to improve patient care, and costing more in time and expense than it can justify.

On February 3, 2015, the American Board of Internal Medicine announced more changes to the Maintenance of Certification program. In a press release, the American Board of Internal Medicine apologized that it had "clearly got it wrong", and it admitted that the program changes in January 2014 were instituted prematurely. The American Board of Internal Medicine has suspended the Patient Survey and Patient Safety components for at least two years, and it will make changes to the secure exam to make it more reflective of medical practice among others. The final form of Maintenance of Certification remains to be seen.

On March 10, 2015, an article written by Kurt Eichenwald for Newsweek raised skepticism of the ABIM Foundation and its merit.

And there is another organization called the ABIM Foundation that does ... well, it's not quite clear what it does. Its website reads like a lot of mumbo-jumbo. The Foundation conducts surveys on how "organizational leaders have advanced professionalism among practicing physicians." And it is very proud of its "Choosing Wisely" program, an initiative "to help providers and patients engage in conversations to reduce overuse of tests and procedures," with pamphlets, videos and other means.

Doesn't sound like much, until you crack open the 990s. This organization is loaded. In the tax year ended 2013, it brought in $20 million—not from contributions, not from selling a product, not for providing a service. No, the foundation earned $20 million on the $74 million in assets it holds.

The foundation racked up $5.2 million in expenses, which—other than $245,000 it gave to the ABIM—was divided into two categories: compensation and "other." Who is getting all this compensation? The very same people who are top earners at the ABIM. Deep in the filings, it says the foundation spends $1.9 million in "program and project expenses," with no explanation what the programs and projects are.

There are some expenditures, though, that are easy to understand: The foundation spends $153,439 a year on at least one condominium. And it picks up the tab so the spouse of the top-officer can fly along on business trips for free.

— Kurt Eichenwald

In July 2015, the Annals of Internal Medicine published an independent cost-analysis of the American Board of Internal Medicine's Maintenance of Certification program. Using simulation modeling of the entire American Board of Internal Medicine-certified workforce of US physicians, researchers from the University of California San Francisco and Stanford University estimated that the Feb 2015 version of American Board of Internal Medicine Maintenance of Certification would cost $5.7 billion over ten years, including $561 million in American Board of Internal Medicine's fees and $5.1 billion in time costs (arising from 32.7 million physician hours spent completing Maintenance of Certification requirements). Internists will incur an average of $23,607 (95% CI, $5,380 to $66,383) in Maintenance of Certification costs over 10 years, ranging from $16,725 for general internists to $40,495 for hematologists-oncologists. The authors concluded that "A rigorous evaluation of its effect on clinical and economic outcomes is warranted to balance potential gains in health care quality and efficiency against the high costs identified in this study."

For the first time, the American Board of Internal Medicine faces competition in the certification business from another entity, the National Board of Physicians and Surgeons (nbpas.org). Much of the controversy about the recent behavior of the American Board of Internal Medicine is detailed on their new competitor's website, including a debate between the rival parties. In a survey on Sermo, a physician-only website, 97% of physicians favored the elimination of Maintenance of Certification.

== See also ==
- American Osteopathic Board of Internal Medicine
- ABIM Foundation
