= Decolonization (medicine) =

Medical intervention against antimicrobial-resistant pathogens

- Other names: Bacterial decolonization
- Specialty: Infectious disease, infection control

Decolonization, also bacterial decolonization, is a medical intervention that attempts to rid a patient of an antimicrobial resistant pathogen, such as methicillin-resistant Staphylococcus aureus (MRSA) or antifungal-resistant Candida.

By pre-emptively treating patients who have become colonized with an antimicrobial resistant organism, the likelihood of the patient going on to develop life-threatening healthcare-associated infections is reduced. Common sites of bacterial colonization include the nasal passage, groin, oral cavity and skin.

== History ==
In cooperation with the Centers for Disease Control and Prevention (CDC), the Chicago Antimicrobial Resistance and Infection Prevention Epicenter (C-PIE), Harvard/Irvine Bi-Coastal Epicenter, and Washington University and Barnes Jewish County (BJC) Center for Prevention of Healthcare-Associated Infections conducted a study to test different strategies to prevent and decrease the rate of healthcare-associated infections (HAIs). REDUCE MRSA, which stands for Randomized Evaluation of Decolonization vs. Universal Clearance to Eliminate methicillin-resistant Staphylococcus aureus (MRSA), was completed in September 2011. This study determined decolonization with chlorhexidine and mupirocin of all patients without screening was the most effective method of reducing the presence of MRSA and the overall number of bloodstream infections.

== Medical uses ==
Decolonization is used to reduce rates of infections caused by MRSA. Staphylococcus aureus (S. aureus) is a common cause of hospital related infections, including bloodstream infections and infections of the heart and bone. Additionally, increasing cases of methicillin-susceptible S. aureus (MSSA) and MRSA pose a new challenge as these strains are difficult or impossible to treat with standard antibiotic regimens. Because of the prevalence of S. aureus within the general population and significant number of severe infections caused by this bacteria, decolonization protocols have been implemented in many hospital networks to decrease MRSA infections. By using disinfectants over an extended period of time, decolonization decreases or minimizes patient bacterial load.

== Technique ==
There are several decolonization regimens currently used for MRSA decolonization. Targeted decolonization involves screening patients for MRSA then isolating and implementing decolonization protocols only for patients who test positive for MRSA. On the other hand, universal decolonization involves no screening and decolonization for all patients in a given hospital setting or department.

Products used for decolonization typically involve chlorhexidine rinses for bathing or showering, a mouthwash to clean the oral cavity, and a nasal spray containing mupirocin. It is important to include a mouthwash and nasal spray as individuals commonly carry MRSA in the nose, mouth, and throat. Chlorhexidine is a disinfectant that is used to disinfect skin prior to surgery, surgical instrument sterilization, and in hand disinfectants in healthcare settings. In the mouthwash form, it is commonly used for gingivitis. Mupirocin is a topical antibiotic commonly used for superficial skin infections and has been approved by the FDA for nasal decolonization. Though these are the most commonly used products, there are a number of alternative antibiotics and antiseptics, like povidone-iodine, that are used in decolonization.

Typically, patients use chlorhexidine shampoo or body wash daily and mupirocin nasal spray twice daily. The duration of product use for optimal effect is still being studied, but the most widely studied regimen recommends use of the products as mentioned previously for five days twice a month over a sixth month period. There is limited data supporting decolonization or recommendations of duration of decolonization in outpatient settings.

== Risks and complications ==
Decolonization is a relatively safe medical intervention. Local skin irritation is the most common side effect.

== See also ==
- Antibiotic
- Antifungal
- Antiviral drug
- Bacterial colony
- Infection prevention and control
