= WHO AWaRe =

World Health Organization Logo

The WHO AWaRe Classification is a method to categorize antibiotics into three groups in an effort to improve appropriate antibiotic use. The classification is based, in part, on the risk of developing antibiotic resistance and their importance to medicine. It does not reflect effectiveness or strength. It is accompanied by a book that outlines which and how to use antibiotics in 34 common infections.

The three groups are "access", meaning use can be unrestricted, "watch", meaning care should be taken, and "reserve" meaning use should be saved for cases in which other options are not possible. The recommendation is that greater than 60% of antibiotics used within a country come from the "access" group.

The classification was developed by the World Health Organization (WHO) and launched in 2017. It is an aspect of the WHO Model List of Essential Medicines. The classification as of 2021 covers 258 items. Challenges in its implementation include lack of awareness, little political will, and few resources.

== Classification ==
=== Access ===
Antibiotics in the access group have a lower risk of antibiotic resistance and are typically recommended as first- and second-line treatments of infections. They are generally inexpensive and safe. They should be readily available when needed, and are highlighted in green. Access group antibiotics include amikacin, amoxicillin, amoxicillin/clavulanic acid, ampicillin, benzylpenicillin, cefalexin, chloramphenicol, clindamycin, doxycycline, Metronidazole and nitrofurantoin. Nearly 60% can be taken by mouth.

=== Watch ===
Antibiotics in the watch group are typically broad-spectrum antibiotics with a greater risk of resistance. They are generally only recommended if other options are not possible. They should be used carefully to save their effectiveness for those cases in which "access" antibiotics are not appropriate. Costs are also generally greater, and they are highlighted in yellow. Included in this category are azithromycin, Cefixime, several cephalosporins, ciprofloxacin, clarithromycin, and vancomycin. About 40% are available by mouth.

=== Reserve ===
The reserve group are generally last line options and used for infections not treatable by other antibiotics, i.e. multi-drug-resistant organisms. They are highlighted in red. Include in this category are ceftazidime/avibactam, colistin, polymyxin B (by mouth and by injection), and linezolid. The intravenous formulation of fosfomycin is reserve while the by mouth formulation is watch. About 10% of this group is available by mouth.

=== Not recommended ===
An occasionally included fourth group defines antibiotics whose use is not recommended.
