= Multidrug resistance pump =

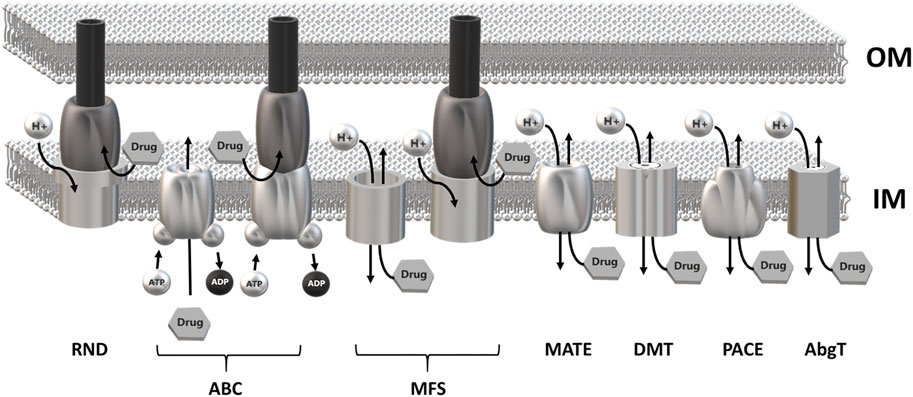
Schematic overview of the major families of bacterial multidrug efflux pumps. RND: Resistance-Nodulation cell Division superfamily; ABC: ATP Binding Cassette superfamily; MFS: Major Facilitator Superfamily; MATE: Multidrug and Toxic Compound Efflux family; DMT: Drug/Metabolite Transporter superfamily; PACE: Proteobacterial Antimicrobial Compound Efflux family; AbgT: p-Aminobenzoyl-glutamate Transporter family

A multidrug resistance (MDR) pump, or multidrug efflux pump, is any efflux pump which is able to expel multiple different categories of antimicrobial drugs. Multidrug resistance pumps can thus confer multiple drug resistance to a microbe and are of interest to the field of microbiology as one of the mechanisms by which microbes develop antimicrobial resistance.

== Evolution and history ==
MDR pumps in pathogenic microbes are characterized by their ability to export a wide variety of substances. These substances are not limited to the antimicrobials used in human medicine, but also include noxious chemicals produced by their host organisms, such as bile. Thus, some microbiologists believe such pumps evolved to aid survival of these microbes in their ecological niches.

In the early 1990s, new families of MDR pumps were discovered and efflux was shown to be the primary mechanism of intrinsic antibiotic resistance for some microbes, such as Pseudomonas aeruginosa. As of 2025, growing interest in the role of MDR pumps in antibiotic resistance has produced research on efflux pump inhibitors (EPIs), which aim to inhibit the function of MDR pumps. Potential EPIs have been identified from plants, secondary metabolites small molecule compounds, or peptides derived from antibody fragments.

There is also interest in MDR transcription factors, like SmeT, which regulates the MDR SmeDEF in Stenotrophomonas maltophilia. Modifying transcription factors might be an alternative way of modifying pump function.

== Classification ==
MDR pumps in bacteria can be classified into seven families depending on the energy source used, the types of substrate exported, and the overall structure of the pump.

Of these seven families, five are major superfamilies:

1. The ATP-binding cassette (ABC) superfamily, the only family which uses ATP as an energy source and is expressed by both gram-positive and gram-negative bacteria
2. The resistance nodulation division (RND) superfamily, a three-part pump expressed by gram-negative bacteria
3. The major facilitator superfamily (MFS), expressed by gram-negative bacteria
4. The small multidrug resistance (SMR) superfamily, expressed by gram-positive bacteria
5. The multidrug and toxic compound extrusion (MATE) family, expressed by gram-positive bacteria

There are also two minor classes: the proteobacterial antimicrobial compound efflux (PACE) family, and the p-aminobenzoyl-glutamate transporter (AbgT) family. Between them, the efflux pump classes cover a wide range of substrate specificities and are involved in numerous cellular processes including cell-to-cell communication, biofilm formation, virulence, and impart cellular protection through extrusion of toxic metabolic byproducts, toxic compounds, and clinical antibiotics.

Extrusion of compounds by efflux pumps is energy dependent. ABC transporters use ATP hydrolysis for efflux. The rest of the characterized pumps use proton motive force. The increased use in antibiotics has resulted in a concomitant increase in antibiotic resistant bacteria. Pathogenic bacterial and fungal species have developed MDR pumps which efflux out many antibiotics and antifungals, increasing the concentration needed for their effect. In bacteria, overexpression of some efflux pumps can result in decreased susceptibility to multiple antibiotics.
