= GARDP =

Nonprofit research and development collaboration

The Global Antibiotic Research & Development Partnership (GARDP) is a Swiss not-for-profit global health organization that aims to assist antibiotic drug development to counter the threat of antibiotic resistance. GARDP forms public and private partnerships to develop and ensure access to antibiotic treatments for people who need them.

It was founded in 2016 by the World Health Organization and the Drugs for Neglected Diseases initiative. GARDP became a Swiss foundation in 2018.

== See also ==
- CARB-X
