= Antimicrobial resistance in Australia =

Antimicrobial resistance (AMR) directly kills about 1,600 people each year in Australia. This is a currently serious threat to both humans and animals in the country. Antimicrobial resistance occurs when a microorganism (i.e. fungi, bacteria, viruses) evolves and gains the ability to become more resistant or completely resistant to the medicine that was previously used to treat it. Drug-resistant bacteria are increasingly difficult to treat, requiring replacement or higher-dose drugs that may be more expensive or more toxic. Resistance can develop through one of the three mechanisms: natural resistant ability in some types of microorganisms, a mutation in genes or receiving the resistance from another species. Antibodies appear naturally due to random mutations, or more often after gradual accumulation over time, and because of abuse of antibiotics. Multidrug-resistance, or MDR, are the microorganisms that are resistant to many types of antimicrobials. "Superbugs" is the term also used for multidrug-resistant microbes, or totally drug-resistant (TDR).

== Causes ==
=== Antimicrobial misuse ===
In October 2017, the Australian Government reported that the Australians were over-using antibiotic. In 2015, Australian doctors dispensed over 30 million antimicrobial prescriptions via the Pharmaceutical Benefits Scheme (PBS) or Repatriation PBS. When antimicrobials are used to kill microbes, a small group of microbes survive. Some, gaining the resistance gene, may still survive and are only weakened. As more antimicrobials of the same type are taken, the surviving microorganisms start to gain resistance to it. The misuse of antimicrobials creates a natural selection condition under which those surviving microbes have a chance to reproduce and the drug-resistant bacteria become more common. When the current dose is no longer effective, a higher dose is required to kill microbes. Over time, the bacteria will become resistant to that particular antimicrobial medication.

=== Genetic mutation ===
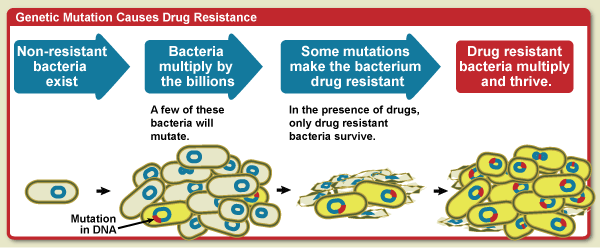
How drug-resistant gene mutation occurs in bacteria. This image represents how a genetic mutation occurs and develops into drug-resistant microbes.

Genetic Mutation is known as one of the natural causes of Antimicrobial Resistance. Microorganisms can reproduce rapidly by replicating itself every period of time, allowing them the ability to evolve and adapt to the changes in the environment. Every time a microbe goes into the reproduction process, there is a risk of random errors in its genetic replication process, called mutation. These mutations can either positively or negatively affect the microbe itself. The genetic mutation could give the microorganism the ability to adapt, become resistant to the antimicrobials which are being used to kill treat the disease. The drug-resistant bacteria reproduces and the gene of resistance becomes dominant and the population becomes resistant to the antimicrobials.

=== Gene transfer ===
Horizontal Gene Transfer is a process in which the microorganisms are able to share their genes with each other. The known result for gene transfer is genetic variation and it could be a serious problem when they are also able to transfer the drug-resistance genes to each other. Bacteria are able to share genetic information with each other via three mechanisms: conjugation, transduction and transformation.

== Mechanism ==
The effect of antimicrobials on microbes is disrupting the internal structures of the bacteria to stops them from reproducing or to kill them. The microbes can gain resistance to the drugs by changing the structures to prevent their actions.

=== Preventing antimicrobial from reaching the target ===
Microorganisms can resist antimicrobials by preventing the drug from reaching its target. Microbes can push away the antimicrobials out of the cell's body by creating pumps placed in the membrane, called efflux pumps. These efflux pumps transport nutrient molecules in and out the cell and can be used to pump the antimicrobials out of the microbe. Another mechanism to withstand the action of antimicrobials is reducing the cell membrane's permeability, preventing the drug get through the cell membrane. The enzyme, β-lactamase, in some drug-resistant bacteria, has the ability to break down the active component in the penicillins. Bacteria can sometimes complicatedly modify the structure and components of the antimicrobials by producing enzymes so the antimicrobials can no longer interact with the microbe cell.

=== Modifying or bypassing the target ===
A microbe can modify its target by changing the composition or the structure, adding different chemical components to prevent the drug from reaching its target. Some bacteria can produce an alternative protein which can replace the original proteins inhibited by the antibiotic. Some bacteria can also reprogram its target by forming a different variant of a needed structure so the antibiotics cannot have action on it.

== Australian Government strategies ==
The Australian Department of Health and Department of Agriculture and Water Resources had worked together and released the first National Antimicrobial Resistance Strategy 2015-2019 (the Strategy) in June 2015. The Australian Government proposed the main strategies to respond to the threat of antimicrobial resistance, minimise its rapid development and control its spread. The strategy of the Australian Government on AMR aligned with the World Health Organisation (WHO) Global Action Plan and provided the objectives for Australia's nation across the human health, animal health, agriculture and food sectors:

1. Improve the knowledge of Australian people about AMR, its consequences and effective actions to counter it via effective communication, education and training. This first key objective aims to raise the understanding of prescribers, patients, professional groups of human and animal health and the Australian general public about the antimicrobial resistance. Improving the awareness of the causes and the consequences of the overuse of antimicrobials via effective communication and education is the first important step to constrain the spread and minimising the development of AMR.
2. Implement effective antimicrobial management measures in human health and animal care facilities to ensure proper and appropriate prescription, distribution and management of antimicrobial medication. The Antimicrobial Stewardship (AMS) refers to the coordinated actions designed to promote and improve the proper use of antimicrobial. The optimal AMS programs are supported by guidelines, protocols and legal frameworks, including prescribing, providing and using antimicrobials and combining monitoring to measure effectiveness and improve the guidelines.
3. Develop One Health's nationwide surveillance of AMR and the use of antimicrobials. The coordinated monitoring of the national use of antimicrobials and antimicrobial resistance is necessary to understand the extent, distribution and impact of resistant organisms and antibacterial use, and identification of drug resistance and emerging trends, and determine the relationship between use and drug resistance. The monitoring data provides evidence to assess policies, set priorities and determine where to act immediately and where resources need to be addressed.
4. Improve infection prevention and control measures on human health and animal care facilities to help prevent infections and spread resistance. Prevention and control of infections are recognised as an essential part of an effective response to AMR, especially when there may be limited or no alternative antibacterial treatments available. Effective infection prevention and control (IPC), the use of personal protective equipment (PPE), equipment disinfection and sanitation are essential. Improving and expanding evidence-based IPC measures implemented in all areas should be informed by monitoring data and consistent with the risk of transmission.
5. Agree on a national research program and promote investment in developing new products and approaches to contain, detect and contain AMR. The promoting and prioritising investment in research and development can create new techniques and strategies to control and respond to antimicrobial resistance. These research, including basic genetic and molecules studies, is crucial for investigating new therapeutic agents for alternating the antimicrobials, developing new diagnostic techniques and ways to reduce the use of antimicrobial.
6. Enhance international partnerships and cooperation on regional and global efforts to respond to AMR. AMR is a global concern, which requires every country to have an action against it. The increasing international movement of people, animals, food and other products can raise the potential for antimicrobial resistance to spread rapidly around the world. Without international cooperation, every country's efforts to fight AMR have limited effectiveness. Australian Government has aligned with the Global Action Plan (GAP), World Health Organisation (WHO), World Organisation for Animal Health (OIE), and the Food and Agriculture Organisation of the United Nations (FAO) on responding to antimicrobial resistance.
