= Colonization resistance =

Physiological function of microbiomes

Colonization resistance is the mechanism whereby the microbiome protects itself against incursion by new and often harmful microorganisms.

Colonization resistance was first identified in 1967, and it was initially referred to as antibiotic-associated susceptibility. It was observed that animals being treated with the antibiotic streptomycin were susceptible to Salmonella enterica at doses 10,000 fold lower than the standard minimal infectious dose. This led to investigations about the mechanisms utilized by endogenous microbial populations that conferred protection against exogenous pathogens attempting to colonize the gut flora.

It has been observed that colonization resistance can occur within the host in a 'direct' or 'indirect' manner. The former refers to particular components of the microbiota directly competing with exogenous pathogens for nutritional niches (e.g. E. coli directly competes with Citrobacter rodentium for carbohydrates in the intestinal lumen) or by producing growth inhibitors (e.g. Bacteroides thuringiensis can secrete bacteriocin that directly targets spore-forming Clostridioides difficile, thus inhibiting its growth through an unknown mechanism), that directly inhibit the colonizing pathogen. Indirect colonization resistance is thought to be mediated through the induction of immune responses in the host that concomitantly inhibit the colonizing pathogen. An example of this has been observed with B. thetaiotaomicron, which can induce the host to produce antimicrobial C-type lectins REGIIIγ and REGIIIβ, both anti-microbial peptides that target gram-positive bacteria.

Scientists found that gut infections increase its microbiota's resistance to subsequent infections, that taurine is used in as a nutrient to nourish and train the microbiota for this by potentiating its production of sulfide and that the exogenous supply of taurine can induce this microbiota alteration.

== See also ==
- Human microbiome
- Decolonization (medicine)
