= CARB-X =

Nonprofit partnership

Combating Antibiotic-Resistant Bacteria Biopharmaceutical Accelerator (CARB-X) is a global nonprofit partnership focused on supporting the development of new antibacterial products. Its mission is to strengthen the pipeline of vaccines, rapid diagnostics, antibiotics and non-traditional products to prevent, diagnose and treat life-threatening bacterial infections.

CARB-X was launched in summer of 2016 at the Boston University School of Law, where Kevin Outterson, CARB-X Executive Director and Professor of Law, teaches health law, corporate law, and co-directs the Health Law Program.

== Antimicrobial Resistance ==
Antibiotics are powerful drugs used to specifically target bacteria and leave human and animal cells unaffected. Bacteria evolve rapidly to adapt to changing environments, including to the threat of these drugs. Antimicrobial resistance occurs when bacteria develop defenses against the antibiotics designed to kill them. Due to the widespread overuse of antibiotics which allows resistant populations to flourish, even the most powerful "last resort" drugs are becoming less effective due to resistance. Without an arsenal of effective antibiotics to treat infections, modern medical procedures – such as chemotherapy and surgeries – are more risky and put patients' lives at risk. Approximately 1.27 million people globally died in 2019 due to drug-resistant bacterial infections. CARB-X supports projects that target the most serious, resistant bacteria identified on global priority lists, syndromes with the greatest global morbidity and mortality, and performance characteristics necessary for patients.

On average, it costs more than $1 billion and takes 10–15 years to develop a new antibiotic for use in patients. A strong economic model to incentivize a steady supply of new antibiotics does not exist. Without enough revenue to recover research and development expenses, small antibiotic companies have been filing for bankruptcy, and large pharmaceutical companies are shuttering their antibiotics divisions. New economic models, support from organizations like CARB-X, and increased investment are needed to drive innovation.

== Funding ==
CARB-X receives funding from a global consortium of governments and foundations. These include the US Department of Health and Human Services Biomedical Advanced Research and Development Authority (BARDA), part of the Administration for Strategic Preparedness and Response (ASPR); Wellcome Trust, a global charitable foundation; the UK Government's Global Antimicrobial Resistance Innovation Fund (UK GAMRIF); the Gates Foundation; Germany's Federal Ministry of Research, Technology, and Space (BMFTR); the government of Canada; the Novo Nordisk Foundation; Italy's Ministry of Economy and Finance, and Japan's Ministry of Health. CARB-X also receives in-kind support from the National Institute of Allergy and Infectious Diseases (NIAID), part of the US National Institutes of Health (NIH).

In its first five years, from 2016 to 2021, CARB-X awarded $361 million to 92 projects. In 2022, BARDA and Wellcome renewed committed renewed funding up to an additional $370 million to CARB-X. In 2023, the German and UK governments renewed funding to CARB-X, committing an additional €41 million and £24 million; the government of Canada committed CAD$6.3 million over two years; and The Novo Nordisk Foundation committed USD$25 million over three years. In 2026, Wellcome renewed its AMR innovation partnership with CARB-X with a $60 million award.

In addition to awarding non-dilutive funding, CARB-X partners with a Global Accelerator Network (GAN) of experts who offer product developers advice on a range of issues, including drug development, business strategy, policy and regulatory affairs.

At the 2024 G7 Joint Finance and Health Ministers’ Meeting, Italy announced a $21 million investment in CARB-X, a partnership that funds early-stage antibiotic research. This funding aims to accelerate the development of new products for preventing, diagnosing, and treating drug-resistant infections. Italy joins five other G7 governments and major global health foundations, and CARB-X has already supported 104 R&D projects globally, with 18 advancing to clinical trials and some reaching the market.

== Global Recognition ==
The G7 Health Ministers have cited CARB-X among the critical initiatives to support as the G7 governments renew their 2021 commitment to address the most dangerous drug-resistant infections. In May 2023, the global threat of Antimicrobial Resistance and the importance of supporting CARB-X as a global push incentive that coordinates and accelerates much-needed antibacterial innovation was featured in G7 Hiroshima Leaders’ Communiqué and the G7 Nagasaki Health Ministers’ Communiqué. The same year, G20 Health Ministers cited CARB-X as playing a critical role in accelerating antimicrobial R&D and access. In October 2024, the importance of supporting CARB-X as a global push incentive that accelerates the research and development of antibacterial products was featured in G7 Health Ministers' Communiqué. At a November 2025 G20 Health Ministerial Meeting, the Ministers acknowledged and affirmed support for AMR initiatives such as CARB-X.

In May 2024, the Antimicrobial Resistance (AMR) Multi-Stakeholder Partnership Platform issued a call for actionable steps to address the rising threat of AMR ahead of the United Nations General Assembly High-Level Meeting on AMR in September 2024. The call recommended increasing public investment in push incentives to catalyze global antimicrobial research and development efforts and cited CARB-X as a push mechanism that should be mobilized due to CARB-X’s critical role in supporting the discovery and development or new antimicrobials.

CARB-X also was named in the Political Declaration on antimicrobial resistance (AMR) approved by United Nations Member States during the High-Level Meeting on September 26, 2024 at the 79th Session of the UN General Assembly. “The research and development pipeline for vaccines, diagnostics, therapeutics, especially antimicrobials and alternatives to the use of antimicrobials, to prevent and address antimicrobial resistance, especially antibiotics, are insufficient,” UN Member States note with concern in the declaration. As a consequence, they openly “recognize the benefits of public-private partnerships in the development of and access to antimicrobials, vaccines, diagnostics and alternatives to antimicrobials and in contributing to supply chain sustainability, and take note of the work of the Combating Antibiotic-Resistant Bacteria Biopharmaceutical Accelerator (CARB-X) and the Global Antibiotic Research and Development Partnership (GARDP).”

== See also ==
- GARDP
