= Resistome =

The resistome has been used to describe to two similar yet separate concepts:

- All the antibiotic resistance genes in communities of both pathogenic and non-pathogenic bacteria.
- All of the resistance genes in an organism, how they are inherited, and how their transcription levels vary to defend against pathogens like viruses and bacteria.

== Discovery and Current Data ==
The resistome was first used to describe the resistance capabilities of bacteria preventing the effectiveness of antibiotics . Although antibiotics and their accompanying antibiotic resistant genes come from natural habitats, before next-generation sequencing, most studies of antibiotic resistance had been confined to the laboratory. Increased availability of whole-genome and metagenomic next-generation sequencing techniques have revealed significant reservoirs of antibiotic resistant bacteria outside of clinical settings. Repeated testing of soil metagenomes revealed that in urban, agricultural, and forest environments, spore-forming soil bacteria showed resistance to most major antibiotics regardless of where they'd originated. In this study, they observed nearly 200 different resistance profiles among the bacteria sequenced, indicating a diverse and robust response to the antibiotics tested regardless of their bacterial target or natural or synthetic origin. Antibiotic resistant bacteria have observed through metagenomic surveys in non-clinical environments such as water treatment facilities and human microbiomes like the mouth. We now know that the antibiotic resistome exists in every environmental niche on Earth, and sequences from ancient permafrost reveal that antibiotic resistance has been around millennia before the introduction of human-synthesized antibiotics.

The Comprehensive Antibiotic Research Database (CARD) was created to compile a database of resistance genes from this rapidly increasingly available bacterial genomic data. The CARD is a compilation of sequence data and identification of resistance genes in unannotated genome sequences. The database "includes bioinformatic tools that enable the identification of antibiotic resistance genes from whole- or partial-genome sequence data, including unannotated raw sequence assembly contigs". It is a resource intended to create a better understanding of the resistome and links healthcare, environmental, agricultural datasets.

The ResistomeDB was published in 2020 to store the Global Ocean Resistome., based on the metagenomics samples from the Tara Oceans Project.

=== Human pathogens ===
A major question surrounding the environmental resistome is: How do pathogenic bacteria acquire antibiotic resistance genes from the environment (and vice versa)? To answer this, we need to consider the mechanisms of horizontal gene transfer (HGT) and the various opportunities for contact between environmental bacteria and human pathogens.

In soil antibiotic resistant bacterial communities, resistance-conferring genes have been found on mobile genetic elements. Similarly, in an analysis of the resistome in a water treatment plant, plasmids and other protein-coding mobile genetic elements were present at all levels of filtration, and these mobile elements harbored genes for resistance. These soil and water-based resistant communities are known as reservoirs, from which resistance can transfer to pathogenic bacteria. Metagenomic sequencing and short-read based assembly have revealed the exchange of antibiotic resistance genes between non-pathogenic environmental soil bacteria and clinical pathogens. The portions in the soil bacteria perfectly match the identity of several diverse human pathogens and contain resistance cassettes against five classes of antibiotics. These resistance cassettes also contain sequences that reflect recent horizontal gene transfer and provide the mechanism for how that transfer occurred. These antibiotic resistant genes also retain their functionality even after they are entirely removed from the context of their original host, emphasizing their compatibility with a wide range of hosts, including pathogens. Interestingly, the high conservation of resistance gene identity also was observed in the human gut microbiome. Although the average amino acid similarity between human gut microbiota and resistant pathogens was only around 30.2 to 45.5%, their resistance genes perfectly matched those of the pathogenic bacteria, suggesting the resistomes of the human gastrointestinal tract, soil, and clinical pathogens are all connected. It should be noted, however, that the risk of transmission cannot simply be extrapolated from abundance of resistome genes in a population, and a multifaceted approach to risk analyses should be considered to fully understand the risks posed. For example, the mobility of antibiotic resistant genes has been observed to be dependent on if the population is pathogenic or not, with pathogen communities having far higher proportions of mobile genetic elements.

When antibiotic resistance is present in the environment, it is important to consider how human pathogens are interacting or integrated into those environments, and how antibiotic resistance is being exchanged there. For example, mouth bacteria can reach other parts of the body through the digestive and blood systems, and our saliva readily transfers bacteria to other people, so there are several ways for antibiotic resistant bacteria in the oral micriobiome to readily transfer their resistance genes to other, potentially pathogenic bacterial communities. Additionally, soil and pathogenic resistomes have been observed not to be distinct, so it's essential that we understand environmental resistance in aquatic and other environments with high likelihood of human pathogen interaction. In the hyper-antibiotic resistant Pseudomonas aeruginosa environmental stress key to the way its resistome is expressed; intrinsic, acquired, and adaptive forms of resistant gene expression occur under different environmental pressures and lead to significant challenges in developing effective treatments in response.

Our understanding of how humans create additional positive selective pressure for antibiotic resistance in non-clinical environments is essential now more than ever. The rise in antibiotic resistance has severely reduced the efficacy of antibiotic drugs, posing severe cause for concern in the realm of drug development and maintaining public health. Human-manufactured antibiotics are not the only source of antibiotic resistant pressure in the wild, as antibiotics are present at various concentrations and function as both defense and signaling mechanisms, selecting for antibiotic resistance naturally in the environment. For this reason, studying natural antibiotics and the patterns of antibiotic resistance that naturally arise in the wild may help us to predict and respond to antibiotic resistance in clinical settings. Analyses of metagenomic sequence data are useful tools for understanding how human impact influences the spread of resistance genes. An effect of the introduction of high levels of human-made antibiotics in the environment is the promotion of antibiotic resistance even in the absence of natural antibiotic production. Secondary stress conditions like heavy metal pollution cause higher HGT as a stress response, which also likely contributes to the dissemination of antibiotic resistant genes. Also, rapid increase in human populations without adequate wastewater treatment allows for more chance for human pathogens to be in contact with environmental resistance-carrying bacteria, so it's important to look to wastewater treatment as a source of HGT.

== Infection resistance ==
The resistome also refers to an inherited set of genes used to resist infections. This concept is also referred to as innate immunity, and resistance genes within the resistome provide different functions for immune response, and are differentially transcribed. Interestingly, in one study of Arabidopsis thaliana, activated regions on the chromosome for resistance against both bacteria and viruses are clustered together, likely meaning they are co-regulated.

Comparing different mutations in the germline can be used to help define the size and position of the resistome, this set of genes conferring an inherited immune response. Because of mutation, the 'universal resistome', a set of resistance genes shared among all mice, similar to the concept of the pan-microbiome, is likely extremely small.
