= Antimicrobial resistance =

Resistance of microbes to drugs directed against them

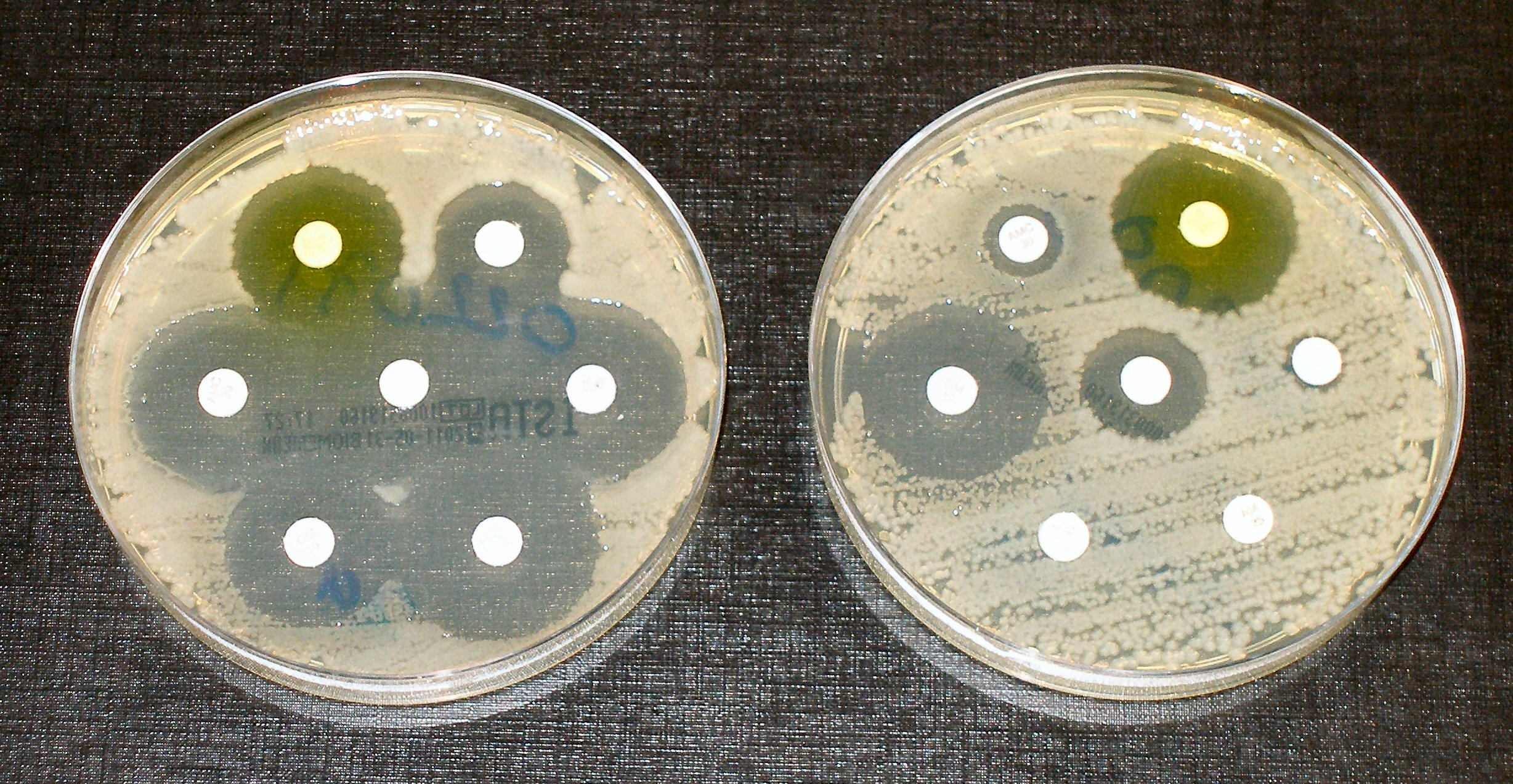
Antibiotic resistance tests: Bacteria are streaked on solid medium in Petri dishes and paper disks are laid on the surface, each impregnated with a different antibiotic. Clear rings, such as those on the left, show that bacteria have not grown around the disks, indicating that these bacteria are not resistant. The bacteria on the right are fully resistant to three of seven and partially resistant to two of seven antibiotics tested.

Antimicrobial resistance (AMR or AR) occurs when microbes evolve mechanisms that protect them from antimicrobials, which are drugs used to treat infections in humans, animals, and plants. Any microbe can develop resistance, including bacteria (antibiotic resistance), viruses (antiviral resistance), parasites (antiparasitic resistance), and fungi (antifungal resistance). Together, these adaptations fall under the AMR umbrella, posing a challenge to all countries and all demographics. Misuse and improper management of antimicrobials are primary drivers of this resistance, though it can also occur naturally through genetic mutations and the spread of resistant genes. Microbes resistant to multiple drugs are termed multidrug-resistant (MDR) and are sometimes called superbugs.

Antibiotic resistance is a serious result of AMR. Resistance arises through spontaneous mutation, horizontal gene transfer, and increased selective pressure from antibiotic overuse, both in medicine and agriculture, which accelerates resistance development. Preventive measures, such as using narrow-spectrum antibiotics and improving hygiene practices, aim to reduce the spread of resistance.

The World Health Organization (WHO) claims that AMR is one of the top global public health and development threats, estimating that bacterial AMR was directly responsible for 1.27 million global deaths in 2019 and contributed to over 4 million deaths in 2021. The burden of AMR is immense, with nearly 5 million annual deaths associated with resistant infections. Infections from AMR microbes are more challenging to treat and often require costly alternative therapies that may have more severe side effects. Moreover, the WHO and other international bodies warn that AMR could lead to up to 10 million deaths annually by 2050 unless actions are taken. Global initiatives, such as calls for international AMR treaties, emphasize coordinated efforts to limit misuse, fund research, and provide access to necessary antimicrobials in developing nations. However, the COVID-19 pandemic redirected resources and scientific attention away from AMR, intensifying the challenge.

In 2026, Israeli scientists announced the discovery of bacteria able to create dozens of copies of genes which help them survive antibiotics.

== Definition ==
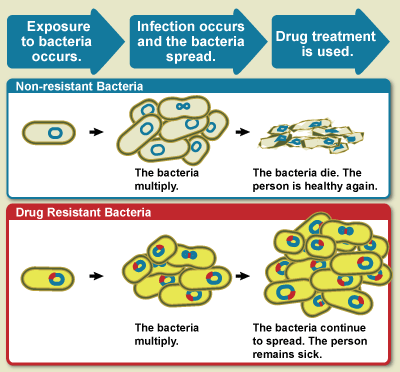
Diagram showing the difference between non-resistant bacteria and drug resistant bacteria. Non-resistant bacteria multiply, and upon drug treatment, the bacteria die. Drug resistant bacteria multiply as well, but upon drug treatment, the bacteria continue to spread.

Antimicrobial resistance means that a microorganism is resistant to an antimicrobial drug that was once able to treat an infection by that microorganism. Resistance is a property of the microbe, not a person or other organism infected by a microbe. All types of microbes can develop drug resistance. Thus, there are antibiotic, antifungal, antiviral and antiparasitic resistance.

Antibiotic resistance is a subset of antimicrobial resistance. This more specific resistance is linked to bacteria and thus broken down into two further subsets, microbiological and clinical. Microbiological resistance is the most common and occurs from genes, mutated or inherited, that allow the bacteria to resist the mechanism to kill the microbe associated with certain antibiotics. Clinical resistance is shown through the failure of many therapeutic techniques where the bacteria that are normally susceptible to a treatment become resistant after surviving the outcome of the treatment. In both cases of acquired resistance, the bacteria can pass the genetic catalyst for resistance through horizontal gene transfer: conjugation, transduction, or transformation. This allows the resistance to spread across the same species of pathogen or even similar bacterial pathogens.

== Overview ==
WHO report released in April 2014 stated, "this serious threat is no longer a prediction for the future, it is happening right now in every region of the world and has the potential to affect anyone, of any age, in any country. Antibiotic resistance—when bacteria change so antibiotics no longer work in people who need them to treat infections—is now a major threat to public health."

In 2024, nearly 5 million deaths were associated with AMR and deaths attributable to AMR numbered 1.27 million. One in five people who died due to AMR were children under five years old.

In 2018, WHO considered antibiotic resistance to be one of the biggest threats to global health, food security and development. Deaths attributable to AMR vary by area:

| Place | Deaths per 100,000 attributable to AMR |
|---|---|
| North Africa and Middle East | 11.2 |
| Southeast and East Asia, and Oceania | 11.7 |
| Latin America and Caribbean | 14.4 |
| Central and Eastern Europe and Central Asia | 17.6 |
| South Asia | 21.5 |
| Sub-Saharan Africa | 23.7 |

The European Centre for Disease Prevention and Control calculated that in 2015, there were 671,689 infections in the EU and European Economic Area caused by antibiotic-resistant bacteria, resulting in 33,110 deaths. Most were acquired in healthcare settings. In 2019 there were 133,000 deaths caused by AMR.

== Causes ==
AMR is driven largely by the misuse and overuse of antimicrobials. They reproduce and spread quickly, and they also can adapt to their environment and change how well they can survive. This leads to microbes either evolving a defense against drugs used to treat them, or certain strains of microbes that have a natural resistance to antimicrobials becoming much more prevalent than the ones that are easily defeated with medication. Genetic changes can also occur, which would allow the microbe to survive. While antimicrobial resistance does occur naturally over time, the use of antimicrobial agents in a variety of settings both within the healthcare industry and outside of has led to antimicrobial resistance becoming increasingly more prevalent.

Although many microbes develop resistance to antibiotics over time through natural mutation, overprescribing and inappropriate prescription of antibiotics have accelerated the problem. During mutation, when replication happens, these mutations help individual microbes survive exposure. It is possible that as many as 1 in 3 prescriptions written for antibiotics are unnecessary. Every year, approximately 154 million prescriptions for antibiotics are written. Of these, up to 46 million are unnecessary or inappropriate for the condition that the patient has. Microbes may naturally develop resistance through genetic mutations that occur during cell division, and although random mutations are rare, many microbes reproduce frequently and rapidly, increasing the chances of members of the population acquiring a mutation that increases resistance. In contrast to that, recent research suggests that, contrary to the traditional model of rapid genetic mutation, mycobacteria maintain high genomic stability under antibiotic pressure, relying instead on phenotypic tolerance and DNA-repair mechanisms for survival. Many individuals stop taking antibiotics when they begin to feel better. When this occurs, it is possible that the microbes that are less susceptible to treatment still remain in the body. If these microbes are able to continue to reproduce, this can lead to an infection by bacteria that are less susceptible or even resistant to an antibiotic. Microbes may also get genes from each other, which makes them drug-resistant. Bacteria that have drug-resistant DNA often transfer a copy of these genes to the other bacteria. They can then multiply and thrive. This process, known as horizontal gene transfer, allows resistance genes to spread rapidly between different bacterial species through mechanisms such as conjugation, transformation, and transduction.

Bacteria become resistant to antibiotics by changing themselves or acquiring resistance genes from other bacteria. Over the past 20 years, antimicrobial resistance (AMR) has grown, making common infections like respiratory infections, urinary tract infections, STDs, and tuberculosis harder to treat. New antibiotics are not being developed fast enough and may lead to a "post-antibiotic era" where some infections are untreatable.

AMR makes infections more difficult and costly to treat. Proper antibiotic use—correct drug, dose, and duration—and strict hospital hygiene are essential. Combating AMR requires cooperation among governments, healthcare workers, researchers, pharmaceutical companies, farmers, and the public through responsible antibiotic use, monitoring resistance, limiting antibiotics in animals, and improving access to medicines, vaccines, and tests.

Prevention is the most effective strategy. Along with careful antibiotic use, there is a need for new drugs, alternative treatments, better diagnostics, and vaccines. Without coordinated global action, vital medical procedures like surgery, organ transplants, neonatal care, and cancer treatment could be at risk.

=== Natural occurrence ===
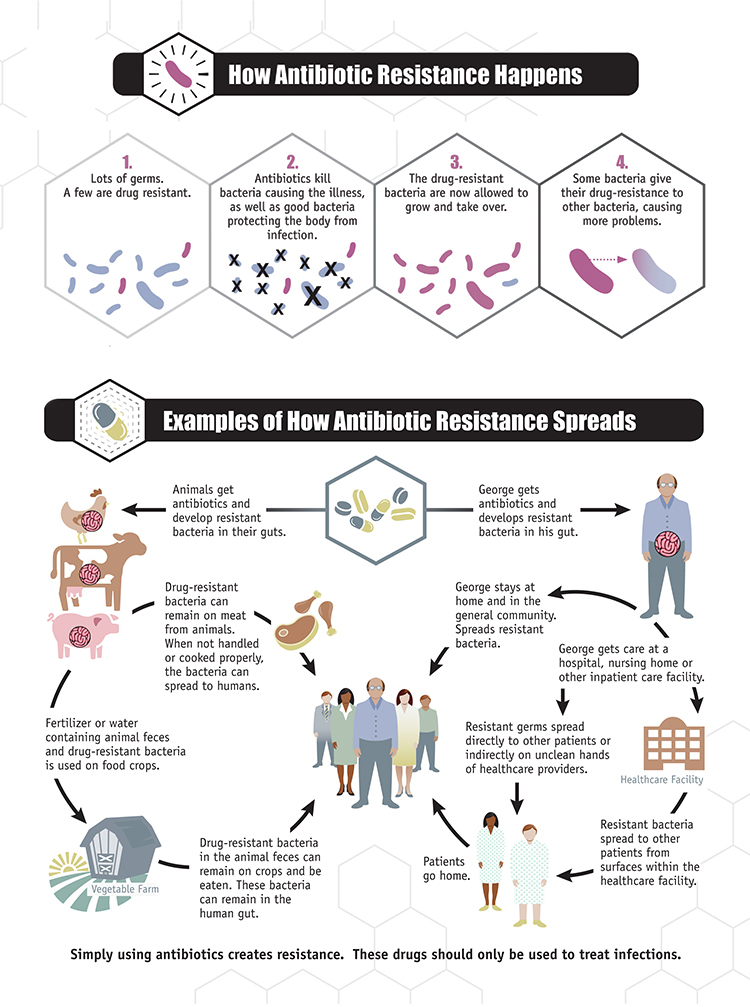
A CDC infographic on how antibiotic resistance (a major type of antimicrobial resistance) happens and spreads

AMR is a naturally occurring process. Antimicrobial resistance can evolve naturally due to continued exposure to antimicrobials. Natural selection means that organisms that are able to adapt to their environment, survive, and continue to produce offspring. As a result, the types of microorganisms that are able to survive over time with continued attack by certain antimicrobial agents will naturally become more prevalent in the environment, and those without this resistance will become obsolete.

Some contemporary antimicrobial resistances have also evolved naturally before the use of antimicrobials of human clinical uses. For instance, methicillin-resistance evolved as a pathogen of hedgehogs, possibly as a co-evolutionary adaptation of the pathogen to hedgehogs that are infected by a dermatophyte that naturally produces antibiotics. Also, many soil fungi and bacteria are natural competitors and the original antibiotic penicillin discovered by Alexander Fleming rapidly lost clinical effectiveness in treating humans and, furthermore, none of the other natural penicillins (F, K, N, X, O, U1 or U6) are currently in clinical use.

Antimicrobial resistance can be acquired from other microbes through swapping genes in a process termed horizontal gene transfer. This means that once a gene for resistance to an antibiotic appears in a microbial community, it can then spread to other microbes, potentially moving from a non-disease causing microbe to a disease-causing microbe. This process is heavily driven by the natural selection processes that happen during antibiotic use or misuse.

Over time, most of the strains of bacteria and infections present will be the type resistant to the antimicrobial agent being used to treat them, making this agent now ineffective to defeat most microbes. With the increased use of antimicrobial agents, there is a speeding up of this natural process.

=== Self-medication ===
In the vast majority of countries, antibiotics can only be prescribed by a doctor and supplied by a pharmacy. Self-medication by consumers is defined as "the taking of medicines on one's own initiative or on another person's suggestion, who is not a certified medical professional", and it has been identified as one of the primary reasons for the evolution of antimicrobial resistance. Self-medication with antibiotics is an unsuitable way of using them but a common practice in resource-constrained countries. The practice exposes individuals to the risk of bacteria that have developed antimicrobial resistance. Many people resort to this out of necessity, when access to a physician is unavailable, or when patients have a limited amount of time or money to see a doctor. This increased access makes it extremely easy to obtain antimicrobials. An example is India, where in the state of Punjab 73% of the population resorted to treating their minor health issues and chronic illnesses through self-medication.

Self-medication is higher outside the hospital environment. The prevalence of self-medication in low- and middle-income countries (LMICs) ranges from 8.1% to 93%. Accessibility, affordability, and conditions of health facilities, as well as the health-seeking behavior, are factors that influence self-medication in low- and middle-income countries. Two issues with self-medication are the lack of knowledge of the public on the dangerous effects of certain antimicrobials (for example ciprofloxacin which can cause tendonitis, tendon rupture and aortic dissection) and broad microbial resistance and when to seek medical care if the infection is not clearing. To determine the public's knowledge and preconceived notions on antibiotic resistance, a screening of 3,537 articles published in Europe, Asia, and North America was done. Of the 55,225 total people surveyed in the articles, 70% had heard of antibiotic resistance previously, but 88% of those people thought it referred to some type of physical change in the human body.

=== Clinical misuse ===
Clinical misuse by healthcare professionals is another contributor to increased antimicrobial resistance. Studies done in the US show that the indication for treatment of antibiotics, choice of the agent used, and the duration of therapy was incorrect in up to 50% of the cases studied. In 2010 and 2011 about a third of antibiotic prescriptions in outpatient settings in the United States were not necessary. Another study in an intensive care unit in a major hospital in France has shown that 30% to 60% of prescribed antibiotics were unnecessary. These inappropriate uses of antimicrobial agents promote the evolution of antimicrobial resistance by supporting the bacteria in developing genetic alterations that lead to resistance.

According to research conducted in the US that aimed to evaluate physicians' attitudes and knowledge on antimicrobial resistance in ambulatory settings, only 63% of those surveyed reported antibiotic resistance as a problem in their local practices, while 23% reported the aggressive prescription of antibiotics as necessary to avoid failing to provide adequate care. This demonstrates that many doctors underestimate the impact that their own prescribing habits have on antimicrobial resistance as a whole. It also confirms that some physicians may be overly cautious and prescribe antibiotics for both medical or legal reasons, even when clinical indications for use of these medications are not always confirmed. This can lead to unnecessary antimicrobial use, a pattern which may have worsened during the COVID-19 pandemic.

Studies have shown that common misconceptions about the effectiveness and necessity of antibiotics to treat common mild illnesses contribute to their overuse.

Important to the conversation of antibiotic use is the veterinary medical system. Veterinary oversight is required by law for all medically important antibiotics. Veterinarians use the Pharmacokinetic/pharmacodynamic model (PK/PD) approach to ensuring that the correct dose of the drug is delivered to the correct place at the correct timing.

=== Pandemics, disinfectants and healthcare systems ===
Increased antibiotic use during the early waves of the COVID-19 pandemic may exacerbate this global health challenge. Moreover, pandemic burdens on some healthcare systems may contribute to antibiotic-resistant infections. The use of disinfectants such as alcohol-based hand sanitizers, and antiseptic hand wash may also have the potential to increase antimicrobial resistance. Overuse of disinfectants can lead to mutations that induce antimicrobial resistance. On the other hand, "increased hand hygiene, decreased international travel, and decreased elective hospital procedures may have reduced AMR pathogen selection and spread in the short term" during the COVID-19 pandemic.

Critically ill patients are prone to infections, and because of that, they often require antimicrobials. The more antimicrobials, the more resistance one becomes to it.

Antimicrobial resistance (AMR) significantly strains healthcare systems and national economies. The World Bank estimates that by 2050, AMR could increase healthcare costs by around US$1 trillion and cause global economic losses of US$1–3.4 trillion annually by 2030. Resistant infections are harder to treat, often requiring longer hospital stays, additional tests, and stronger, more expensive medications, placing extra pressure on hospitals and health systems, especially during pandemics. A 2024 United Nations High-Level Meeting on AMR has pledged to reduce deaths associated with bacterial AMR by 10% over the next six years. In their first major declaration on the issue since 2016, global leaders also committed to raising $100 million to update and implement AMR action plans. However, the final draft of the declaration omitted an earlier target to reduce antibiotic use in animals by 30% by 2030, due to opposition from meat-producing countries and the farming industry. Critics argue this omission is a major weakness, as livestock accounts for around 73% of global sales of antimicrobial agents, including antibiotics, antivirals, and antiparasitics.

=== Environmental pollution ===
Considering the complex interactions between humans, animals and the environment, it is also important to consider the environmental aspects and contributors to antimicrobial resistance.

One of these factors is human and hospital waste, which is a substantial contributor to environmental antimicrobial resistance (AMR). It is estimated that around 50–80% of antibiotics are passed unmetabolized in urine and 4–30% in feces, causing large quantities of active antibiotics to enter sewage systems. Sewage environments contain high levels of antimicrobial-resistant bacteria (ARB), antimicrobial resistance genes (ARGs), and mobile genetic elements such as plasmids, which enable rapid gene exchange. Wastewater treatment plants (WWTPs) are typically not designed to remove AMR; in some cases, multidrug-resistant species such as Escherichia, Shigella, and Klebsiella can increase twofold in treated wastewater. Methicillin-resistant Staphylococcus aureus (MRSA) has also been detected in both raw and treated sewage.

==== Antibiotic pollution from pharmaceutical manufacturing ====
Pharmaceutical manufacturing is another source of antibiotic contamination in the environment. Wastewater produced during antibiotic manufacturing can contain antibiotic residues that enter nearby rivers, lakes, and soil when waste is inadequately treated or discharged. These residues may create conditions that favor the selection of antibiotic-resistant bacteria. Manufacturing sites with high antibiotic concentrations can therefore contribute to the environmental selection and spread of antimicrobial resistance.

The presence of antibiotic residues in aquatic environments is a concern because bacteria and antibiotic resistance genes can circulate through interconnected environmental systems. Contaminated water and soil may provide pathways through which resistant bacteria and resistance genes spread, although the extent to which manufacturing-related pollution contributes to human infections remains difficult to quantify.

In September 2024, the World Health Organization published guidance on wastewater and solid waste management for antibiotic manufacturing. The guidance establishes a scientific basis for discharge targets intended to limit antibiotic pollution and reduce the risk of resistance development. It also recommends risk management practices, environmental monitoring, independent auditing, and greater transparency. These measures are intended to reduce pollution while maintaining access to essential antibiotics.

Agriculture is also a major contributor to environmental AMR. Manure from livestock (such as cattle, sheep, etc.) contains residual antibiotics, which enter the soil as farmers usually use it as fertilizer. These are typically at levels of 1–10 mg/kg, and also contain ARBs and ARGs. One megaton of antibiotics has been estimated to have entered global soils through manure application. Pathogens can survive in soil for up to 10 years and on plant surfaces for up to 1 year, thereby enabling long-term environmental continuation of AMR. Because manure can be applied to diverse crops, residual antibiotics and resistance genes can enter plant tissues and the surrounding soil microbiota, contributing to AMR detected on fruits and vegetables.

Heavy metals in soil, often introduced through fertilizers or industrial processes, can drive cross- and co-resistance mechanisms that select for antibiotic-resistant bacteria even when no antibiotics are present. Similar selective results happen with biocides and pesticides.

Aquaculture is an underrecognized source of environmental AMR. Approximately 70% of antibiotics administered in aquaculture enter surrounding waterways, and tetracycline-resistant genes have been found even in isolated environments such as Antarctica and the Arctic. Antibiotic usage varies substantially across countries, showing the major differences in regulatory oversight. High antibiotic use in many Asian aquaculture systems has added to the elevated levels of clinically important resistance genes in sediments and river systems.

Recent research has shown that AMR also occurs through the air. Airborne resistance genes have been detected at high levels in major urban centers, and farms have been determined as hotspots for airborne AMR, with resistance markers detected in the air surrounding animal operations.

=== Food production ===
==== Livestock ====
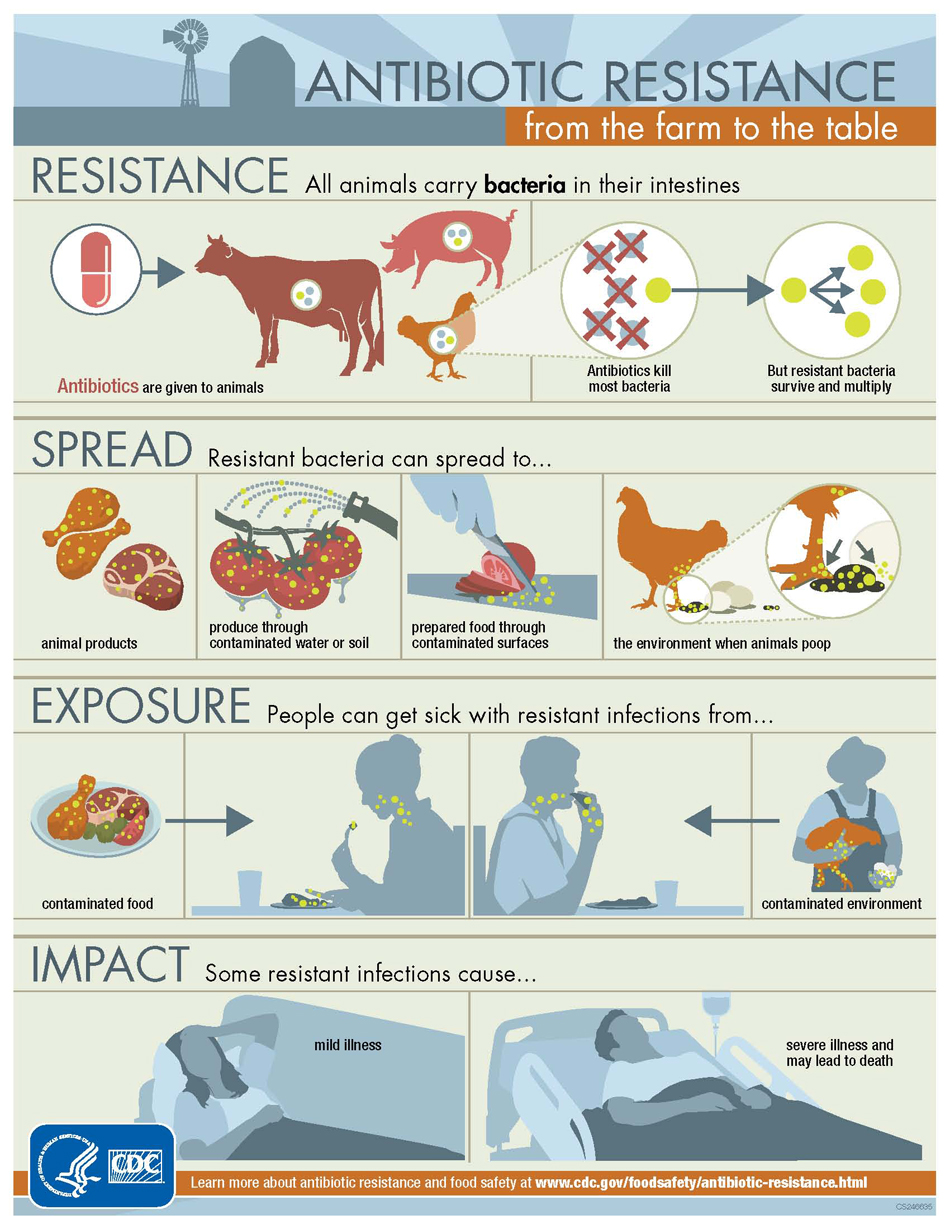
A CDC infographic on how antibiotic resistance spreads through farm animals

The antimicrobial resistance crisis also extends to the food industry, specifically with food producing animals. With an ever-increasing human population, there is constant pressure to intensify productivity in many agricultural sectors, including the production of meat as a source of protein. Antibiotics are fed to livestock to act as growth supplements, and a preventive measure to decrease the likelihood of infections.

Farmers typically use antibiotics in animal feed to improve growth rates and prevent infections. However, this is illogical as antibiotics are used to treat infections and not prevent infections. 80% of antibiotic use in the U.S. is for agricultural purposes and about 70% of these are medically important. Overusing antibiotics gives the bacteria time to adapt leaving higher doses or even stronger antibiotics needed to combat the infection. Though antibiotics for growth promotion were banned throughout the EU in 2006, 40 countries still use antibiotics to promote growth.

This can result in the transfer of resistant bacterial strains into the food that humans eat, causing potentially fatal transfer of disease. While the practice of using antibiotics as growth promoters does result in better yields and meat products, it is a major issue and needs to be decreased to prevent antimicrobial resistance. Though the evidence linking antimicrobial usage in livestock to antimicrobial resistance is limited, the World Health Organization Advisory Group on Integrated Surveillance of Antimicrobial Resistance strongly recommended the reduction of use of medically important antimicrobials in livestock. Additionally, the Advisory Group stated that such antimicrobials should be expressly prohibited for both growth promotion and disease prevention in food producing animals.

By mapping antimicrobial consumption in livestock, it was predicted that in 228 countries there would be a total 67% increase in consumption of antibiotics by livestock by 2030. In some countries such as Brazil, Russia, India, China, and South Africa it is predicted that a 99% increase will occur. Several countries have restricted the use of antibiotics in livestock, including Canada, China, Japan, and the US. These restrictions are sometimes associated with a reduction of the prevalence of antimicrobial resistance in humans.

In the United States the Veterinary Feed Directive went into practice in 2017 dictating that All medically important antibiotics to be used in feed or water for food animal species require a veterinary feed directive (VFD) or a prescription.

==== Pesticides ====
Most pesticides protect crops against insects and plants, but in some cases antimicrobial pesticides are used to protect against various microorganisms such as bacteria, viruses, fungi, algae, and protozoa. The overuse of many pesticides in an effort to have a higher yield of crops has resulted in many of these microbes evolving a tolerance against these antimicrobial agents. Currently there are over 4000 antimicrobial pesticides registered with the US Environmental Protection Agency (EPA) and sold to market, showing the widespread use of these agents. It is estimated that for every single meal a person consumes, 0.3 g of pesticides is used, as 90% of all pesticide use is in agriculture. A majority of these products are used to help defend against the spread of infectious diseases, and hopefully protect public health. But out of the large amount of pesticides used, it is also estimated that less than 0.1% of those antimicrobial agents, actually reach their targets. That leaves over 99% of all pesticides used available to contaminate other resources. In soil, air, and water these antimicrobial agents are able to spread, coming in contact with more microorganisms and leading to these microbes evolving mechanisms to tolerate and further resist pesticides. The use of antifungal azole pesticides that drive environmental azole resistance have been linked to azole resistance cases in the clinical setting. The same issues confront the novel antifungal classes (e.g. orotomides) which are again being used in both the clinic and agriculture.

=== Wild birds ===
Wildlife, including wild and migratory birds, serve as indicators of ecosystem health. They act as a reservoir for zoonotic diseases and antimicrobial-resistant organisms. Birds are a key link between the transmission of zoonotic diseases to human populations. By the same token, increased contact between wild birds and human populations (including domesticated animals), has increased the amount of anti-microbial resistance (AMR) to the bird population. The introduction of AMR to wild birds positively correlates with human pollution and increased human contact. Additionally, wild birds can participate in horizontal gene transfer with bacteria, leading to the transmission of antibiotic-resistant genes (ARG).

For simplicity, wild bird populations can be divided into two major categories, wild sedentary birds and wild migrating birds. Wild sedentary bird exposure to AMR is through increased contact with densely populated areas, human waste, domestic animals, and domestic animal/livestock waste. Especially if they are predators, wild, sedentary birds can come into contact with prey that interact more closely with humans. Wild migrating birds interact with sedentary birds in different environments along their migration route. This increases the rate and diversity of AMR across varying ecosystems.

Neglect of wildlife in the global discussions surrounding health security and AMR, creates large barriers to true AMR surveillance. The surveillance of antimicrobial-resistant resistant organisms in wild birds is a potential metric for the rate of AMR in the environment. This surveillance also allows for further investigation into the transmission routes between different ecosystems and human populations (including domesticated animals and livestock). Such information gathered from wild bird biomes, can help identify patterns of diseased transmission and better target interventions. These targeted interventions can inform the use of antimicrobial agents and reduce the persistence of multidrug resistant organisms.

Recent studies demonstrate the importance of wild birds as sentinels for AMR. For example, Escherichia coli isolated from free-ranging Bonelli's eagles (Aquila fasciata) in eastern Spain showed that 53.3% of isolates were resistant to at least one antimicrobial, and 29.3% were multidrug-resistant, despite the species' minimal exposure to human-associated environments. The study also reported resistance to colistin and meropenem, two last-resort antibiotics, and documented 19 different multidrug-resistance patterns, suggesting persistent and heterogeneous selective pressures in the environment. Because Bonelli's eagles live far from humans and urban areas, they acquire resistance largely through interactions with prey species that interact with humans. These findings demonstrate how AMR can spread into remote ecosystems via indirect pathways, strengthening the role of wild birds, particularly apex predators, as effective bioindicators in AMR surveillance.

=== Companion animals ===
Within the One Health framework, companion animals such as dogs and cats serve as critical domestic counterparts to wildlife reservoirs like wild birds in the epidemiology of antimicrobial resistance (AMR). Because household pets share indoor residential spaces, furniture, and close physical contact with humans, bidirectional transmission of multi-drug resistant organisms (MDROs) frequently occurs.

Pets receive antimicrobial therapies that mirror human formulations, creating selective pressure for resistant strains. Clinically significant pathogens—including methicillin-resistant Staphylococcus pseudintermedius (MRSP), methicillin-resistant Staphylococcus aureus (MRSA), and extended-spectrum beta-lactamase (ESBL)-producing Escherichia coli—are routinely isolated from both pets and their human co-inhabitants. Furthermore, companion animals act as valuable epidemiological sentinels; because they inhabit the same domestic microenvironments and are exposed to equivalent community stressors, monitoring AMR patterns in veterinary clinical isolates provides early insight into resistance pressures circulating within human residential communities.

== Prevention ==
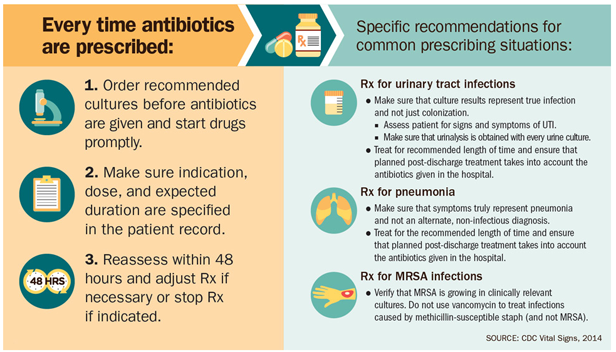
Mission Critical: Preventing Antibiotic Resistance (CDC report, 2014)

There have been increasing public calls for global collective action to address the threat, including a proposal for an international treaty on antimicrobial resistance. Further detail and attention is still needed to recognize and measure trends in resistance on the international level; the idea of a global tracking system has been suggested but implementation has yet to occur. A system of this nature would provide insight to areas of high resistance as well as information necessary for evaluating programs, introducing interventions and other changes made to fight or reverse antibiotic resistance.

== One Health approach ==
Antimicrobial resistance (AMR) is commonly described within a One Health framework, which emphasizes the interconnected relationships between human health, animal health, and the environment. Antimicrobial use in clinical medicine, veterinary practice, and agriculture has been associated with the selection and spread of resistant microorganisms across these sectors.

Research indicates that resistant bacteria and antimicrobial resistance genes can move between humans, animals, and environmental reservoirs through multiple pathways, including food production systems, direct contact, and exposure to contaminated water or soil. These pathways contribute to the persistence and wider dissemination of antimicrobial resistance beyond individual settings.

Environmental sources have been increasingly examined in relation to AMR. Wastewater systems, agricultural runoff, and pharmaceutical residues have been identified as potential reservoirs where resistant microorganisms and resistance genes may persist. Such reservoirs may facilitate ongoing transmission between environmental, animal, and human populations.

Efforts to address AMR within a One Health framework typically involve coordinated strategies across sectors, including antimicrobial stewardship, infection prevention and control, and improvements in sanitation and hygiene. Evidence from systematic reviews suggests that interventions such as farm biosecurity and water, sanitation, and hygiene (WASH) practices may reduce antimicrobial use and contribute to limiting the development and spread of resistance.

=== Duration of antimicrobials ===
Delaying or minimizing the use of antibiotics for certain conditions may help safely reduce their use. Antimicrobial treatment duration should be based on the infection and other health problems a person may have. For many infections once a person has improved there is little evidence that stopping treatment causes more resistance. Some, therefore, feel that stopping early may be reasonable in some cases. Other infections, however, do require long courses regardless of whether a person feels better.

Delaying antibiotics for ailments such as a sore throat and otitis media may have no difference in the rate of complications compared with immediate antibiotics, for example. When treating respiratory tract infections, clinical judgement is required as to the appropriate treatment (delayed or immediate antibiotic use).

=== Monitoring and mapping ===
There are multiple national and international monitoring programs for drug-resistant threats, including methicillin-resistant Staphylococcus aureus (MRSA), vancomycin-resistant S. aureus (VRSA), extended spectrum beta-lactamase (ESBL) producing Enterobacterales, vancomycin-resistant Enterococcus (VRE), and multidrug-resistant Acinetobacter baumannii (MRAB).

ResistanceOpen is an online global map of antimicrobial resistance developed by HealthMap which displays aggregated data on antimicrobial resistance from publicly available and user submitted data. The website can display data for a 25 miles (40 km) radius from a location. Users may submit data from antibiograms for individual hospitals or laboratories. European data is from the EARS-Net (European Antimicrobial Resistance Surveillance Network), part of the ECDC. ResistanceMap is a website by the Center for Disease Dynamics, Economics & Policy and provides data on antimicrobial resistance on a global level.

The WHO's AMR global action plan also recommends antimicrobial resistance surveillance in animals. Initial steps in the EU for establishing the veterinary counterpart EARS-Vet (EARS-Net for veterinary medicine) have been made. AMR data from pets in particular is scarce, but needed to support antibiotic stewardship in veterinary medicine.

A genomic analysis of 791,298 Salmonella enterica isolates in the NCBI Pathogen Detection database found that antimicrobial resistance patterns varied according to the source of the isolates. After adjustment for serovar, geographic location and database submission year, poultry isolates had higher odds of extended-spectrum beta-lactamase (ESBL) carriage than the study's human clinical reference group (adjusted odds ratio 4.03). Tetracycline resistance and mobilized colistin resistance were concentrated in poultry- and swine-associated isolates, while isolates from general aquatic environments showed negative associations across the resistance classes examined.

By comparison, there is a lack of national and international monitoring programs for antifungal resistance.

=== Limiting antimicrobial use in humans ===
Antimicrobial stewardship programmes appear useful in reducing rates of antimicrobial resistance. The antimicrobial stewardship program will also provide pharmacists with the knowledge to educate patients that antibiotics will not work for a virus for example.

Excessive antimicrobial use has become one of the top contributors to the evolution of antimicrobial resistance. Since the beginning of the antimicrobial era, antimicrobials have been used to treat a wide range of infectious diseases. Overuse of antimicrobials has become the primary cause of rising levels of antimicrobial resistance. Prescribers are willing to prescribe antimicrobials to individuals who believe that antimicrobials can cure nearly all illnesses, including viral infections like the common cold. In an analysis of drug prescriptions, 36% of individuals with a cold or an upper respiratory infection (both usually viral in origin) were given prescriptions for antibiotics. These prescriptions increase the risk of further evolution of antibiotic resistant bacteria. Using antimicrobials without prescription is another driving force leading to the overuse of antibiotics to self-treat diseases like the common cold, cough, fever, and dysentery resulting in an epidemic of antibiotic resistance in countries like Bangladesh, risking its spread around the globe. Introducing strict antibiotic stewardship in the outpatient setting to reduce inappropriate prescribing of antibiotics may reduce the emerging bacterial resistance.

The WHO AWaRe (Access, Watch, Reserve) guidance and antibiotic book has been introduced to guide antibiotic choice for the 30 most common infections in adults and children to reduce inappropriate prescribing in primary care and hospitals. Narrow-spectrum antibiotics are preferred due to their lower resistance potential, and broad-spectrum antibiotics are only recommended for people with more severe symptoms. Some antibiotics are more likely to confer resistance, so are kept as reserve antibiotics in the AWaRe book.

Various diagnostic strategies have been employed to prevent the overuse of antifungal therapy in the clinic, proving a safe alternative to empirical antifungal therapy, and thus underpinning antifungal stewardship schemes.

==== At the hospital level ====
Antimicrobial stewardship teams in hospitals are encouraging optimal use of antimicrobials. The goals of antimicrobial stewardship are to help practitioners pick the right drug at the right dose and duration of therapy while preventing misuse and minimizing the development of resistance. Stewardship interventions may reduce the length of stay by an average of slightly over 1 day while not increasing the risk of death. Dispensing the exact number of antibiotic pharmaceutical units necessary to complete an ongoing treatment can reduce excess antibiotics.

A 2026 systematic review of 73 studies examined arthropod-mediated pathogen transmission in hospitals. Research indicates that cockroaches, flies, and ants frequently harbor multidrug-resistant bacteria, fungi, and viruses. While direct causality is difficult to prove, genetic evidence links these pests to hospital-associated infections.

==== At the primary care level ====
Given the volume of care provided in primary care (general practice), recent strategies have focused on reducing unnecessary antimicrobial prescribing in this setting. Simple interventions, such as written information explaining when taking antibiotics is not necessary, for example in common infections of the upper respiratory tract, have been shown to reduce antibiotic prescribing. Various tools are also available to help professionals decide if prescribing antimicrobials is necessary.

Parental expectations, driven by the worry for their children's health, can influence how often children are prescribed antibiotics. Parents often rely on their clinician for advice and reassurance. However a lack of plain language information and not having adequate time for consultation negatively impacts this relationship. In effect parents often rely on past experiences in their expectations rather than reassurance from the clinician. Adequate time for consultation and plain language information can help parents make informed decisions and avoid unnecessary antibiotic use.

The prescriber should closely adhere to the five rights of drug administration: the right patient, the right drug, the right dose, the right route, and the right time. Microbiological samples should be taken for culture and sensitivity testing before treatment when indicated and treatment potentially changed based on the susceptibility report. Health workers and pharmacists can help tackle antibiotic resistance by: enhancing infection prevention and control; only prescribing and dispensing antibiotics when they are truly needed; prescribing and dispensing the right antibiotic(s) to treat the illness. A unit dose system implemented in community pharmacies can also reduce antibiotic leftovers at households. Despite these, written guideline intervention for prescriber to do history taking and provision of advice and knowledge of pharmacists and non‐pharmacists may not reduce the sales of non‐prescription antimicrobial drugs in community pharmacies, drugstores, and other medicine outlets.

==== At the individual level ====
People can help tackle resistance by using antibiotics only when prescribed for a bacterial infection as well as completing the full treatment course, never sharing medication with others, and using proper disposal methods for excess drugs. Basic hygiene practices also help prevent the spread of bacteria.

==== Countries ====
- The Netherlands has the lowest rate of antibiotic prescribing in the OECD, at a rate of 11.4 defined daily doses (DDD) per 1,000 people per day in 2011. DDD is a statistical measure of drug consumption, defined by the World Health Organization (WHO).

• Germany and Sweden also have lower prescribing rates, with Sweden's rate having been declining since 2007.
• Greece, France and Belgium have high prescribing rates.

=== Water, sanitation, hygiene ===
Infectious disease control through improved water, sanitation and hygiene (WASH) infrastructure needs to be included in the antimicrobial resistance (AMR) agenda. The "Interagency Coordination Group on Antimicrobial Resistance" stated in 2018 that "the spread of pathogens through unsafe water results in a high burden of gastrointestinal disease, increasing even further the need for antibiotic treatment." This is particularly a problem in developing countries where the spread of infectious diseases caused by inadequate WASH standards is a major driver of antibiotic demand. Growing usage of antibiotics together with persistent infectious disease levels have led to a dangerous cycle in which reliance on antimicrobials increases while the efficacy of drugs diminishes. The proper use of infrastructure for water, sanitation and hygiene (WASH) can result in a 47–72 percent decrease of diarrhea cases treated with antibiotics depending on the type of intervention and its effectiveness. A reduction of the diarrhea disease burden through improved infrastructure would result in large decreases in the number of diarrhea cases treated with antibiotics. This was estimated as ranging from 5 million in Brazil to up to 590 million in India by the year 2030. The strong link between increased consumption and resistance indicates that this will directly mitigate the accelerating spread of AMR. Sanitation and water for all by 2030 is Goal Number 6 of the Sustainable Development Goals.

An increase in hand washing compliance by hospital staff results in decreased rates of resistant organisms.

Water supply and sanitation infrastructure in health facilities offer opportunities for combatting AMR, and investment should be increased. There is much room for improvement: WHO and UNICEF estimated in 2015 that 38% of health facilities did not have a source of water, nearly 19% had no toilets and 35% had no water and soap or alcohol-based hand rub for handwashing.

=== Industrial wastewater treatment ===
Manufacturers of antimicrobials need to improve the treatment of their wastewater (by using industrial wastewater treatment processes) to reduce the release of residues into the environment.

=== Limiting antimicrobial use in animals and farming ===
It is established that the use of antibiotics in animal husbandry can give rise to AMR resistances in bacteria found in food animals to the antibiotics being administered (through injections or medicated feeds). For this reason only antimicrobials that are deemed "not-clinically relevant" are used in these practices.

Unlike resistance to antibacterials, antifungal resistance can be driven by arable farming, currently there is no regulation on the use of similar antifungal classes in agriculture and the clinic.

Recent studies have shown that the prophylactic use of "non-priority" or "non-clinically relevant" antimicrobials in feeds can potentially, under certain conditions, lead to co-selection of environmental AMR bacteria with resistance to medically important antibiotics. The possibility for co-selection of AMR resistances in the food chain pipeline may have far-reaching implications for human health.

==== Country examples ====
===== Europe =====
In 1997, European Union health ministers voted to ban avoparcin and four additional antibiotics used to promote animal growth in 1999. In 2006, a ban on the use of antibiotics in European feed, with the exception of two antibiotics in poultry feeds, became effective. In Scandinavia, there is evidence that the ban has led to a lower prevalence of antibiotic resistance in (nonhazardous) animal bacterial populations. As of 2004, several European countries established a decline of antimicrobial resistance in humans through limiting the use of antimicrobials in agriculture and food industries without jeopardizing animal health or economic cost.

===== United States =====
The United States Department of Agriculture (USDA) and the Food and Drug Administration (FDA) collect data on antibiotic use in humans and in a more limited fashion in animals. About 80% of antibiotic use in the U.S. is for agriculture purposes, and about 70% of these are medically important. This gives reason for concern about the antibiotic resistance crisis in the U.S. and more reason to monitor it. The FDA first determined in 1977, that there is evidence of emergence of antibiotic-resistant bacterial strains in livestock. The long-established practice of permitting OTC sales of antibiotics (including penicillin and other drugs) to lay animal owners for administration to their own animals nonetheless continued in all states. In 2000, the FDA announced their intention to revoke approval of fluoroquinolone use in poultry production because of substantial evidence linking it to the emergence of fluoroquinolone-resistant Campylobacter infections in humans. Legal challenges from the food animal and pharmaceutical industries delayed the final decision to do so until 2006. Fluroquinolones have been banned from extra-label use in food animals in the USA since 2007. However, they are still used in treatment of companion and exotic animals.

=== Global action plans and awareness ===
At the 79th United Nations General Assembly High-Level Meeting on AMR on 26 September 2024, world leaders approved a political declaration committing to a clear set of targets and actions, including reducing the estimated 4.95 million human deaths associated with bacterial AMR annually by 10% by 2030. The increasing interconnectedness of the world and the fact that new classes of antibiotics have not been developed and approved for 25 years highlight the extent to which antimicrobial resistance is a global health challenge. A global action plan to tackle the growing problem of resistance to antibiotics and other antimicrobial medicines was endorsed at the Sixty-eighth World Health Assembly in May 2015. One of the key objectives of the plan is to improve awareness and understanding of antimicrobial resistance through effective communication, education and training. This global action plan developed by the World Health Organization was created to combat the issue of antimicrobial resistance and was guided by the advice of countries and key stakeholders. The WHO's global action plan is composed of five key objectives that can be targeted through different means, and represents countries coming together to solve a major problem that can have future health consequences. These objectives are as follows:

- improve awareness and understanding of antimicrobial resistance through effective communication, education and training.
- strengthen the knowledge and evidence base through surveillance and research.
- reduce the incidence of infection through effective sanitation, hygiene and infection prevention measures.
- optimize the use of antimicrobial medicines in human and animal health.
- develop the economic case for sustainable investment that takes account of the needs of all countries and to increase investment in new medicines, diagnostic tools, vaccines and other interventions.

Steps towards progress

- React based in Sweden has produced informative material on AMR for the general public.
- Videos are being produced for the general public to generate interest and awareness.
- The Irish Department of Health published a National Action Plan on Antimicrobial Resistance in October 2017. The Strategy for the Control of Antimicrobial Resistance in Ireland (SARI), Iaunched in 2001 developed Guidelines for Antimicrobial Stewardship in Hospitals in Ireland in conjunction with the Health Protection Surveillance Centre, these were published in 2009. Following their publication a public information campaign 'Action on Antibiotics' was launched to highlight the need for a change in antibiotic prescribing. Despite this, antibiotic prescribing remains high with variance in adherence to guidelines.
- The United Kingdom published a 20-year vision for antimicrobial resistance that sets out the goal of containing and controlling AMR by 2040. The vision is supplemented by a 5-year action plan running from 2019 to 2024, building on the previous action plan (2013–2018).

==== Antibiotic Awareness Week ====
The World Health Organization has promoted the first World Antibiotic Awareness Week running from 16 to 22 November 2015. The aim of the week is to increase global awareness of antibiotic resistance. It also wants to promote the correct usage of antibiotics across all fields to prevent further instances of antibiotic resistance.

World Antibiotic Awareness Week has been held every November since 2015. For 2017, the Food and Agriculture Organization of the United Nations (FAO), the World Health Organization (WHO) and the World Organisation for Animal Health (OIE) are together calling for responsible use of antibiotics in humans and animals to reduce the emergence of antibiotic resistance.

United Nations

In 2016, the Secretary-General of the United Nations convened the Interagency Coordination Group (IACG) on Antimicrobial Resistance. The IACG worked with international organizations and experts in human, animal, and plant health to create a plan to fight antimicrobial resistance. Their report released in April 2019 focuses on the seriousness of antimicrobial resistance and the threat it poses to world health. It suggests five recommendations for member states to follow to tackle this increasing threat. The IACG recommendations are as follows:

- Accelerate progress in countries
- Innovate to secure the future
- Collaborate for more effective action
- Invest for a sustainable response
- Strengthen accountability and global governance

=== One Health approach ===
The One Health approach recognizes that human, animal, and environmental health are interconnected in the development and spread of antimicrobial resistance (AMR). Key strategies include:

==== Integrated surveillance ====
- Monitoring antibiotic use and resistance trends across human medicine, agriculture, and environmental sectors.
- For example, 73% of the world's antibiotics are used in livestock, often for non-therapeutic purposes like growth promotion.

==== Policy interventions ====
- Banning non-therapeutic antibiotics in agriculture (e.g., European Union's 2006 growth promoter ban).
- Incentivizing development of new antibiotics and alternatives (e.g., vaccines, bacteriophages).

==== Environmental mitigation ====
- Reducing pharmaceutical waste in water systems and soil through improved waste management.
- Addressing resistance genes in wastewater from hospitals, farms, and drug manufacturing sites.

== Mechanisms and organisms ==
=== Bacteria ===
Diagram depicting antibiotic resistance through alteration of the antibiotic's target site, modeled after MRSA's resistance to penicillin. Beta-lactam antibiotics permanently inactivate PBP enzymes, which are essential for bacterial life, by permanently binding to their active sites. MRSA, however, expresses a PBP that does not allow the antibiotic into its active site.

The five main mechanisms by which bacteria exhibit resistance to antibiotics are:

1. Drug inactivation or modification: for example, enzymatic deactivation of penicillin G in some penicillin-resistant bacteria through the production of β-lactamases. Drugs may also be chemically modified through the addition of functional groups by transferase enzymes. For example, acetylation, phosphorylation, or adenylation are resistance mechanisms to aminoglycosides. Acetylation is the most common and can affect a number of drug classes.
2. Alteration of target- or binding site: for example, alteration of PBP—the binding target site of penicillins—in MRSA and other penicillin-resistant bacteria. Another protective mechanism found among bacterial species is ribosomal protection proteins. These proteins protect the bacterial cell from antibiotics that target the cell's ribosomes to inhibit protein synthesis. The mechanism involves the binding of the ribosomal protection proteins to the ribosomes of the bacterial cell, which in turn changes its conformational shape. This allows the ribosomes to continue synthesizing proteins essential to the cell while preventing antibiotics from binding to the ribosome to inhibit protein synthesis.
3. Alteration of metabolic pathway: for example, some sulfonamide-resistant bacteria do not require para-aminobenzoic acid (PABA), an important precursor for the synthesis of folic acid and nucleic acids in bacteria inhibited by sulfonamides, instead, like mammalian cells, they turn to using preformed folic acid.
4. Reduced drug accumulation: by decreasing drug permeability or increasing active efflux (pumping out) of the drugs across the cell surface. These multidrug efflux pumps within the cellular membrane of certain bacterial species are used to pump antibiotics out of the cell before they are able to do any damage. They are often activated by a specific substrate associated with an antibiotic, as in fluoroquinolone resistance.
5. Ribosome splitting and recycling: for example, drug-mediated stalling of the ribosome by lincomycin and erythromycin unstalled by a heat shock protein found in Listeria monocytogenes, which is a homologue of HflX from other bacteria. Liberation of the ribosome from the drug allows further translation and consequent resistance to the drug.

A number of mechanisms used by common antibiotics to deal with bacteria and ways by which bacteria become resistant to them

There are several different types of germs that have developed a resistance over time.

The six pathogens causing most deaths associated with resistance are Escherichia coli, Staphylococcus aureus, Klebsiella pneumoniae, Streptococcus pneumoniae, Acinetobacter baumannii, and Pseudomonas aeruginosa. They were responsible for 929,000 deaths attributable to resistance and 3.57 million deaths associated with resistance in 2019.

Penicillinase-producing Neisseria gonorrhoeae developed a resistance to penicillin in 1976. Another example is Azithromycin-resistant Neisseria gonorrhoeae, which developed a resistance to azithromycin in 2011.

In gram-negative bacteria, plasmid-mediated resistance genes produce proteins that can bind to DNA gyrase, protecting it from the action of quinolones. Finally, mutations at key sites in DNA gyrase or topoisomerase IV can decrease their binding affinity to quinolones, decreasing the drug's effectiveness.

Some bacteria are naturally resistant to certain antibiotics; for example, gram-negative bacteria are resistant to most β-lactam antibiotics due to the presence of β-lactamase. Antibiotic resistance can also be acquired as a result of either genetic mutation or horizontal gene transfer. Although mutations are rare, with spontaneous mutations in the pathogen genome occurring at a rate of about 1 in 10^{5} to 1 in 10^{8} per chromosomal replication, Bacteria reproduce at a high rate, lifespans and production of new generations can be on a timescale of mere hours. A new (de novo) mutation in a parent cell can quickly become an inherited mutation of widespread prevalence, resulting in the microevolution of a fully resistant colony. However, chromosomal mutations also confer a cost of fitness. For example, a ribosomal mutation may protect a bacterial cell by changing the binding site of an antibiotic but may result in slower growth rate. Moreover, some adaptive mutations can propagate not only through inheritance but also through horizontal gene transfer.

The most common mechanism of horizontal gene transfer is the transferring of plasmids carrying antibiotic resistance genes between bacteria of the same or different species via conjugation. However, bacteria can also acquire resistance through transformation, as in Streptococcus pneumoniae uptaking of naked fragments of extracellular DNA that contain antibiotic resistance genes to streptomycin, through transduction, as in the bacteriophage-mediated transfer of tetracycline resistance genes between strains of S. pyogenes, or through gene transfer agents, which are particles produced by the host cell that resemble bacteriophage structures and are capable of transferring DNA.

Antibiotic resistance can be introduced artificially into a microorganism through laboratory protocols, sometimes used as a selectable marker to examine the mechanisms of gene transfer or to identify individuals that absorbed a piece of DNA that included the resistance gene and another gene of interest.

Recent findings show no necessity of large populations of bacteria for the appearance of antibiotic resistance. Small populations of Escherichia coli in an antibiotic gradient can become resistant. Any heterogeneous environment with respect to nutrient and antibiotic gradients may facilitate antibiotic resistance in small bacterial populations. Researchers hypothesize that the mechanism of resistance evolution is based on four SNP mutations in the genome of E. coli produced by the gradient of antibiotic.

In one study, which has implications for space microbiology, a non-pathogenic strain E. coli MG1655 was exposed to trace levels of the broad spectrum antibiotic chloramphenicol, under simulated microgravity (LSMMG, or Low Shear Modeled Microgravity) over 1000 generations. The adapted strain acquired resistance to not only chloramphenicol, but also cross-resistance to other antibiotics; this was in contrast to the observation on the same strain, which was adapted to over 1000 generations under LSMMG, but without any antibiotic exposure; the strain in this case did not acquire any such resistance. Thus, irrespective of where they are used, the use of an antibiotic would likely result in persistent resistance to that antibiotic, as well as cross-resistance to other antimicrobials.

In recent years, the emergence and spread of β-lactamases called carbapenemases has become a major health crisis. One such carbapenemase is New Delhi metallo-beta-lactamase 1 (NDM-1), an enzyme that makes bacteria resistant to a broad range of beta-lactam antibiotics. The most common bacteria that make this enzyme are gram-negative such as E. coli and Klebsiella pneumoniae, but the gene for NDM-1 can spread from one strain of bacteria to another by horizontal gene transfer.

=== Viruses ===
Specific antiviral drugs are used to treat some viral infections. These drugs prevent viruses from reproducing by inhibiting essential stages of the virus's replication cycle in infected cells. Antivirals are used to treat HIV, hepatitis B, hepatitis C, influenza, herpes viruses including varicella zoster virus, cytomegalovirus and Epstein–Barr virus. With each virus, some strains have become resistant to the administered drugs.

Antiviral drugs typically target key components of viral reproduction; for example, oseltamivir targets influenza neuraminidase,while guanosine analogs inhibit viral DNA polymerase. Resistance to antivirals is thus acquired through mutations in the genes that encode the protein targets of the drugs.

Resistance to HIV antivirals is problematic, and even multi-drug resistant strains have evolved. One source of resistance is that many current HIV drugs, including NRTIs and NNRTIs, target reverse transcriptase; however, HIV-1 reverse transcriptase is highly error prone and thus mutations conferring resistance arise rapidly. Resistant strains of the HIV virus emerge rapidly if only one antiviral drug is used. Using three or more drugs together, termed combination therapy, has helped to control this problem, but new drugs are needed because of the continuing emergence of drug-resistant HIV strains.

=== Fungi ===
Infections by fungi are a cause of high morbidity and mortality in immunocompromised persons, such as those with HIV/AIDS, tuberculosis or receiving chemotherapy. The fungi Candida, Cryptococcus neoformans and Aspergillus fumigatus cause most of these infections and antifungal resistance occurs in all of them. Multidrug resistance in fungi is increasing because of the widespread use of antifungal drugs to treat infections in immunocompromised individuals and the use of some agricultural antifungals. Antifungal resistant disease is associated with increased mortality.

Some fungi (for example, Candida krusei and fluconazole) exhibit intrinsic resistance to certain antifungal drugs or classes, whereas some species develop antifungal resistance to external pressures. Antifungal resistance is a One Health concern, driven by multiple extrinsic factors, including overuse of fungicides, clinical antifungals, environmental change and host factors.

In the USA fluconazole-resistant Candida species and azole resistance in Aspergillus fumigatus have been highlighted as a growing threat.

20 species of Candida can cause candidiasis infection, the most common of which is Candida albicans. Candida yeasts normally inhabit the skin and mucous membranes without causing infection. However, overgrowth of Candida can lead to candidiasis. Some Candida species (e.g. Candida glabrata) are becoming resistant to first-line and second-line antifungal agents such as echinocandins and azoles.

The emergence of Candida auris as a potential human pathogen that sometimes exhibits multi-class antifungal drug resistance is concerning and has been associated with several outbreaks. The WHO has released a priority fungal pathogen list, including pathogens with antifungal resistance.

The identification of antifungal resistance is undermined by limited classical diagnosis of infection, where a culture is lacking, preventing susceptibility testing. National and international surveillance schemes for fungal disease and antifungal resistance are limited, hampering the understanding of the disease burden and associated resistance. The application of molecular testing to identify genetic markers associating with resistance may improve the identification of antifungal resistance, but the diversity of mutations associated with resistance is increasing across the fungal species causing infection. In addition, a number of resistance mechanisms depend on up-regulation of selected genes (for instance reflux pumps) rather than defined mutations that are amenable to molecular detection.

Due to the limited number of antifungals in clinical use and the increasing global incidence of antifungal resistance, using the existing antifungals in combination might be beneficial in some cases but further research is needed. Similarly, other approaches that might help to combat the emergence of antifungal resistance could rely on the development of host-directed therapies such as immunotherapy or vaccines.

=== Parasites ===
The protozoan parasites that cause the diseases malaria, trypanosomiasis, toxoplasmosis, cryptosporidiosis and leishmaniasis are important human pathogens.

Malarial parasites that are resistant to the drugs that are currently available to infections are common and this has led to increased efforts to develop new drugs. Resistance to recently developed drugs such as artemisinin has also been reported. The problem of drug resistance in malaria has driven efforts to develop vaccines.

Trypanosomes are parasitic protozoa that cause African trypanosomiasis and Chagas disease (American trypanosomiasis). There are no vaccines to prevent these infections so drugs such as pentamidine and suramin, benznidazole and nifurtimox are used to treat infections. These drugs are effective but infections caused by resistant parasites have been reported.

Leishmaniasis is caused by protozoa and is a public health problem in sub-tropical and tropical countries. Drug resistance has "become a major concern". The preferred treatment for leishmaniasis regionally; liposomal amphotericin B is used in the Mediterranean basin and pentavalent antimonials are more commonly used in Africa, South America, Bangladesh, India, and Nepal. Resistance to antibiotics in Leishmania is a relatively recent phenomena. The first reported instance of resistance to antimonials was reported in India in the 1980s.

=== Global and genomic data ===
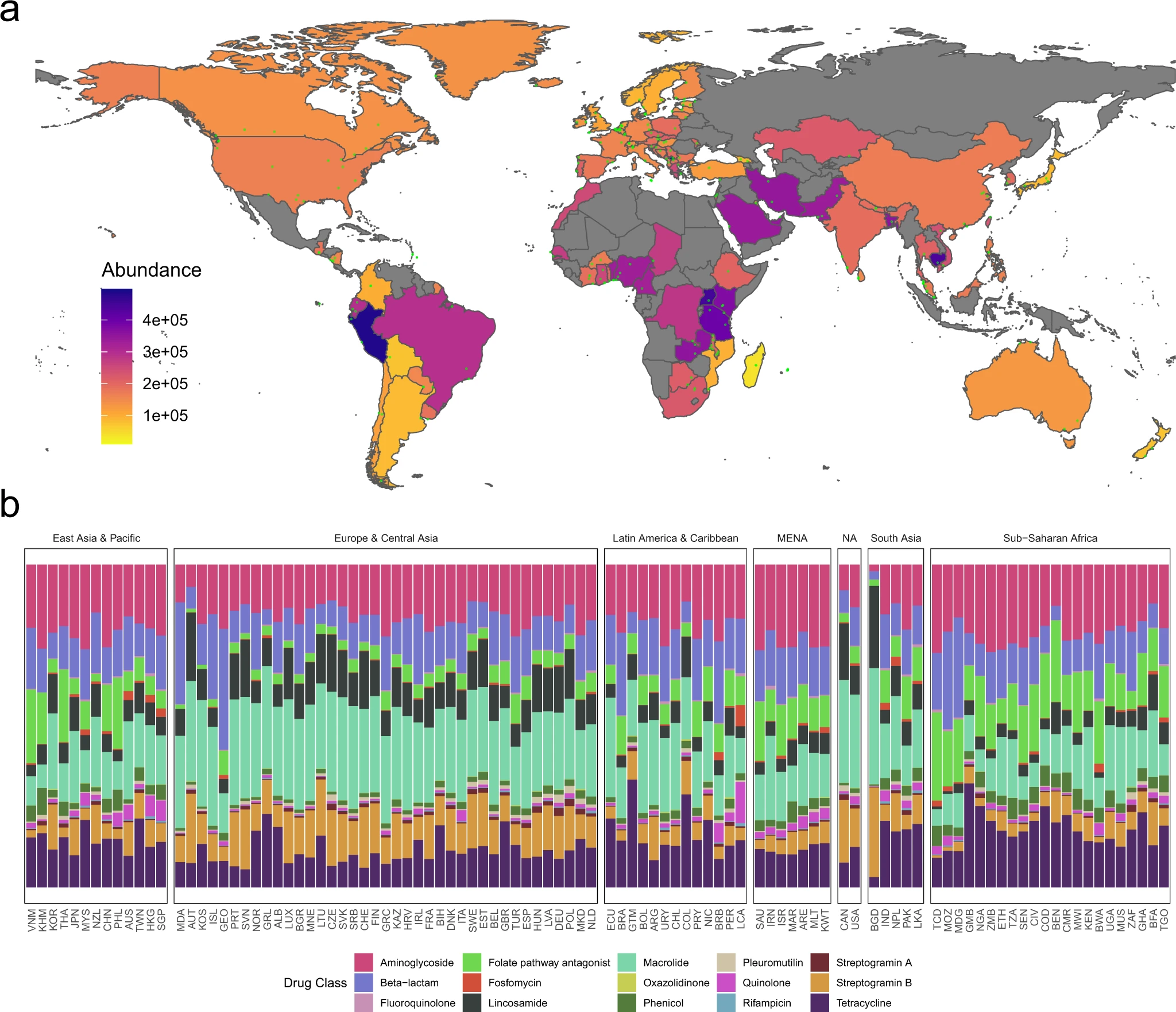
The global 'resistome' based on sewage-based monitoring

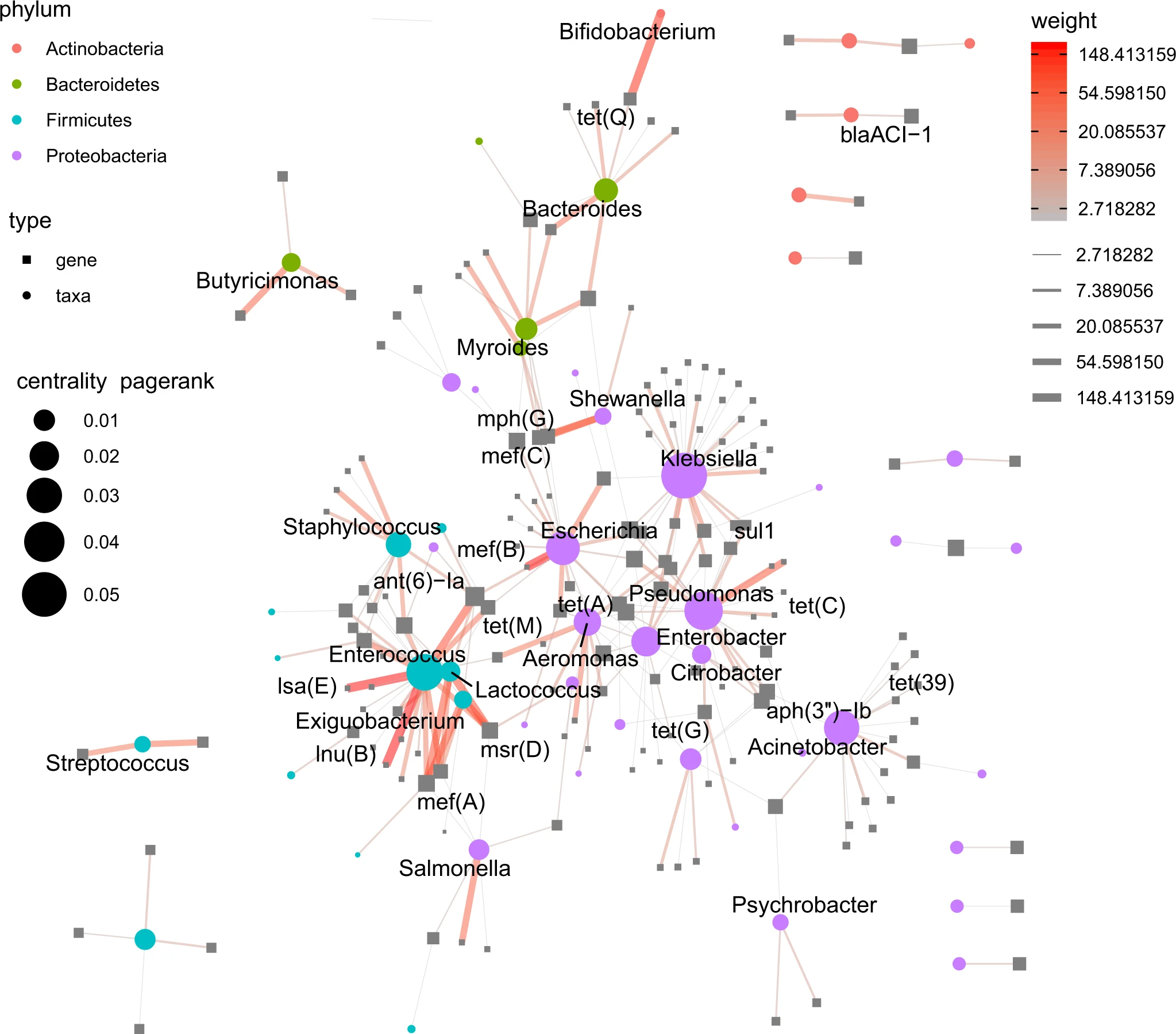
Gene-sharing network between bacterial genera

In 2022, genomic epidemiologists reported results from a global survey of antimicrobial resistance via genomic wastewater-based epidemiology, finding large regional variations, providing maps, and suggesting resistance genes are also passed on between microbial species that are not closely related. The WHO provides the Global Antimicrobial Resistance and Use Surveillance System (GLASS) reports which summarize annual (e.g. 2020's) data on international AMR, also including an interactive dashboard.

== Epidemiology ==
=== United Kingdom ===
Public Health England reported that the total number of antibiotic resistant infections in England rose by 9% from 55,812 in 2017 to 60,788 in 2018, but antibiotic consumption had fallen by 9% from 20.0 to 18.2 defined daily doses per 1,000 inhabitants per day between 2014 and 2018.

=== United States ===
The Centers for Disease Control and Prevention reported that 2.8 million cases and 35,000 deaths of antibiotic resistance have been reported. However, in 2019 overall deaths from antibiotic-resistant infections decreased by 18% and deaths in hospitals decreased by 30%. It was increased to 9.7 million cases and 50,800 deaths in 2026.

The COVID pandemic caused a reversal of much of the progress made on attenuating the effects of antibiotic resistance, resulting in more antibiotic use, more resistant infections, and less data on preventive action. Hospital-onset infections and deaths both increased by 15% in 2020, and significantly higher rates of infections were reported for 4 out of 6 types of healthcare associated infections.

=== India ===
Owing to rampant misuse, over-prescription, and unregulated over-the-counter access to antibiotics, the growth of AMR superbugs has proliferated in India. Pharmacies surveyed by the Karnataka government revealed that 80% of drugs were being sold without a prescription.

A CDC survey revealed that half of inpatients were using "antibiotics from the 'Watch' category of WHO's AWaRe classification, which should be reserved for severe infections."

In 2019, India reported 300,000 deaths because of infections relating to AMR, India also reports the most number of tuberculosis cases resistant to antibiotics.

== History ==
The 1950s to 1970s represented the golden age of antibiotic discovery, where countless new classes of antibiotics were discovered to treat previously incurable diseases such as tuberculosis and syphilis. However, since that time the discovery of new classes of antibiotics has been almost nonexistent, and represents a situation that is especially problematic considering the resiliency of bacteria shown over time and the continued misuse and overuse of antibiotics in treatment.

Already in 1940, in their letter to the editor of Nature journal, Abraham and Chain identified the enzyme penicillinase as responsible for the deactivation of penicillin in penicillin-resistant bacteria. This discovery was the first step in understanding the mechanisms of microbial resistance to β-lactam antibiotics. The phenomenon of antimicrobial resistance caused by overuse of antibiotics was predicted as early as 1945 by Alexander Fleming who said "The time may come when penicillin can be bought by anyone in the shops. Then there is the danger that the ignorant man may easily under-dose himself and by exposing his microbes to nonlethal quantities of the drug make them resistant." Without the creation of new and stronger antibiotics an era where common infections and minor injuries can kill, and where complex procedures such as surgery and chemotherapy become too risky, is a very real possibility. Antimicrobial resistance can lead to epidemics of enormous proportions if preventive actions are not taken. In this day and age current antimicrobial resistance leads to longer hospital stays, higher medical costs, and increased mortality.

== Society and culture ==
=== Policy ===
Since the mid-1980s pharmaceutical companies have invested in medications for cancer or chronic disease that have greater potential to make money and have "de-emphasized or dropped development of antibiotics". On 20 January 2016 at the World Economic Forum, "80 pharmaceutical and diagnostic companies" called for "transformational commercial models" at an international level to spur research and development on antibiotics and on the use of diagnostic tests. A number of countries are considering or implementing delinked payment models for new antimicrobials whereby payment is based on value rather than volume of drug sales. This offers the opportunity to pay for valuable new drugs even if they are reserved for use in relatively rare drug resistant infections.

=== Legal frameworks ===
Some global health scholars have argued that a global, legal framework is needed to prevent and control antimicrobial resistance. For instance, binding global policies could be used to create antimicrobial use standards, regulate antibiotic marketing, and strengthen global surveillance systems. Ensuring compliance of involved parties is a challenge. Global antimicrobial resistance policies could take lessons from the environmental sector by adopting strategies that have made international environmental agreements successful in the past such as: sanctions for non-compliance, assistance for implementation, majority vote decision-making rules, an independent scientific panel, and specific commitments.

==== United States ====
For the United States 2016 budget, U.S. president Barack Obama proposed to nearly double the amount of federal funding to "combat and prevent" antibiotic resistance to $1.2 billion. Many international funding agencies like USAID, DFID, Sida and Gates Foundation have pledged money for developing strategies to counter antimicrobial resistance.

On 27 March 2015, the White House released a plan to address the increasing need for agencies to combat the rise of antibiotic-resistant bacteria. The Task Force for Combating Antibiotic-Resistant Bacteria developed The National Action Plan for Combating Antibiotic-Resistant Bacteria with the intent of providing a roadmap to guide the US in the antibiotic resistance challenge and with hopes of saving many lives. This plan outlines steps taken by the Federal government over the next five years needed to prevent and contain outbreaks of antibiotic-resistant infections; maintain the efficacy of antibiotics already on the market; and to help to develop future diagnostics, antibiotics, and vaccines.

The Action Plan was developed around five goals with focuses on strengthening health care, public health veterinary medicine, agriculture, food safety and research, and manufacturing. These goals, as listed by the White House, are as follows:

- Slow the Emergence of Resistant Bacteria and Prevent the Spread of Resistant Infections
- Strengthen National One-Health Surveillance Efforts to Combat Resistance
- Advance Development and use of Rapid and Innovative Diagnostic Tests for Identification and Characterization of Resistant Bacteria
- Accelerate Basic and Applied Research and Development for New Antibiotics, Other Therapeutics, and Vaccines
- Improve International Collaboration and Capacities for Antibiotic Resistance Prevention, Surveillance, Control and Antibiotic Research and Development

The following are goals set to meet by 2020:

- Establishment of antimicrobial programs within acute care hospital settings
- Reduction of inappropriate antibiotic prescription and use by at least 50% in outpatient settings and 20% inpatient settings
- Establishment of State Antibiotic Resistance (AR) Prevention Programs in all 50 states
- Elimination of the use of medically important antibiotics for growth promotion in food-producing animals.

Current Status of AMR in the U.S.

As of 2023, AMR remains a public health threat in the United States. According to the Centers for Disease Control and Prevention's 2023 Report on Antibiotic Resistance Threats, over 2.8 million antibiotic-resistant infections occur in the U.S. each year, leading to at least 35,000 deaths annually. Among the most concerning resistant pathogens are Carbapenem-resistant Enterobacteriaceae (CRE), Methicillin-resistant Staphylococcus aureus (MRSA), and Clostridioides difficile (C. diff), all of which continue to be responsible for severe healthcare-associated infections (HAIs).

The COVID-19 pandemic led to a disruption in healthcare, with an increase in the use of antibiotics during the treatment of viral infections. This rise in antibiotic prescribing, coupled with overwhelmed healthcare systems, contributed to a resurgence in AMR during the pandemic years. A 2021 CDC report identified a sharp increase in HAIs caused by resistant pathogens in COVID-19 patients, a trend that has persisted into 2023. Recent data suggest that although antibiotic use has decreased since the pandemic, some resistant pathogens remain prevalent in healthcare settings.

The CDC has also expanded its Get Ahead of Sepsis campaign in 2023, focusing on raising awareness of AMR's role in sepsis and promoting the judicious use of antibiotics in both healthcare and community settings. This initiative has reached millions through social media, healthcare facilities, and public health outreach, aiming to educate the public on the importance of preventing infections and reducing antibiotic misuse.

Under the administration of Donald J. Trump, severe federal funding cuts in 2025 at the National Institutes of Health (NIH) and many other research entities in the United States are expected to impede progress in combating antimicrobial resistance. Public health experts believe these budget reductions will adversely affect the development of new antibiotics as well as advances in diagnostics and treatment strategies, thus undermining efforts currently underway to address AMR. The Infectious Diseases Society of America (IDSA) is but one organization that has expressed grave concern regarding the negative consequences of such extreme budget measures on antimicrobial stewardship, and, as a result, on global health security overall.

=== Policies ===
According to World Health Organization, policymakers can help tackle resistance by strengthening resistance-tracking and laboratory capacity and by regulating and promoting the appropriate use of medicines. Policymakers and industry can help tackle resistance by: fostering research and development of new tools and promoting cooperation and information sharing among all stakeholders.

=== Policy evaluation ===
Measuring the costs and benefits of strategies to combat AMR is difficult and policies may only have effects in the distant future. In other infectious diseases this problem has been addressed by using mathematical models. More research is needed to understand how AMR develops and spreads so that mathematical modelling can be used to anticipate the likely effects of different policies.

== Further research ==
=== Rapid testing and diagnostics ===
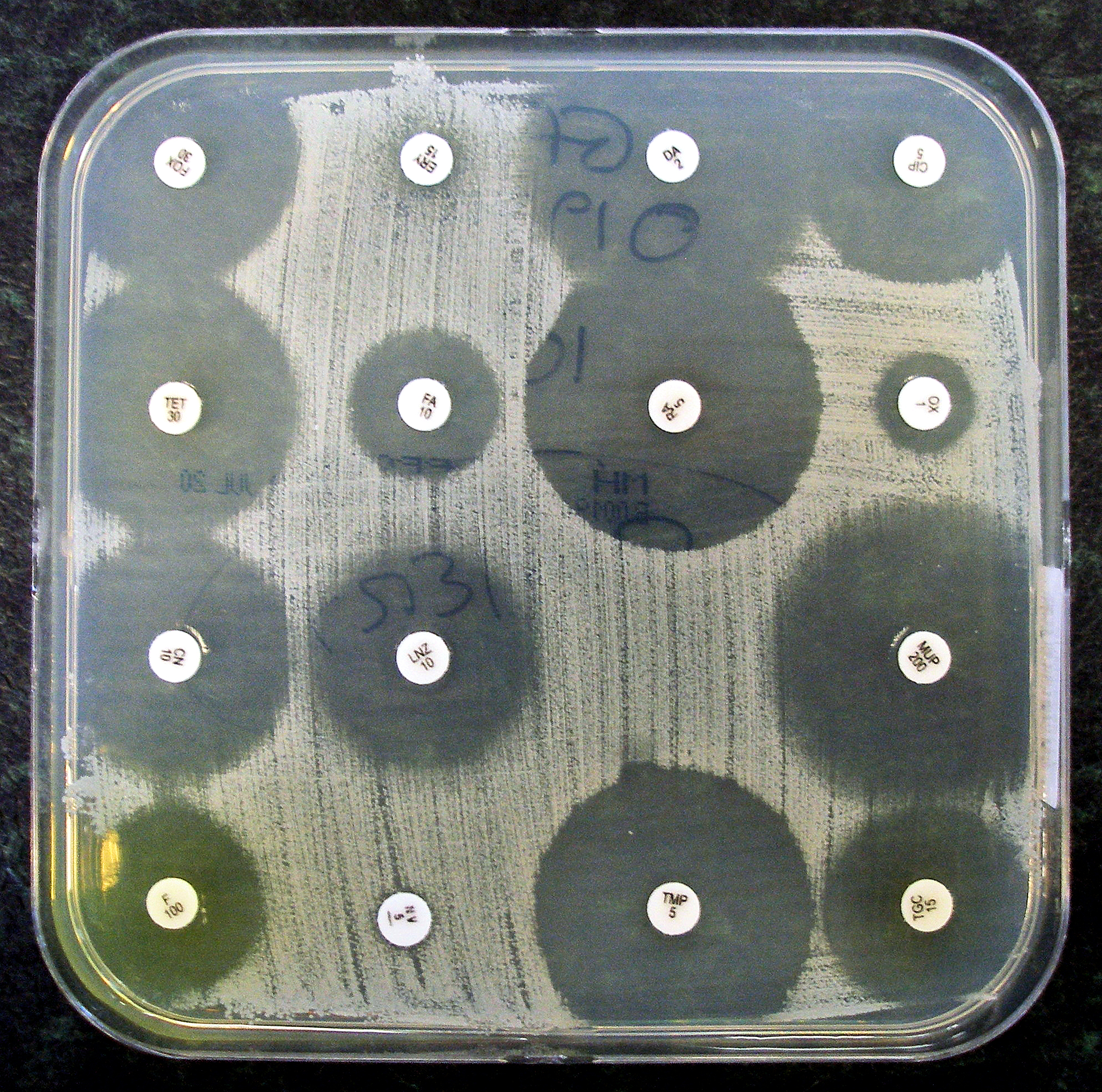
Antimicrobial susceptibility testing: Thin paper discs containing an antibiotic have been placed on an agar plate growing bacteria. Bacteria are not able to grow around antibiotics to which they are sensitive.

Distinguishing infections requiring antibiotics from self-limiting ones is clinically challenging. To guide appropriate use of antibiotics and prevent the evolution and spread of antimicrobial resistance, diagnostic tests that provide clinicians with timely, actionable results are needed.

Acute fever is a common reason for seeking medical care and a major cause of morbidity and mortality. In areas with decreasing malaria incidence, many febrile patients are inappropriately treated for malaria, and in the absence of a simple diagnostic test to identify alternative causes of fever, clinicians presume that a non-malarial febrile illness is most likely a bacterial infection, leading to inappropriate use of antibiotics. Multiple studies have shown that the use of malaria rapid diagnostic tests without reliable tools to distinguish other fever causes has resulted in increased antibiotic use.

Antimicrobial susceptibility testing (AST) can facilitate a precision medicine approach to treatment by helping clinicians to prescribe more effective and targeted antimicrobial therapy. At the same time with traditional phenotypic AST it can take 12 to 48 hours to obtain a result due to the time taken for organisms to grow on/in culture media. Rapid testing, possible from molecular diagnostics innovations, is defined as "being feasible within an 8-h working shift". There are several commercial Food and Drug Administration-approved assays available which can detect AMR genes from a variety of specimen types. Progress has been slow due to a range of reasons including cost and regulation. Genotypic AMR characterisation methods are, however, being increasingly used in combination with machine learning algorithms in research to help better predict phenotypic AMR from organism genotype.

Optical techniques such as phase contrast microscopy in combination with single-cell analysis are another powerful method to monitor bacterial growth. In 2017, scientists from Uppsala University in Sweden published a method that applies principles of microfluidics and cell tracking, to monitor bacterial response to antibiotics in less than 30 minutes overall manipulation time. This invention was awarded the 8M£ Longitude Prize on AMR in 2024. Recently, this platform has been advanced by coupling microfluidic chip with optical tweezing to isolate bacteria with altered phenotype directly from the analytical matrix.

Rapid diagnostic methods have also been trialled as antimicrobial stewardship interventions to influence the healthcare drivers of AMR. Serum procalcitonin measurement has been shown to reduce mortality rate, antimicrobial consumption and antimicrobial-related side-effects in patients with respiratory infections, but impact on AMR has not yet been demonstrated. Similarly, point of care serum testing of the inflammatory biomarker C-reactive protein has been shown to influence antimicrobial prescribing rates in this patient cohort, but further research is required to demonstrate an effect on rates of AMR. Clinical investigation to rule out bacterial infections are often done for patients with pediatric acute respiratory infections. Currently it is unclear if rapid viral testing affects antibiotic use in children.

=== Vaccines ===
Vaccines are an essential part of the response to reduce AMR as they prevent infections, reduce the use and overuse of antimicrobials, and slow the emergence and spread of drug-resistant pathogens. Microorganisms usually do not develop resistance to vaccines because vaccines reduce the spread of the infection and target the pathogen in multiple ways in the same host and possibly in different ways between different hosts. Furthermore, if the use of vaccines increases, there is evidence that antibiotic resistant strains of pathogens will decrease; the need for antibiotics will naturally decrease as vaccines prevent infection before it occurs. A 2024 report by WHO finds that vaccines against 24 pathogens could reduce the number of antibiotics needed by 22% or 2.5 billion DDD every year. If vaccines could be rolled out against all the evaluated pathogens, they could save a third of the hospital costs associated with AMR. Vaccinated people have fewer infections and are protected against potential complications from secondary infections that may need antimicrobial medicines or require admission to hospital. However, there are well documented cases of vaccine resistance, although these are usually much less of a problem than antimicrobial resistance.

Antistaphylococcal vaccines have shown limited efficacy, because of immunological variation between Staphylococcus species, and the limited duration of effectiveness of the antibodies produced. Development and testing of more effective vaccines is underway.

Two registrational trials have evaluated vaccine candidates in active immunization strategies against S. aureus infection. In a phase II trial, a bivalent vaccine of capsular proteins 5 & 8 was tested in 1804 hemodialysis patients with a primary fistula or synthetic graft vascular access. After 40 weeks following vaccination a protective effect was seen against S. aureus bacteremia, but not at 54 weeks following vaccination. Based on these results, a second trial was conducted which failed to show efficacy.

Merck tested V710, a vaccine targeting IsdB, in a blinded randomized trial in patients undergoing median sternotomy. The trial was terminated after a higher rate of multiorgan system failure–related deaths was found in the V710 recipients. Vaccine recipients who developed S. aureus infection were five times more likely to die than control recipients who developed S. aureus infection.

Investigators have suggested that a multiple-antigen vaccine would be more effective, but a lack of biomarkers defining human protective immunity keep these proposals in the logical, but strictly hypothetical arena.

=== Alternating therapy ===
Alternating therapy is a proposed method in which two or three antibiotics are taken in a rotation versus taking just one antibiotic such that bacteria resistant to one antibiotic are killed when the next antibiotic is taken. Studies have found that this method reduces the rate at which antibiotic resistant bacteria emerge in vitro relative to a single drug for the entire duration.

Studies have found that bacteria that evolve antibiotic resistance towards one group of antibiotic may become more sensitive to others. This phenomenon can be used to select against resistant bacteria using an approach termed collateral sensitivity cycling, which has recently been found to be relevant in developing treatment strategies for chronic infections caused by Pseudomonas aeruginosa. Despite its promise, large-scale clinical and experimental studies revealed limited evidence of susceptibility to antibiotic cycling across various pathogens.

=== Development of new drugs ===
Since the discovery of antibiotics, research and development (R&D) efforts have provided new drugs in time to treat bacteria that became resistant to older antibiotics, but in the 2000s there has been concern that development has slowed enough that seriously ill people may run out of treatment options. Another concern is that practitioners may become reluctant to perform routine surgeries because of the increased risk of harmful infection. Backup treatments can have serious side-effects; for example, antibiotics like aminoglycosides (such as amikacin, gentamicin, kanamycin, streptomycin, etc.) used for the treatment of drug-resistant tuberculosis and cystic fibrosis can cause respiratory disorders, deafness and kidney failure.

The potential crisis at hand is the result of a marked decrease in industry research and development. Poor financial investment in antibiotic research has exacerbated the situation. In 2011, Pfizer, one of the last major pharmaceutical companies developing new antibiotics, shut down its primary research effort, citing poor shareholder returns relative to drugs for chronic illnesses. However, small and medium-sized pharmaceutical companies are still active in antibiotic drug research. In particular, apart from classical synthetic chemistry methodologies, researchers have developed a combinatorial synthetic biology platform on single cell level in a high-throughput screening manner to diversify novel lanthipeptides.

In the 5–10 years since 2010, there has been a change in the ways new antimicrobial agents are discovered and developed – principally via the formation of public-private funding initiatives. These include CARB-X, which focuses on nonclinical and early phase development of novel antibiotics, vaccines, rapid diagnostics; Novel Gram Negative Antibiotic (GNA-NOW), which is part of the EU's Innovative Medicines Initiative; and Replenishing and Enabling the Pipeline for Anti-infective Resistance Impact Fund (REPAIR). Later stage clinical development is supported by the AMR Action Fund, which in turn is supported by multiple investors with the aim of developing 2–4 new antimicrobial agents by 2030. The delivery of these trials is facilitated by national and international networks supported by the Clinical Research Network of the National Institute for Health and Care Research (NIHR), European Clinical Research Alliance in Infectious Diseases (ECRAID) and the recently formed ADVANCE-ID, which is a clinical research network based in Asia. The Global Antibiotic Research and Development Partnership (GARDP) is generating new evidence for global AMR threats such as neonatal sepsis, treatment of serious bacterial infections and sexually transmitted infections as well as addressing global access to new and strategically important antibacterial drugs.

The discovery and development of new antimicrobial agents has been facilitated by regulatory advances, which have been principally led by the European Medicines Agency (EMA) and the Food and Drug Administration (FDA). These processes are increasingly aligned although important differences remain and drug developers must prepare separate documents. New development pathways have been developed to help with the approval of new antimicrobial agents that address unmet needs such as the Limited Population Pathway for Antibacterial and Antifungal Drugs (LPAD). These new pathways are required because of difficulties in conducting large definitive phase III clinical trials in a timely way.

Some of the economic impediments to the development of new antimicrobial agents have been addressed by reimbursement schemes that delink payment of antimicrobials from volume-based sales. In the UK, a market entry reward scheme has been pioneered by the National Institute for Clinical Excellence (NICE) whereby an annual subscription fee is paid for use of strategically valuable antimicrobial agents – cefiderocol and ceftazidime-aviabactam are the first agents to be used in this manner and the scheme is potential blueprint for comparable programs in other countries.

The available classes of antifungal drugs are still limited but as of 2021 novel classes of antifungals are being developed and are undergoing various stages of clinical trials to assess performance.

Scientists have started using advanced computational approaches with supercomputers for the development of new antibiotic derivatives to deal with antimicrobial resistance.

=== Biomaterials ===
Using antibiotic-free alternatives in bone infection treatment may help decrease the use of antibiotics and thus antimicrobial resistance. The bone regeneration material bioactive glass S53P4 has shown to effectively inhibit the bacterial growth of up to 50 clinically relevant bacteria including MRSA and MRSE.

=== Rediscovery of ancient treatments ===
Similar to the situation in malaria therapy, where successful treatments based on ancient recipes have been found, there has already been some success in finding and testing ancient drugs and other treatments that are effective against AMR bacteria.

=== Computational community surveillance ===
One of the key tools identified by the WHO and others for the fight against rising antimicrobial resistance is improved surveillance of the spread and movement of AMR genes through different communities and regions. Recent advances in high-throughput DNA sequencing as a result of the Human Genome Project have resulted in the ability to determine the individual microbial genes in a sample. Along with the availability of databases of known antimicrobial resistance genes, such as the Comprehensive Antimicrobial Resistance Database (CARD) and ResFinder, this allows the identification of all the antimicrobial resistance genes within the sample – the so-called "resistome". In doing so, a profile of these genes within a community or environment can be determined, providing information into how antimicrobial resistance is spreading through a population and allowing for the identification of resistance that is of concern.

=== Phage therapy ===
Phage therapy is the therapeutic use of bacteriophages to treat pathogenic bacterial infections. Phage therapy has many potential applications in human medicine as well as dentistry, veterinary science, and agriculture.

Phage therapy relies on the use of naturally occurring bacteriophages to infect and lyse bacteria at the site of infection in a host. Due to current advances in genetics and biotechnology these bacteriophages can possibly be manufactured to treat specific infections. Phages can be bioengineered to target multidrug-resistant bacterial infections, and their use involves the added benefit of preventing the elimination of beneficial bacteria in the human body. Phages destroy bacterial cell walls and membrane through the use of lytic proteins which kill bacteria by making many holes from the inside out. Bacteriophages can even possess the ability to digest the biofilm that many bacteria develop that protect them from antibiotics to effectively infect and kill bacteria. Bioengineering can play a role in creating successful bacteriophages.

Understanding the mutual interactions and evolutions of bacterial and phage populations in the environment of a human or animal body is essential for rational phage therapy.

Bacteriophagics are used against antibiotic resistant bacteria in Georgia (George Eliava Institute) and in one institute in Wrocław, Poland. Bacteriophage cocktails are common drugs sold over the counter in pharmacies in eastern countries. In Belgium, four patients with severe musculoskeletal infections received bacteriophage therapy with concomitant antibiotics. After a single course of phage therapy, no recurrence of infection occurred and no severe side-effects related to the therapy were detected.

== Computational and data analytical methods ==
Analysing AMR data at scale requires dedicated computational approaches, as routine microbiological data from clinical laboratories can be large, heterogeneous, and subject to varying local standards. Several open-source tools have been developed to support this work. The AMR package for R provides functions for standardising and analysing phenotypical resistance data, including interpretation of MIC and disk diffusion results against EUCAST and CLSI breakpoints, and calculation of resistance rates across patient populations.

== See also ==
- Alliance for the Prudent Use of Antibiotics – American non-profit organization
- Anthelmintic resistance – Antiparasitic drugs that expel parasitic worms (helminths) from the body
- Antimicrobial resistance in Australia
- Broad-spectrum antibiotic – Treatment for a wide range of bacteria
- Colonisation resistance – Physiological function of microbiomes
- Drug of last resort – Type of drug
- Genetic engineering – Manipulation of an organism's genome
- Horizontal gene transfer – Transfer of genes from unrelated organisms
- (KPC) antibacterial resistance gene – Class of enzymes
- Multidrug-resistant Gram-negative bacteria – Gram-negative bacteria with resistance to multiple antibiotics
- Multidrug-resistant tuberculosis
- New Delhi metallo-beta-lactamase 1 – Antibiotic resistance enzyme in bacteria
- One Health – Collaborative global initiative
- Persister cells – Dormant, persistent state of a bacterial population
- Resistance-nodulation-cell division superfamily (RND)
- Resistome
