= SmeT =

Transcriptional repressor protein

SmeT is a transcriptional repressor protein of 24.6 kDa, found in the pathogenic bacteria Stenotrophomonas maltophilia. SmeT is responsible for the regulation of the Multidrug Resistance (MDR) efflux pump, SmeDEF, that gives the bacteria resistance to several antibiotics including macrolides, TMP/SMX, tetracycline, chloramphenicol, quinolones, and erythromycin. SmeT is encoded 223 bp upstream of SmeDEF, with just 56 base pairs between their transcription start sites and an overlapping region between the promoters. The production of the SmeT protein downregulates its own transcription, along with that of the efflux pump by sterically hindering the binding of RNA Polymerase to the DNA. SmeDEF was the first MDR pump discovered in the S. maltophilia species. The pump is named by its different parts: SmeE, the transporter itself that spans the plasma membrane, SmeF, the protein on the outer portion of the membrane, and SmeD, a membrane fusion protein. On general purpose media and no selectors, the genes for MDR pumps are typically not expressed, and the repressor is found bound to the DNA. In fact, mutations in SmeT that lead to overexpression of SmeDEF can pose fitness challenges to the bacteria. However, this overexpression has been identified in the bacterium and may pose a threat to our health.

== Origins ==
Though a lot of recent antibiotic resistance in bacteria is due to mutations in genes for repressors such as SmeT, SmeDEF and SmeT are highly conserved within S. maltophilia. S. maltophilia are naturally found colonizing plant roots in water and soil, and SmeT has played an evolutionary role in the survival of the bacteria against plant-produced flavonoids that act as effectors to the repressor. Since many man-made antibiotics are plant products or related derivatives, this evolutionary role of SmeT also contributes to the characteristic resistance to antibiotics by the species. In other words, SmeT and SmeDEF are not recent traits acquired by horizontal gene transfer due to antibiotics but have arisen over time in S. maltophilia due to selective pressures in their natural habitats against plant agents.

== Structure ==
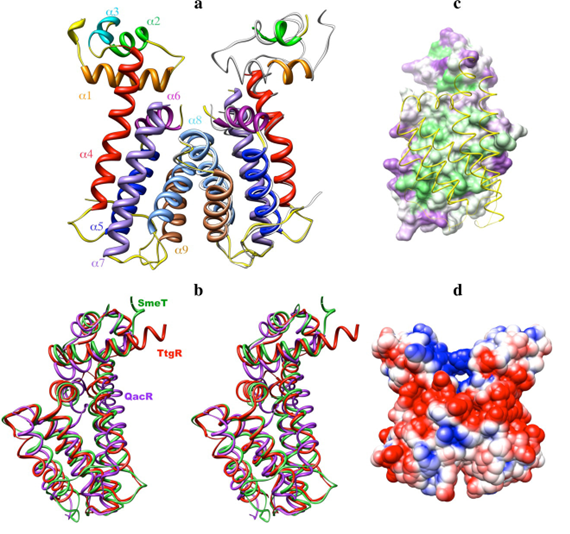
a) Ribbon structure of SmeT b) Comparison of SmeT to QacR and TgtR c) Conserved hydrophobic regions labeled in green d) Electrostatic potential of SmeT, with positive regions in blue and negative regions in red

SmeT is a homodimer, like many other proteins in the TetR family that the repressor is categorized in. The rmsd for the subunits is 0.811Å, a sign of their structural similarities. SmeT is made of 9 helices: α1, α2 and α3 and the beginning of α4 are responsible for DNA binding in the N-terminus domain, while the rest of α4, α5, α6, and α7 form the effector binding pocket in the C-terminus. α8 and α9 allow the dimerization of the protein. Hydrophobic interactions, Van der Waals forces, salt bridges, and hydrogen bonding between amino acid residues contribute to the stability of the N-terminus and its connection to the C-terminus. These interactions also contribute to the recognition of an effector by the protein since the subunits must interact in the ways mentioned above to induce conformational changes. On the surface of the protein, in the effector binding site, and in the DNA binding site, there are hydrophobic residues of amino acids. The surface of the protein is negatively charged, while the N-terminus has an overall positive charge. SmeT shows extended N and C termini and a much smaller binding site, about 630Å, compared to that of other proteins in the same family. Six amino acid residues that line the ligand pocket have multiple conformations, which allow different effectors in different orientations to bind to the protein, contributing to the range of effectors that the repressor is induced by.

== Mechanism ==
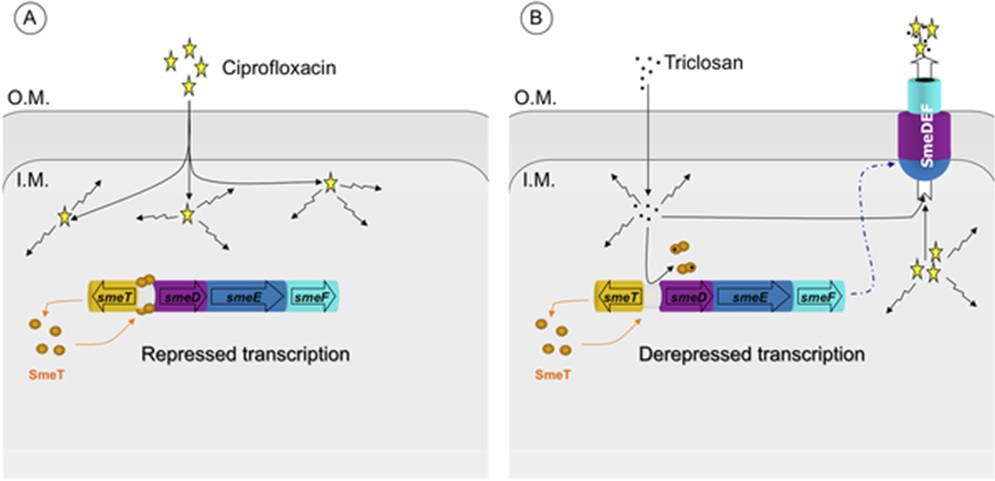
Model of SmeT repression mechanism with ciprofloxacin and triclosan.

SmeT binds to an operator region, a 28 bp pseudopalindromic site found in many Gram-negative bacteria, that overlaps both the promoter regions of SmeT and SmeDEF. This site is just upstream to the SmeD transcription start site. The sequence consists of 2 inverted and overlapping repeats, named IR1 in the coding strand and IR2 in its complement, that 4 SmeT proteins can bind to (2 on each repeat). The sequence TGTATGT in IR1 is necessary for the first homodimer to bind. This is the strongest bond between the dimers and the DNA, and the following homodimer binds to the DNA on the coding strand cooperatively. The K_{m} of the protein for this region is about 1uM. A third homodimer then recognizes a similar sequence on the complementary strand and is stabilized by the interactions already made by the first homodimers to bind to the DNA. The fourth homodimer binds cooperatively. This results in the repression of both genes by the blocking of RNA Polymerase to the DNA.

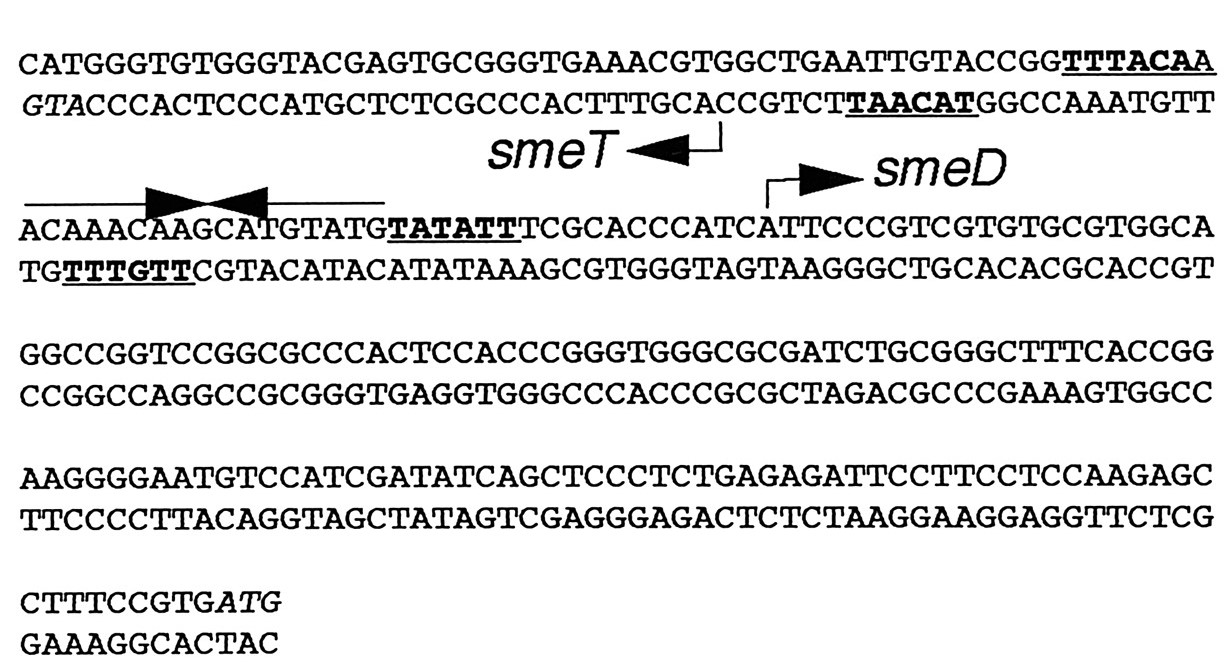
SmeT and SmeDEF transcription start sites and the inverted palindromic sequence

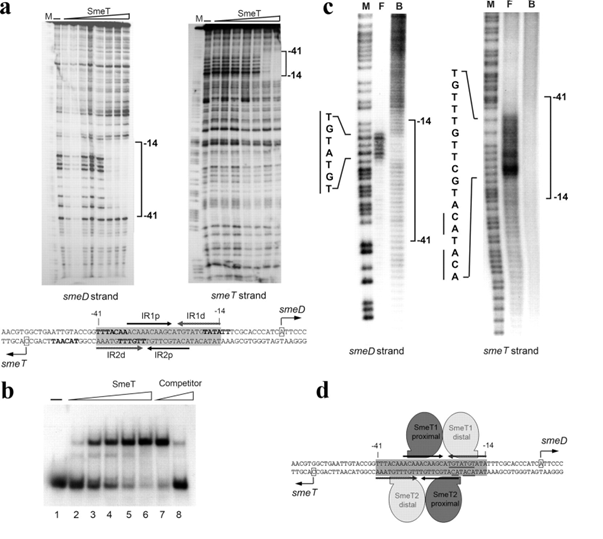
a) DNase footprinting assay showing the binding of SmeT to the pseudopalindromic sequence on its operator b) Gel electrophoresis of SmeT bound to its operator at increasing concentrations of SmeT c) Nucleosides required for SmeT to bind to the DNA d) Model of SmeT binding to DNA

The extension of amino acids on the N-terminus are negatively charged and maintain close interactions with the rest of the positively charged terminus. For DNA, which is negatively charged, to bind to the protein, this extension must not hinder the binding site. This is why, when the effector binds to the protein, one of the characteristic conformational changes is the movement of this extension.

The expression of SmeDEF and SmeT initiates when an effector, such as tetracyclin, bile salts, or triclosan, binds to a pocket in the C-terminus domain, inducing conformational changes in the N-terminus DNA binding motif, stabilizing it. In the case of triclosan, 2 molecules are required to bind to the C-terminus domain in order for this change to occur. This conformation change leads to the release of the repressor from the operator so that expression of SmeDEF and SmeT initiates.

Stabilizing of the N terminus is ultimately what leads to the dissociation of SmeT from the DNA. This region is highly disordered, but upon binding of the effector, new interacting structures are formed between α6 and α7, as well as α1 and α2. This changes the distance between the α3 helices that bind to the DNA, making them about 10Å longer than the grooves in the DNA that the helices bind to.

== Related proteins and family ==
SmeT is a member of the TetR family of tetracycline repressors and is a homodimer. Many of its structural features resemble that of other proteins in the TetR family, such as TgtR and QacR. Proteins of the TetR family have very similar helix-turn-helix DNA binding motifs on the N-terminus, contributing to its function as a repressor. The C-terminus can vary between proteins in the family, which allow for specificity. Though the range of effectors is different for every repressor in the family due to this specificity, most molecules that act as an effector have an aromatic ring structure. The most similar protein in the TetR family to SmeT is TTgR, with an rmsd of 2.5Å for 187 amino acid residues. Other similar proteins include TetR from E.coli and QacR from S.aureus.

SmeT is also classified as a part of the resistance-nodulation-division (RND) class of efflux pumps. Other RND efflux systems found in S. maltophilia are SmeABC, SmeGH, SmeIJK, SmeMN, SmeOP, SmeVWX, and SmeYZ, all contributing to the bacteria's resistance to many agents.

== Applications ==
Mutations in SmeT leading to the inability to down-regulate the expression of SmeDEF has correlated with very high levels of resistance in S. maltophilia to antibiotics. Antibiotics are taken out of the cell by these pumps, unable to affect the bacteria. Mutations in SmeT will not only induce resistance to one class of antibiotics and treatments, but to many, including TMP-SMX that is used to treat a wide variety of bacterial infections. With the heavy everyday use of biocides, selection for resistant S. maltophilia and those with mutations in proteins such as SmeT is highly possible. Biocides, such as triclosan which is specific to SmeDEF, are ingredients in products such as toothpaste, soap, and everyday cleaning supplies. Triclosan in particular reduces the bacteria's sensitivity to ciprofloxacin. Selection for these resistant bacteria could lead to detrimental public health effects.

Other factors can contribute to S. maltophilia's resistance, such as genes for beta lactamases, aminoglycoside amino transferases, erythromycin inactivating enzymes, and other MDR pumps such as SmeABC and SmeC. No matter the combination, resistance of S.maltophilia to antibiotics has been an issue in the health care setting, as infection by the bacteria have typically occurred in hospitals. Strains of S. maltophilia have also been found colonizing in the respiratory tracts of patients with cystic fibrosis, as well as in patients with bacteremia, endocarditis, and cancer.

Sequencing of mutant and wild type genomes for SmeT have shown that a point mutation, Leu166Gln, has been responsible for preventing SmeT from binding to the DNA by changing the folding of the protein, thus leading to overexpression of SmeDEF. The exact mechanism that this occurs is still unknown.

Furthermore, SmeT is an important protein to consider when looking at the use of biocides and antibiotics simultaneously. When S. maltophilia are subjected to biocides, then antibiotics, the biocide enhances the growth of the S. maltophilia. The biocide acts as effector for increasing expression of SmeDEF, making the bacteria highly resistant to antibiotics.

Future research could attempt to find medications that will alter the flexibility of the protein. Studies of TetR family repressor mutants showed that proteins with a mutation leading to unfolding in the N-terminus allowed the repressor to remain bound to the DNA even in the presence of tetracycline. In this way, creating drugs that target the SmeT protein structure may reduce the bacteria's resistance to antibiotics. Further, venturing away from quinolones and developing antibiotics that do not have aromatic ring structure could be another avenue of research. Using multiple antibiotics may be something physicians will soon need to resort to more often as well.
