= Vancomycin-resistant Staphylococcus aureus =

Antibiotic resistant bacteria

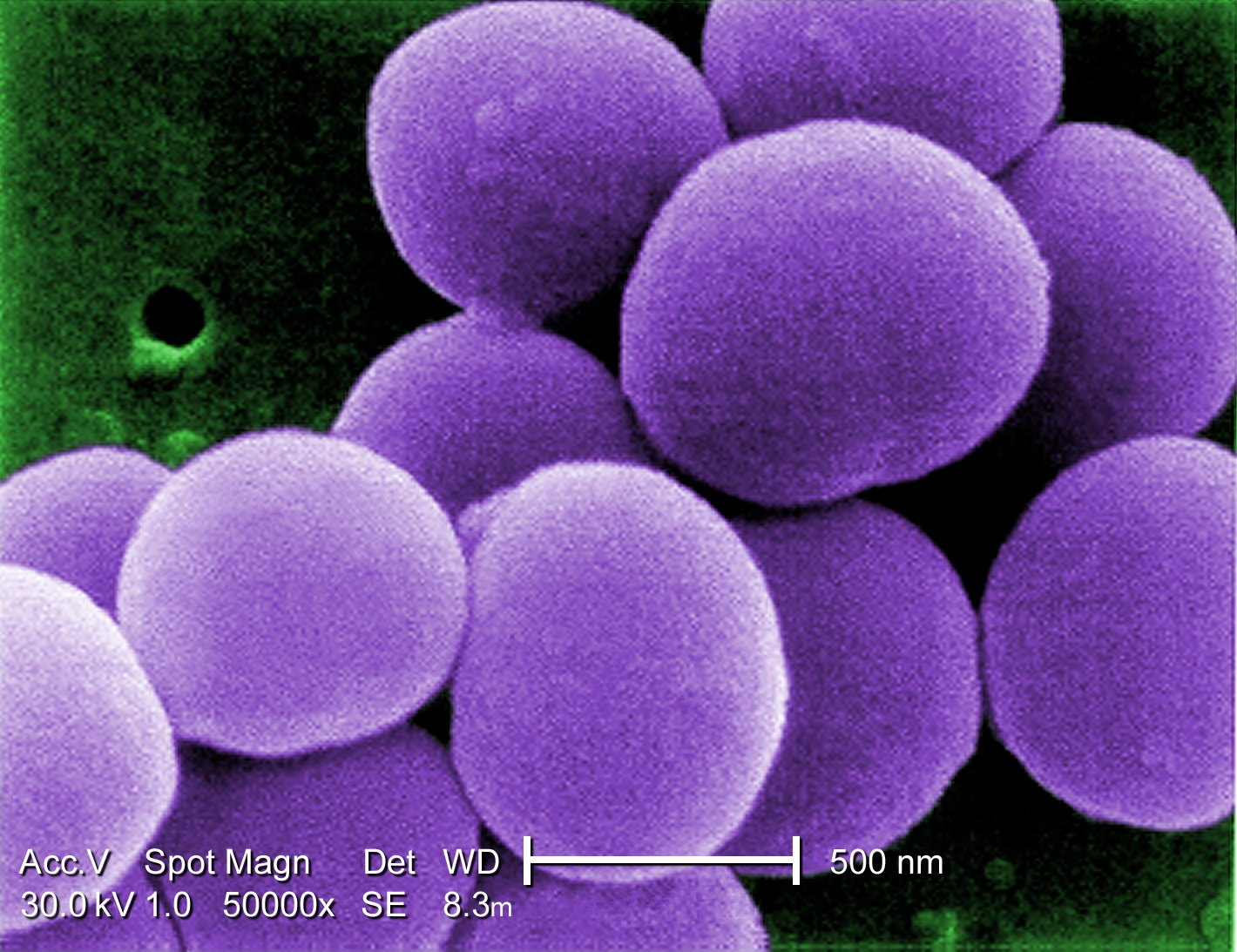
- Scanning electron micrograph (SEM) shows a strain of Staphylococcus aureus bacteria taken from a vancomycin-intermediate Staphylococcus aureus (VISA) culture.
- Specialty: Microbiology
- Diagnostic method: Disk diffusion
- Treatment: Beta-lactam antibiotic (in combination)

Vancomycin-resistant Staphylococcus aureus (VRSA) are strains of Staphylococcus aureus that have acquired resistance to the glycopeptide antibiotic vancomycin. Bacteria can acquire resistance genes either by random mutation or through the transfer of DNA from one bacterium to another. Resistance genes interfere with the normal antibiotic function and allow bacteria to grow in the presence of the antibiotic. Resistance in VRSA is conferred by the plasmid-mediated vanA gene and operon. Although VRSA infections are uncommon, VRSA is often resistant to other types of antibiotics, posing a potential threat to public health.

== Mechanism of acquired resistance ==
Vancomycin-resistant Staphylococcus aureus was first reported in the United States in 2002. To date, documented cases of VRSA have shown acquired resistance through uptake of a vancomycin resistance gene cluster from Enterococcus (i.e. VRE). The acquired mechanism is typically the vanA gene and operon from a plasmid in Enterococcus faecium or Enterococcus faecalis.

This mechanism differs from strains of vancomycin-intermediate Staphylococcus aureus (VISA), which appear to develop resistance to vancomycin through sequential mutations resulting in a thicker cell wall and the synthesis of excess amounts of D-ala-D-ala residues.

== Diagnosis ==
The diagnosis of vancomycin-resistant Staphylococcus aureus (VRSA) is performed by susceptibility testing on a single S. aureus isolate to vancomycin. This is accomplished by first assessing the isolate's minimum inhibitory concentration (MIC) using standard laboratory methods, including disc diffusion, gradient strip diffusion, and automated antimicrobial susceptibility testing systems. Once the MIC is known, resistance ( and the "R" designation) is determined by comparing the MIC with established breakpoints published by standards development organizations such as the U.S. Clinical and Laboratory Standards Institute, the British Society for Antimicrobial Chemotherapy and the European Committee on Antimicrobial Susceptibility Testing.

== Treatment of infection ==
Rifampicin (Rifampin)

When the minimum inhibitory concentration of vancomycin is > 2 µg/mL, alternative antibiotics should be used. The approach is to treat with at least one agent to which the bacteria known to be susceptible by in vitro testing. The agents that are used include daptomycin, linezolid, telavancin, ceftaroline, and quinupristin–dalfopristin. For people with methicillin-resistant Staphylococcus aureus (MRSA) bacteremia in the setting of vancomycin failure, the Infectious Diseases Society of America recommends high-dose daptomycin, if the isolate is susceptible, in combination with another agent (e.g., gentamicin, rifampin, linezolid, trimethoprim/sulfamethoxazole, or a beta-lactam antibiotic).

== History ==
Three classes of vancomycin-resistant S. aureus have emerged that differ in vancomycin susceptibilities: vancomycin-intermediate S. aureus (VISA), heterogeneous vancomycin-intermediate S. aureus (hVISA), and high-level vancomycin-resistant S. aureus (VRSA).

=== Vancomycin-intermediate S. aureus (VISA) ===
Vancomycin-intermediate S. aureus (VISA) (/ˈviːsə/ or /viːaɪɛseɪ/) was first identified in Japan in 1996 and has since been found in hospitals elsewhere in Asia, as well as in the United Kingdom, France, the U.S., and Brazil. It is also termed GISA (glycopeptide-intermediate Staphylococcus aureus), indicating resistance to all glycopeptide antibiotics. These bacterial strains develop a thickened cell wall, which is believed to reduce the ability of vancomycin to diffuse into the cell as required for effective treatment.

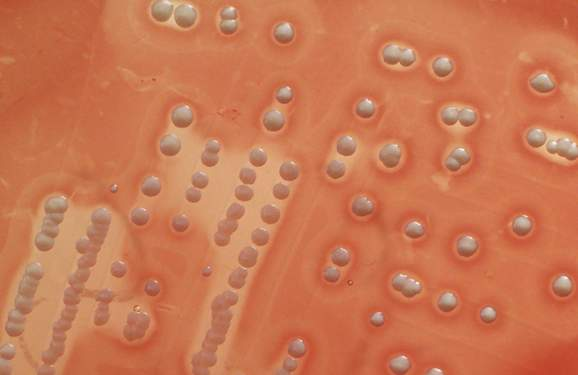
S. aureus blood agar

=== Vancomycin-resistant S. aureus (VRSA) ===
High-level vancomycin resistance in S. aureus has rarely been reported. In vitro and in vivo experiments reported in 1992 demonstrated that vancomycin resistance genes from Enterococcus faecalis could be transferred by gene transfer to S. aureus, conferring high-level vancomycin resistance. Until 2002, such a genetic transfer was not reported for wild S. aureus strains. In 2002, a VRSA strain (/ˈvɜːrsə/ or /viːɑːrɛseɪ/) was isolated from a patient in Michigan. The isolate contained the mecA gene for methicillin resistance. Vancomycin MICs of the VRSA isolate were consistent with the VanA phenotype of Enterococcus species, and the presence of the vanA gene was confirmed by polymerase chain reaction. The DNA sequence of the VRSA vanA gene was identical to that of a vancomycin-resistant strain of Enterococcus faecalis recovered from the same catheter tip. The vanA gene was later found to be encoded within a transposon located on a plasmid carried by the VRSA isolate. This transposon, Tn1546, confers vanA-type vancomycin resistance in enterococci.

As of 2019, 52 VRSA strains have been identified in the United States, India, Iran, Pakistan, Brazil, and Portugal.

=== Heterogeneous vancomycin-intermediate S. aureus (hVISA) ===
The definition of hVISA according to Hiramatsu et al. is a strain of Staphylococcus aureus that gives resistance to vancomycin at a frequency of 10^{−6} colonies or even higher.

== See also ==
- Drug resistance
