= Antibiotic sensitivity testing =

Microbiology test used in medicine

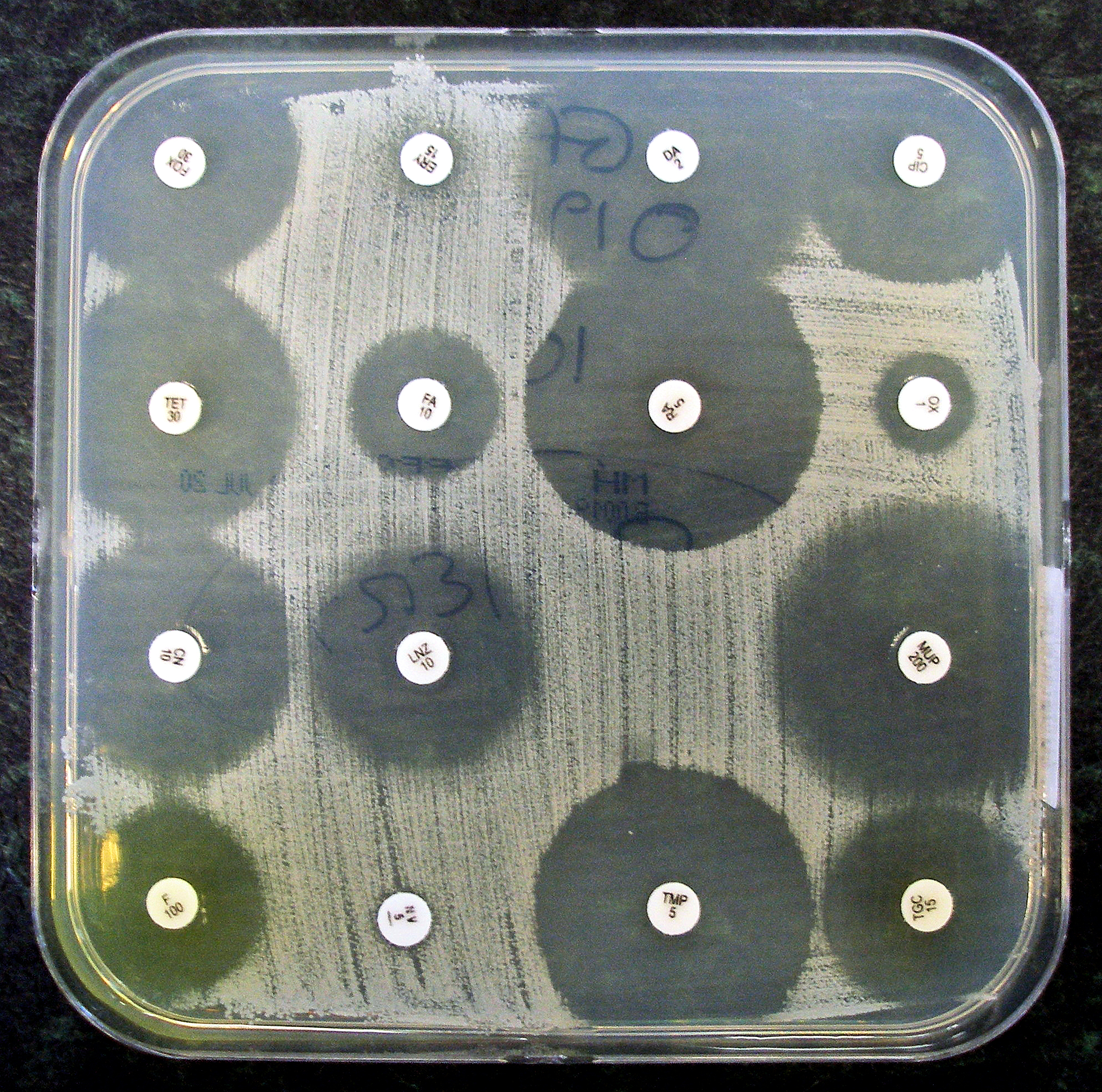
Example of antibiotic sensitivity testing. Thin paper discs containing an antibiotic have been placed on an agar plate growing bacteria. Bacteria are not able to grow around antibiotics to which they are sensitive. This is called "the zone of inhibition".

Antibiotic sensitivity testing or antibiotic susceptibility testing is the measurement of the susceptibility of bacteria to antibiotics. It is used because bacteria may have resistance to some antibiotics. Sensitivity testing results can allow a clinician to change the choice of antibiotics from empiric therapy, which is when an antibiotic is selected based on clinical suspicion about the site of an infection and common causative bacteria, to directed therapy, in which the choice of antibiotic is based on knowledge of the organism and its sensitivities.

Sensitivity testing usually occurs in a medical laboratory, and uses culture methods that expose bacteria to antibiotics, or genetic methods that test to see if bacteria have genes that confer resistance. Culture methods often involve measuring the diameter of areas without bacterial growth, called zones of inhibition, around paper discs containing antibiotics on agar culture dishes that have been evenly inoculated with bacteria. The minimum inhibitory concentration (MIC), which is the lowest concentration of the antibiotic that inhibits bacterial growth, can be estimated from the size of the zone of inhibition using standardized guidelines.

Antibiotic susceptibility testing has been needed since the discovery of the beta-lactam antibiotic penicillin. Initial methods were phenotypic, and involved culture or dilution. The Etest, an antibiotic impregnated strip, has been available since the 1980s, and genetic methods such as polymerase chain reaction (PCR) testing have been available since the early 2000s. Research is ongoing into improving current methods by making them faster or more accurate, as well as developing new methods for testing, such as microfluidics.

== Uses ==
In clinical medicine, antibiotics are most frequently prescribed on the basis of a person's symptoms and medical guidelines. This method of antibiotic selection is called empiric therapy, and it is based on knowledge about what bacteria cause an infection, and to what antibiotics bacteria may be sensitive or resistant. The Weighted-Incidence Syndromic Combination Antibiogram (WISCA) extends this by weighting local pathogen incidence against susceptibility data to estimate syndrome-level coverage for single or combination regimens.

For example, a simple urinary tract infection might be treated with trimethoprim/sulfamethoxazole. This is because Escherichia coli is the most likely causative bacterium, and may be sensitive to that combination antibiotic. However, bacteria can be resistant to several classes of antibiotics. This resistance might be because a type of bacteria has intrinsic resistance to some antibiotics, because of resistance following past exposure to antibiotics, or because resistance may be transmitted from other sources such as plasmids. Antibiotic sensitivity testing provides information about which antibiotics are more likely to be successful and should therefore be used to treat the infection.

Antibiotic sensitivity testing is also conducted at a population level in some countries as a form of screening. This is to assess the background rates of resistance to antibiotics (for example with methicillin-resistant Staphylococcus aureus), and may influence guidelines and public health measures. Open-source tools such as the AMR package for R can be used to standardise and analyse such population-level phenotypical susceptibility data against international breakpoints.

== Methods ==
Once a bacterium has been identified following microbiological culture, antibiotics are selected for susceptibility testing. Susceptibility testing methods are based on exposing bacteria to antibiotics and observing the effect on the growth of the bacteria (phenotypic testing), or identifying specific genetic markers (genetic testing). Methods used may be qualitative, meaning that a result indicates resistance is or is not present; or quantitative, using a minimum inhibitory concentration (MIC) to describe the concentration of antibiotic to which a bacterium is sensitive.

There are many factors that can affect the results of antibiotic sensitivity testing, including failure of the instrument, temperature, moisture, and potency of the antimicrobial agent. Quality control (QC) testing helps to ensure the accuracy of test results. Organizations such as the American Type Culture Collection and National Collection of Type Cultures provide strains of bacteria with known resistance phenotypes that can be used for quality control.

=== Phenotypic methods ===
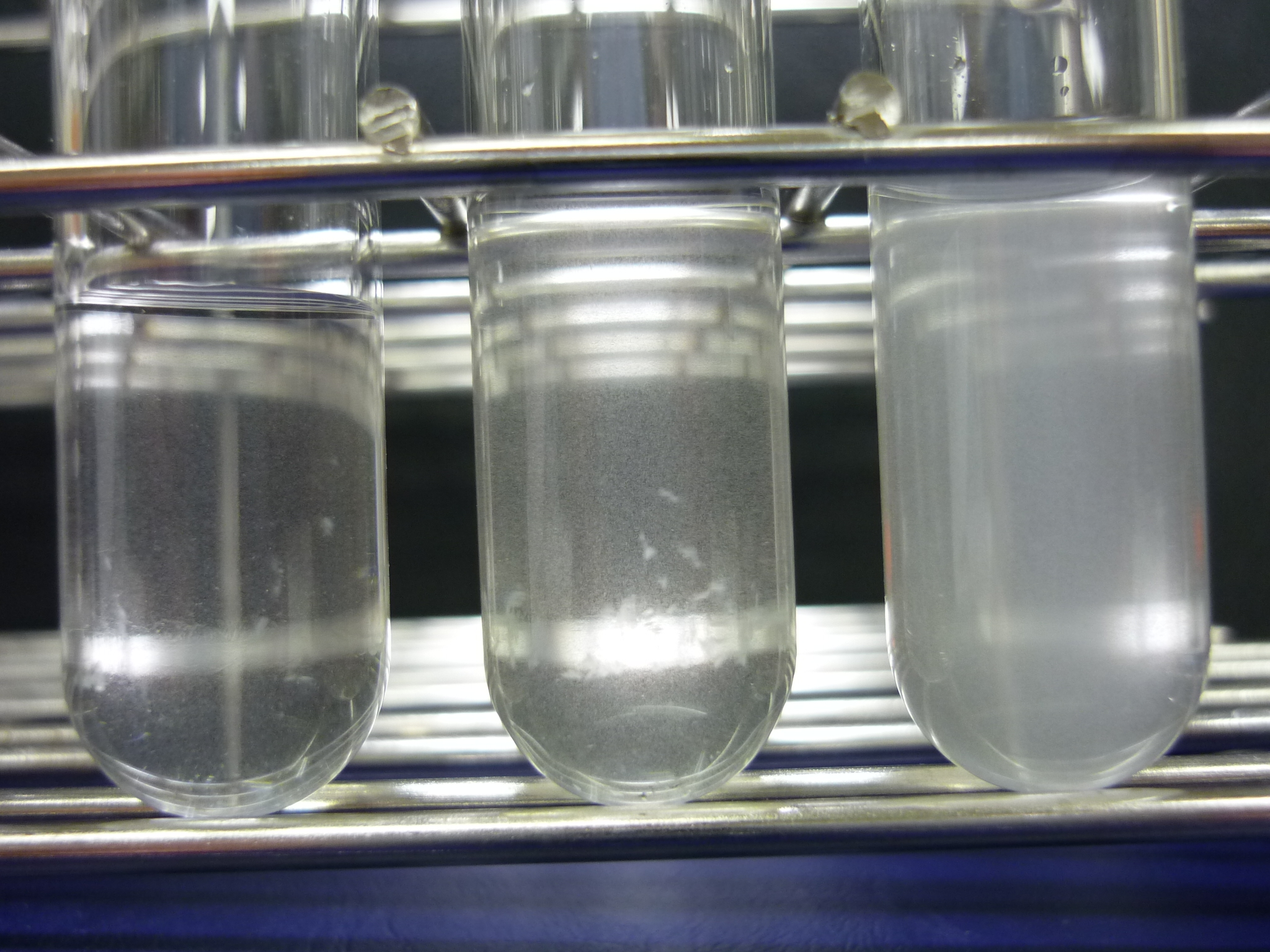
From left to right: 0.5, 1, and 2 McFarland standards

Testing based on exposing bacteria to antibiotics uses agar plates or dilution in agar or broth. The selection of antibiotics will depend on the organism grown, and the antibiotics that are available locally. To ensure that the results are accurate, the concentration of bacteria that is added to the agar or broth (the inoculum) must be standardized. This is accomplished by comparing the turbidity of bacteria suspended in saline or broth to McFarland standards—solutions whose turbidity is equivalent to that of a suspension containing a given concentration of bacteria. Once an appropriate concentration (most commonly an 0.5 McFarland standard) has been reached, which can be determined by visual inspection or by photometry, the inoculum is added to the growth medium.

==== Manual ====
The disc diffusion method involves selecting a strain of bacteria, placing it on an agar plate, and observing bacterial growth near antibiotic-impregnated discs. This is also called the Kirby-Bauer method, although modified methods are also used. In some cases, urine samples or positive blood culture samples are applied directly to the test medium, bypassing the preliminary step of isolating the organism. If the antibiotic inhibits microbial growth, a clear ring, or zone of inhibition, is seen around the disc. The bacteria are classified as sensitive, intermediate, or resistant to an antibiotic by comparing the diameter of the zone of inhibition to defined thresholds which correlate with MICs.

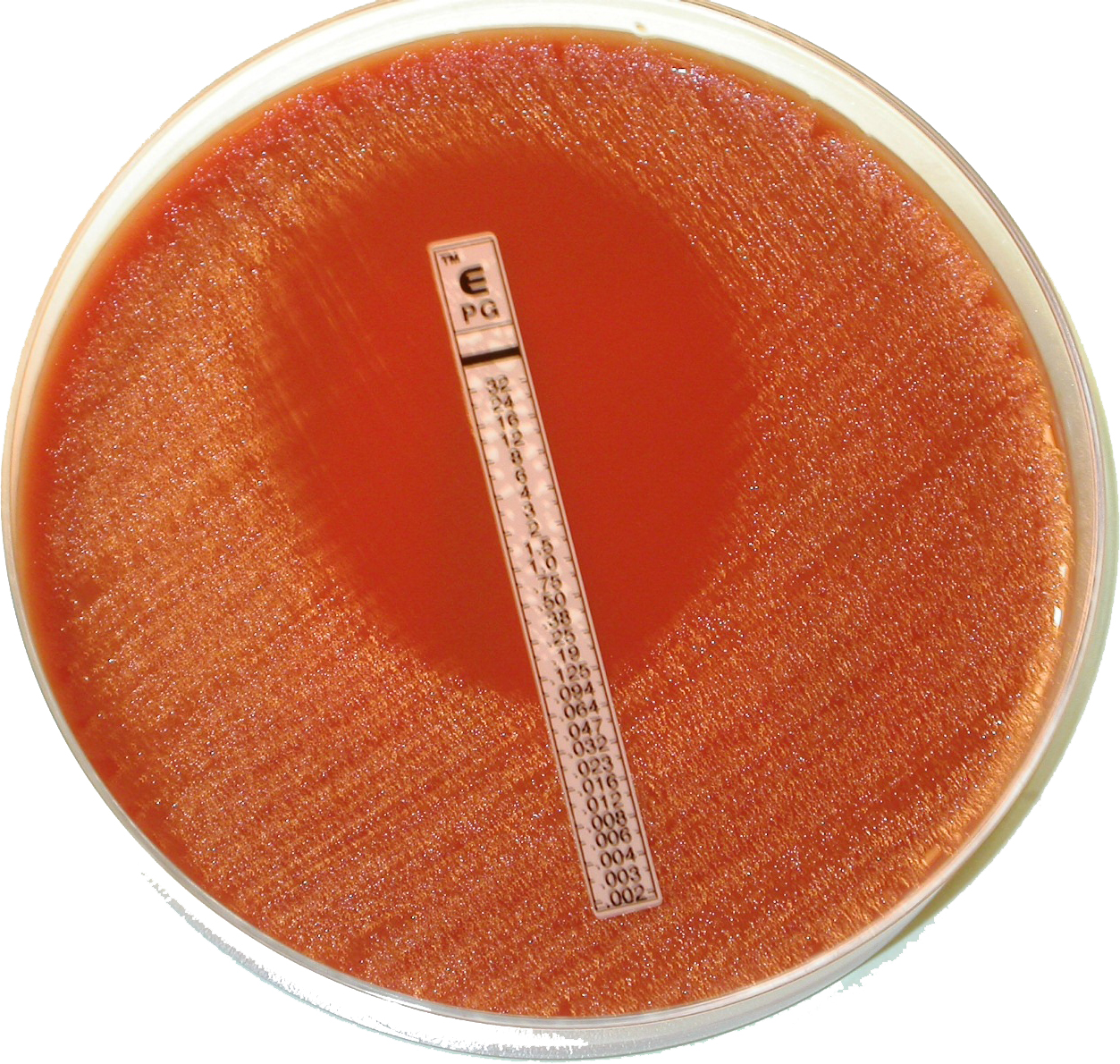
Example of an Etest, which uses a plastic strip impregnated with an antibiotic at a range of concentrations

Mueller–Hinton agar is frequently used in the disc diffusion test. The Clinical and Laboratory Standards Institute (CLSI) and European Committee on Antimicrobial Susceptibility Testing (EUCAST) provide standards for the type and depth of agar, temperature of incubation, and method of analysing results. Disc diffusion is considered the cheapest and most simple of the methods used to test for susceptibility, and is easily adapted to testing newly available antibiotics or formulations. Some slow-growing and fastidious bacteria cannot be accurately tested by this method, while others, such as Streptococcus species and Haemophilus influenzae, can be tested but require specialized growth media and incubation conditions.

Gradient methods, such as Etest, use a plastic strip placed on agar. A plastic strip impregnated with different concentrations of antibiotics is placed on a growth medium, and the growth medium is viewed after a period of incubation. The minimum inhibitory concentration can be identified based on the intersection of the teardrop-shaped zone of inhibition with the marking on the strip. Multiple strips for different antibiotics may be used. This type of test is considered a diffusion test.

In agar and broth dilution methods, bacteria are placed in multiple small tubes with different concentrations of antibiotics. Whether a bacterium is sensitive or not is determined by visual inspection or automatic optical methods, after a period of incubation. Broth dilution is considered the gold standard for phenotypic testing. The lowest concentration of antibiotics that inhibits growth is considered the MIC.

==== Automated ====
Automated systems exist that replicate manual processes, for example, by using imaging and software analysis to report the zone of inhibition in diffusion testing, or dispensing samples and determining results in dilutional testing. Automated instruments, such as the VITEK 2, BD Phoenix, and Microscan systems, are the most common methodology for AST. The specifications of each instrument vary, but the basic principle involves the introduction of a bacterial suspension into pre-formulated panels of antibiotics. The panels are incubated and the inhibition of bacterial growth by the antibiotic is automatically measured using methodologies such as turbidimetry, spectrophotometry or fluorescence detection. An expert system correlates the MICs with susceptibility results, and the results are automatically transmitted into the laboratory information system for validation and reporting. While such automated testing is less labour-intensive and more standardized than manual testing, its accuracy can be comparatively poor for certain organisms and antibiotics, so the disc diffusion test remains useful as a backup method.

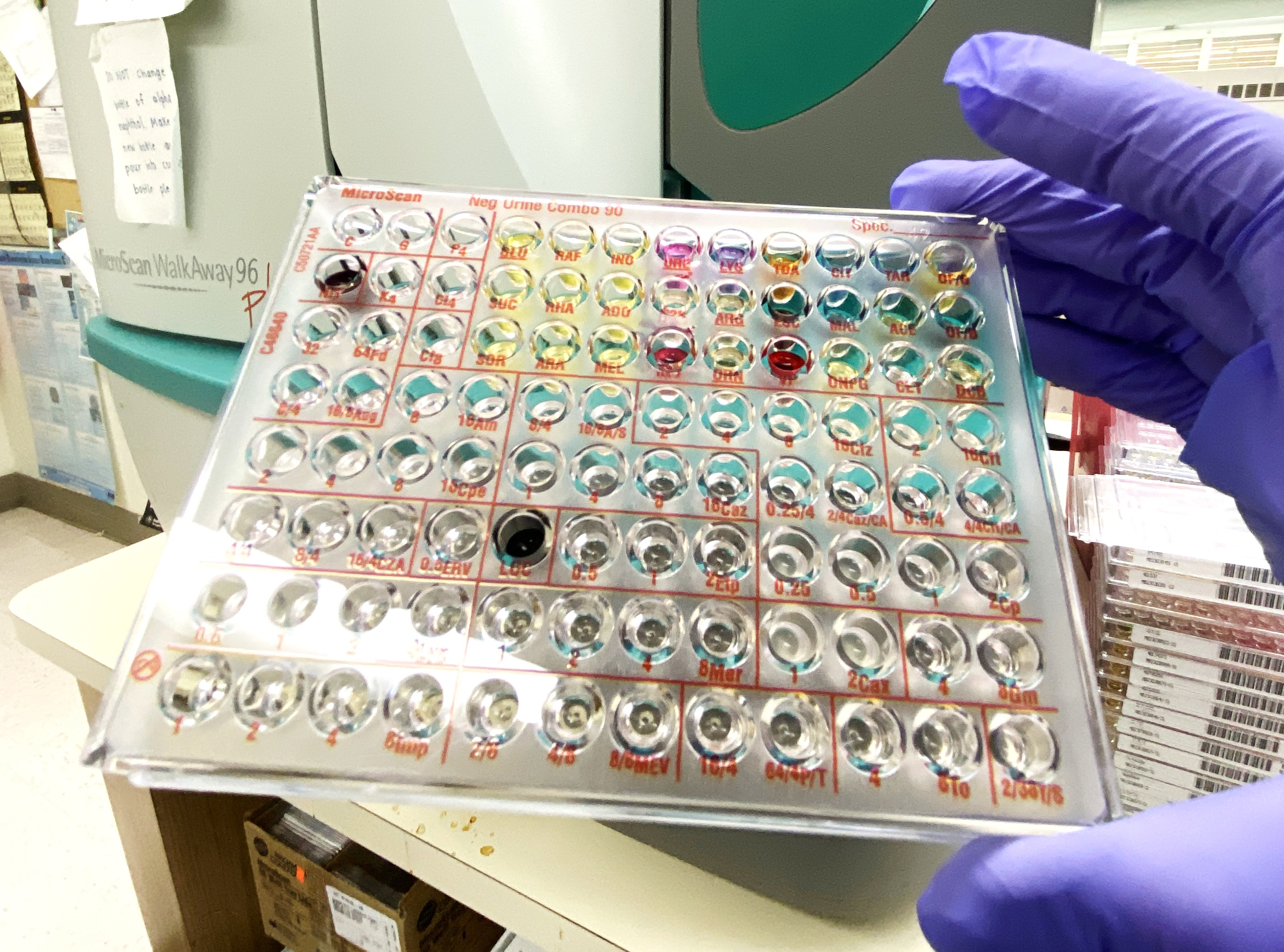
Multitarget microbial panel for automatic sensitivity testing. A small amount of the bacteria to be tested is placed in each well, each of which has the ingredients for a separate test.

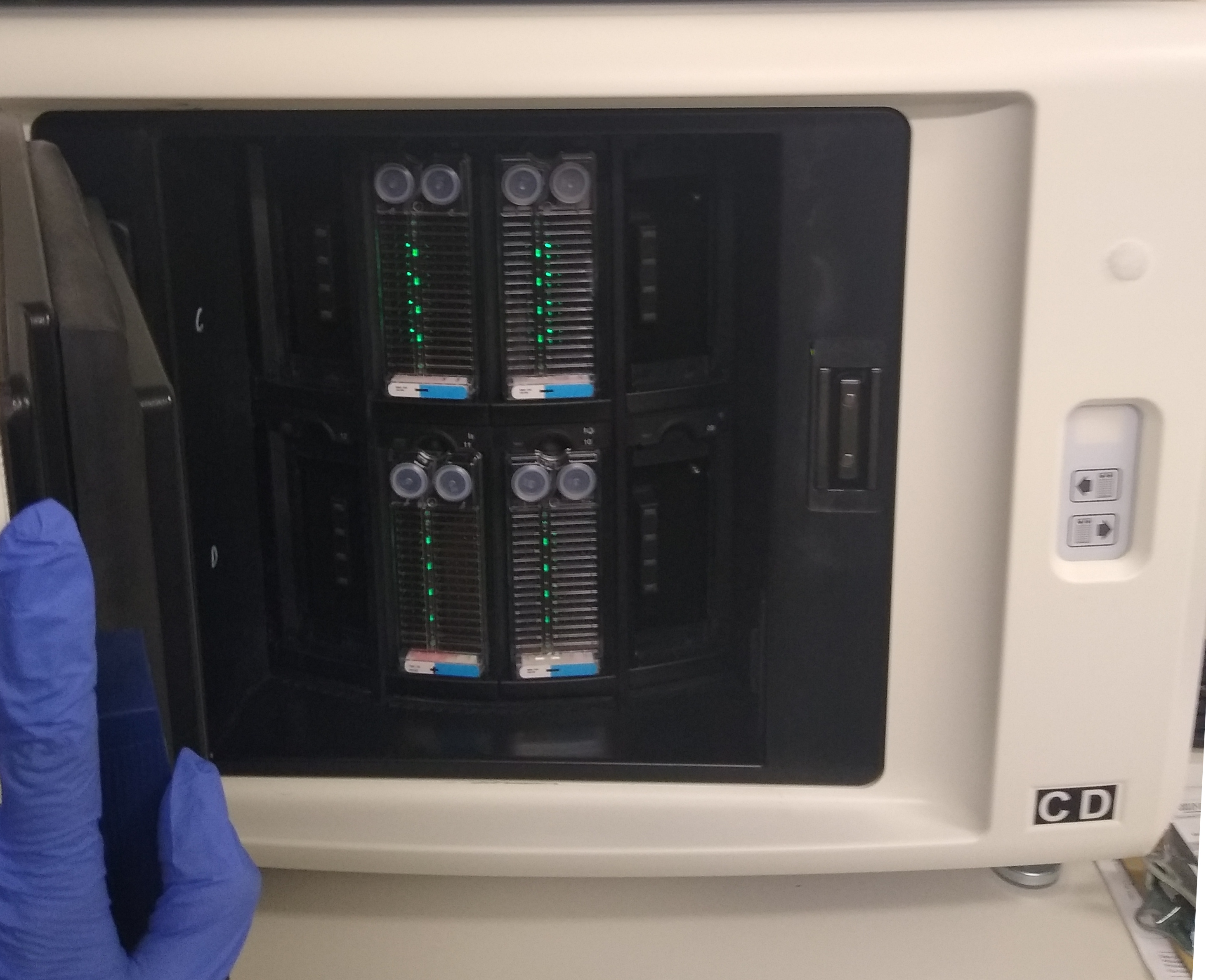
Microbial panels loaded into an instrument used for automated antibiotic sensitivity testing of each well

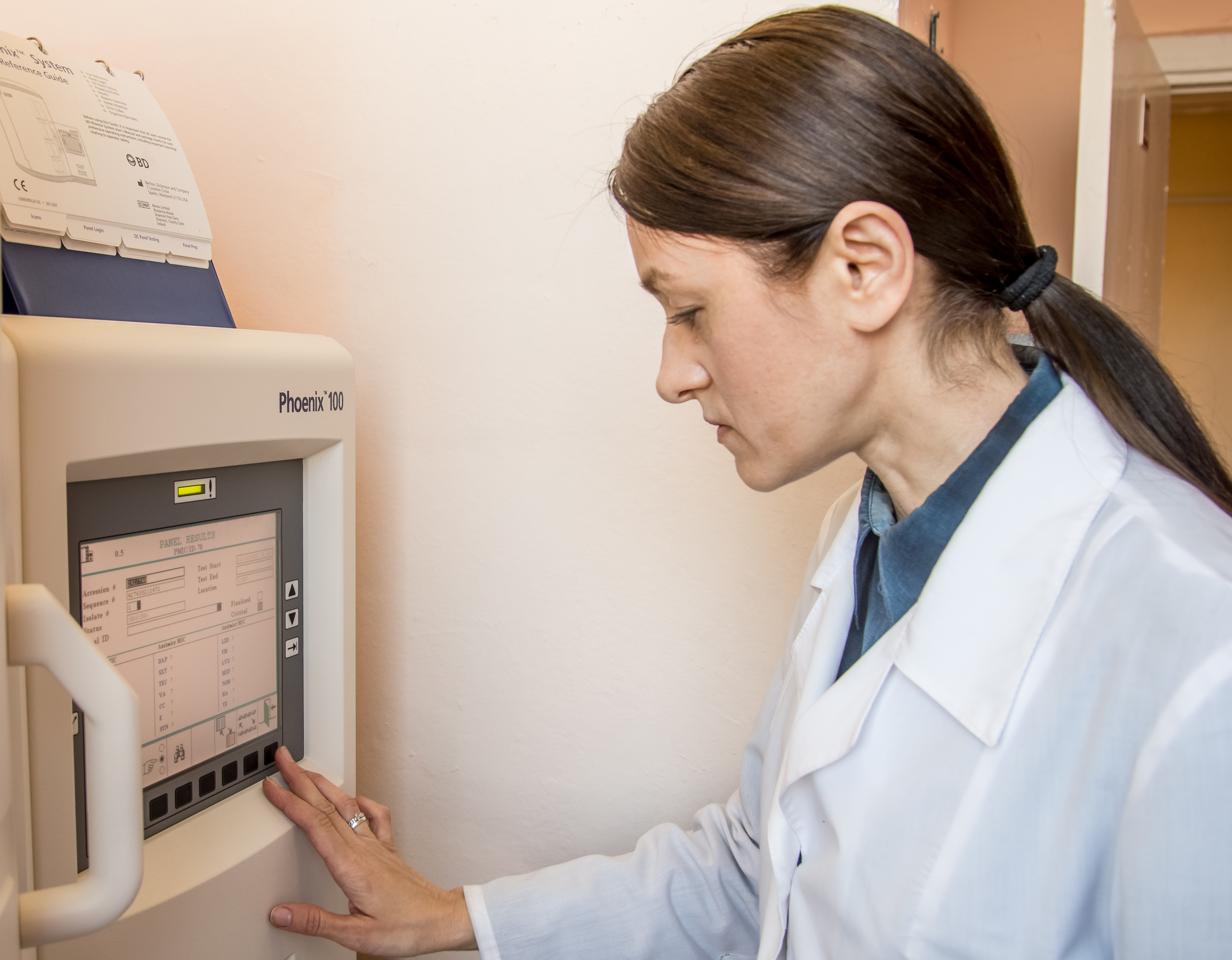
A laboratory worker reviews sensitivity results displayed on the screen of the automated analyzer.

=== Genetic methods ===
Genetic testing, such as via polymerase chain reaction (PCR), DNA microarray, and loop-mediated isothermal amplification, may be used to detect whether bacteria possess genes which confer antibiotic resistance. An example is the use of PCR to detect the mecA gene for beta-lactam resistant Staphylococcus aureus. Other examples include assays for testing vancomycin resistance genes vanA and vanB in Enterococcus species, and antibiotic resistance in Pseudomonas aeruginosa, Klebsiella pneumoniae and Escherichia coli. These tests have the benefit of being direct and rapid, as compared with observable methods, and have a high likelihood of detecting a finding when there is one to detect. However, whether resistance genes are detected does not always match the resistance profile seen with phenotypic method. The tests are also expensive and require specifically trained personnel.

Polymerase chain reaction is a method of identifying genes related to antibiotic susceptibility. In the PCR process, a bacterium's DNA is denatured and the two strands of the double helix separate. Primers specific to a sought-after gene are added to a solution containing the DNA, and a DNA polymerase is added alongside a mixture containing molecules that will be needed (for example, nucleotides and ions). If the relevant gene is present, every time this process runs, the quantity of the target gene will be doubled. After this process, the presence of the genes is demonstrated through a variety of methods including electrophoresis, southern blotting, and other DNA sequencing analysis methods.

DNA microarrays and chips use the binding of complementary DNA to a target gene or nucleic acid sequence. The benefit of this is that multiple genes can be assessed simultaneously.

Using magnetic nanoparticles studded with a beta-2-glycoprotein I peptide imitating a plasma protein, microbial pathogens could selectively be retrieved from blood culture specimens within hours, in a study published September 2024. Magnets are used to fish out the peptide-bacterial complex, followed by genetic testing.

=== MALDI-TOF ===
Matrix-assisted laser desorption ionisation-time of flight mass spectrometry (MALDI-TOF MS) is another method of susceptibility testing. This is a form of time-of-flight mass spectrometry, in which the molecules of a bacterium are subject to matrix-assisted laser desorption. The ionised particles are then accelerated, and spectral peaks recorded, producing an expression profile, which is capable of differentiating specific bacterial strains after being compared to known profiles. This includes, in the context of antibiotic susceptibility testing, strains such as beta-lactamase producing E. coli. MALDI-TOF is rapid and automated. There are limitations to testing in this format however; results may not match the results of phenotypic testing, and acquisition and maintenance is expensive.

== Reporting ==
Bacteria are marked as sensitive, resistant, or having intermediate resistance to an antibiotic based on the minimum inhibitory concentration (MIC), which is the lowest concentration of the antibiotic that stops the growth of bacteria. The MIC is compared to standard threshold values (called "breakpoints") for a given bacterium and antibiotic. Breakpoints for the same organism and antibiotic may differ based on the site of infection: for example, the CLSI generally defines Streptococcus pneumoniae as sensitive to intravenous penicillin if MICs are ≤0.06 μg/ml, intermediate if MICs are 0.12 to 1 μg/ml, and resistant if MICs are ≥2 μg/ml, but for cases of meningitis, the breakpoints are considerably lower. Sometimes, whether an antibiotic is marked as resistant is also based on bacterial characteristics that are associated with known methods of resistance such as the potential for beta-lactamase production. Specific patterns of drug resistance or multidrug resistance may be noted, such as the presence of an extended-spectrum beta lactamase. Such information may be useful to the clinician, who can change the empiric treatment to a tailored treatment that is directed only at the causative bacterium. The results of antimicrobial susceptibility tests performed during a given time period can be compiled, usually in the form of a table, to form an antibiogram. Antibiograms help the clinician to select the best empiric antimicrobial therapy based on the local resistance patterns until the laboratory test results are available.

== Clinical practice ==
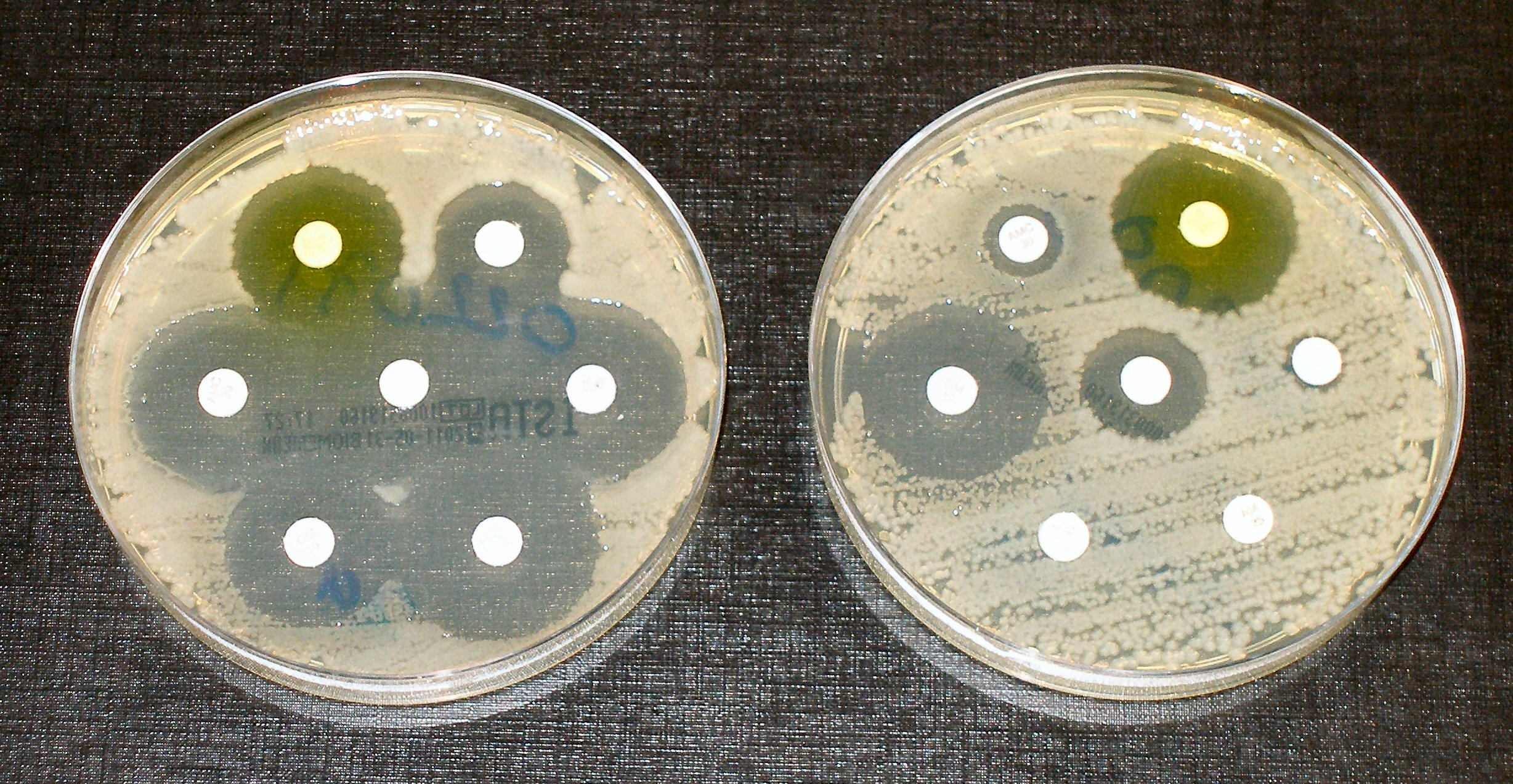
Antibiotic resistance tests: Bacteria are streaked on dishes with white disks, each impregnated with a different antibiotic. Clear rings, such as those on the left, show that bacteria have not grown—indicating that these bacteria are not resistant. The bacteria on the right are fully resistant to all but two of the seven antibiotics tested.

Ideal antibiotic therapy is based on determining the causal agent and its antibiotic sensitivity. Empiric treatment is often started before laboratory microbiological reports are available. This might be for common or relatively minor infections based on clinical guidelines (such as community-acquired pneumonia), or for serious infections, such as sepsis or bacterial meningitis, in which delayed treatment carries substantial risks. The effectiveness of individual antibiotics varies with the anatomical site of the infection, the ability of the antibiotic to reach the site of infection, and the ability of the bacteria to resist or inactivate the antibiotic.

Specimens for antibiotic sensitivity testing are ideally collected before treatment is started. A sample may be taken from the site of a suspected infection; such as a blood culture sample when bacteria are suspected to be present in the bloodstream (bacteraemia), a sputum sample in the case of a pneumonia, or a urine sample in the case of a urinary tract infection. Sometimes multiple samples may be taken if the source of an infection is not clear. These samples are transferred to the microbiology laboratory where they are added to culture media, in or on which the bacteria grow until they are present in sufficient quantities for identification and sensitivity testing to be carried out.

When antibiotic sensitivity testing is completed, it will report the organisms present in the sample, and which antibiotics they are susceptible to. Although antibiotic sensitivity testing is done in a laboratory (in vitro), the information provided about this is often clinically relevant to the antibiotics in a person (in vivo). Sometimes, a decision must be made for some bacteria as to whether they are the cause of an infection, or simply commensal bacteria or contaminants, such as Staphylococcus epidermidis and other opportunistic infections. Other considerations may influence the choice of antibiotics, including the need to penetrate through to an infected site (such as an abscess), or the suspicion that one or more causes of an infection were not detected in a sample.

== History ==
Since the discovery of the beta-lactam antibiotic penicillin, the rates of antimicrobial resistance have increased. Over time, methods for testing the sensitivity of bacteria to antibiotics have developed and changed.

Alexander Fleming in the 1920s developed the first method of susceptibility testing. The "gutter method" that he developed was a diffusion method, involving an antibiotic that was diffused through a gutter made of agar. In the 1940s, multiple investigators, including Pope, Foster and Woodruff, Vincent and Vincent used paper discs instead. All these methods involve testing only susceptibility to penicillin. The results were difficult to interpret and not reliable, because of inaccurate results that were not standardised between laboratories.

Dilution has been used as a method to grow and identify bacteria since the 1870s, and as a method of testing the susceptibility of bacteria to antibiotics since 1929, also by Alexander Fleming. The way of determining susceptibility changed from how turbid the solution was, to the pH (in 1942), to optical instruments. The use of larger tube-based "macrodilution" testing has been superseded by smaller "microdilution" kits.

In 1966, the World Health Organisation confirmed the Kirby–Bauer method as the standard method for susceptibility testing; it is simple, cost-effective and can test multiple antibiotics.

The Etest was developed in 1980 by Bolmstrӧm and Eriksson, and MALDI-TOF developed in 2000s. An array of automated systems has been developed since and after the 1980s. PCR was the first genetic test available and first published as a method of detecting antibiotic susceptibility in 2001.

== Further research ==
Point-of-care testing is being developed to speed up the time for testing, and to help practitioners avoid prescribing unnecessary antibiotics in the style of precision medicine. Traditional techniques typically take between 12 and 48 hours, although it can take up to five days. In contrast, rapid testing using molecular diagnostics is defined as "being feasible within an 8-h(our) working shift". Progress has been slow due to a range of reasons including cost and regulation.

Additional research is focused at the shortcomings of current testing methods. As well as the duration it takes to report phenotypic methods, they are laborious, have difficult portability and are difficult to use in resource-limited settings, and have a chance of cross-contamination.

As of 2017, point-of-care resistance diagnostics were available for methicillin-resistant Staphylococcus aureus (MRSA), rifampin-resistant Mycobacterium tuberculosis (TB), and vancomycin-resistant enterococci (VRE) through GeneXpert by molecular diagnostics company Cepheid.

In 2014 the Longitude Prize offered an £8 million payout to the team of researchers that develops an affordable, accurate, and fast point of care test for bacterial infection that is easy to use anywhere in the world. The prize was awarded in 2024 to Sysmex Astrego AB for a 45min point-of-care antibiotic susceptibility test for UTI based on single cell imaging.

Quantitative PCR, with the view of determining the percent of a detected bacteria that possesses a resistance gene, is being explored. Whole genome sequencing of isolated bacteria is also being explored, and likely to become more available as costs decrease and speed increases over time.

Rapid phenotypic AST is an active area of research aimed at reducing the time required to determine antibiotic susceptibility. New methods aim to detect early bacterial responses to antibiotics using techniques such as imaging, biosensors or microfluidic systems. These methods monitor changes in bacterial growth, morphology or metabolic activity shortly after exposure to antibiotics, which enables susceptibility to be determined more quickly than with conventional culture based assays.

Additional methods explored include microfluidics, which uses a small amount of fluid and a variety of testing methods, such as optical, electrochemical, and magnetic. Such assays do not require much fluid to be tested, are rapid and portable.

The use of fluorescent dyes has been explored. These involve labelled proteins targeted at biomarkers, nucleic acid sequences present within cells that are found when the bacterium is resistant to an antibiotic. An isolate of bacteria is fixed in position and then dissolved. The isolate is then exposed to fluorescent dye, which will be luminescent when viewed.

Improvements to existing platforms are also being explored, including improvements in imaging systems that are able to more rapidly identify the MIC in phenotypic samples; or the use of bioluminescent enzymes that reveal bacterial growth to make changes more easily visible.

== Bibliography ==
- Burnett D (2005). The Science of Laboratory Diagnosis. Chichester, West Sussex, England Hoboken, NJ: Wiley. ISBN 978-0-470-85912-4. OCLC 56650888.
- Ford, M (5 June 2019). Medical Microbiology. Oxford University Press. ISBN 978-0-19-881814-4.
- Mahon C, Lehman D, Manuselis G (2018). Textbook of Diagnostic Microbiology (6 ed.). Elsevier Health Sciences. ISBN 978-0-323-48212-7.
- McPherson, RA; Pincus, MR (2017). Henry's Clinical Diagnosis and Management by Laboratory Methods (23 ed.). Elsevier Health Sciences. ISBN 978-0-323-41315-2.
