= Post-antibiotic =

Post-antibiotic may refer to:

- Antibiotic resistance
- Post Antibiotic Effect
