= McFarland standards =

Scale for turbidity measurement

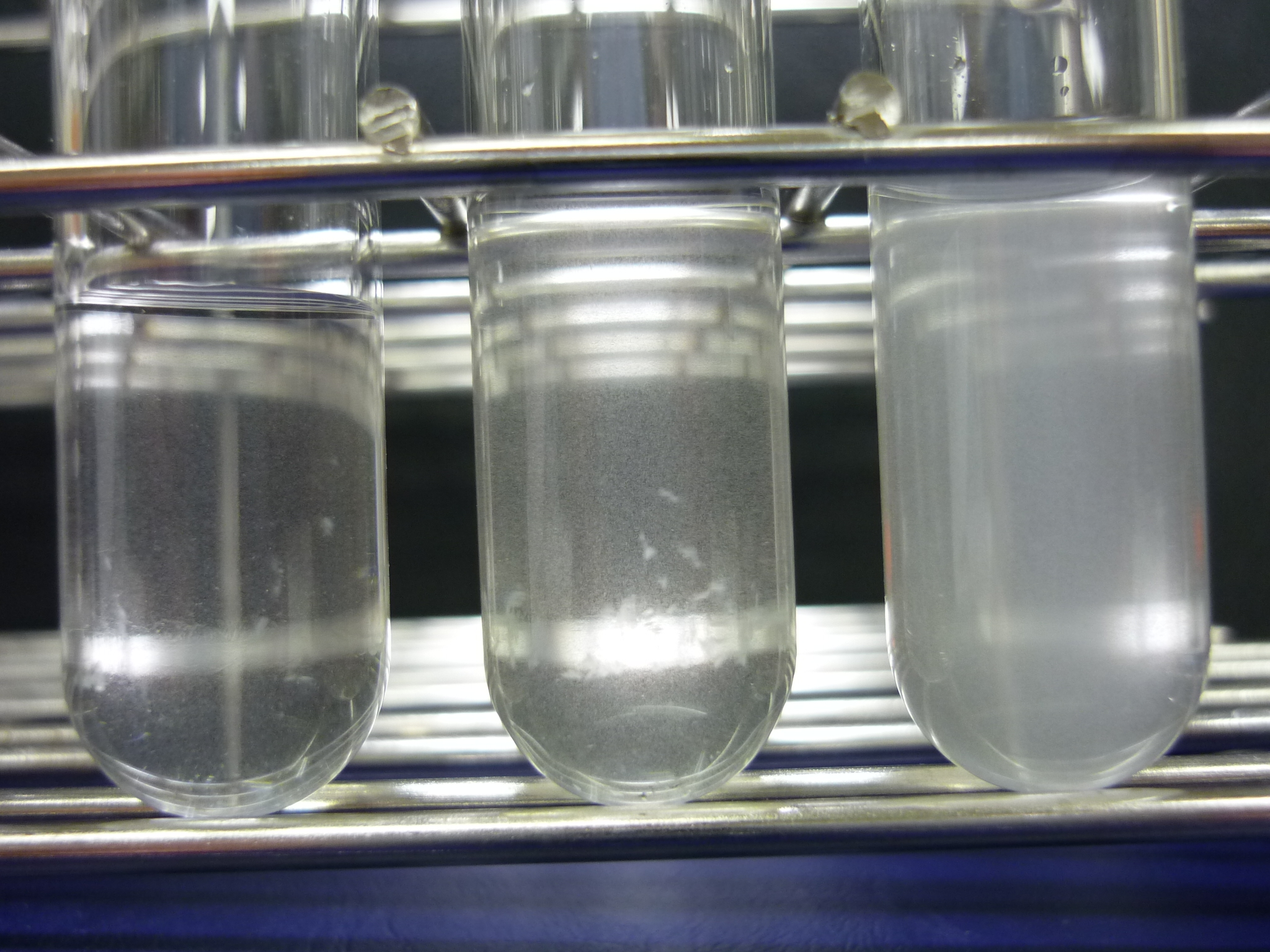
McFarland standards. No. 0.5, 1 and 2

In microbiology, McFarland standards are used as a reference to adjust the turbidity of bacterial suspensions so that the number of bacteria will be within a given range to standardize microbial testing. An example of such testing is antibiotic susceptibility testing by measurement of minimum inhibitory concentration which is routinely used in medical microbiology and research. If a suspension used is too heavy or too dilute, an erroneous result (either falsely resistant or falsely susceptible) for any given antimicrobial agent could occur.

Original McFarland standards were made by mixing specified amounts of barium chloride and sulfuric acid together. Mixing the two compounds forms a barium sulfate precipitate, which causes turbidity in the solution. A 0.5 McFarland standard is prepared by mixing 0.05 mL of 1.175% barium chloride dihydrate (BaCl_{2}•2H_{2}O), with 9.95 mL of 1% sulfuric acid (H_{2}SO_{4}).

Now there are McFarland standards prepared from suspensions of latex particles, which lengthens the shelf life and stability of the suspensions. The standard can be compared visually to a suspension of bacteria in sterile saline or nutrient broth. If the bacterial suspension is too turbid, it can be diluted with more diluent. If the suspension is not turbid enough, more bacteria can be added.

McFarland nephelometer standards:{2}

McFarland Standard No.	0.5	1	2	3	4
1.0% barium chloride (ml)	0.05	0.1	0.2	0.3	0.4
1.0% sulfuric acid (ml)	9.95	9.9	9.8	9.7	9.6
Approx. cell density (1X10^8 CFU/mL)	1.5	3.0	6.0	9.0	12.0
% transmittance*	74.3	55.6	35.6	26.4	21.5
Absorbance*	0.08 to 0.1	0.257	0.451	0.582	0.669

*at wavelength of 600 nm

McFarland latex standards from Hardy Diagnostics (2014-12-10), measured at the UCSF DeRisi Lab:

McFarland Standard No.	0.5	1	2	4	6	8
Absorbance @600nm	0.063	0.123	0.242	0.431	0.653	0.867
