= Weighted-Incidence Syndromic Combination Antibiogram =

Syndromic antimicrobial susceptibility tool

The weighted-incidence syndromic combination antibiogram (WISCA) is a method for estimating the probability that an empirical antimicrobial regimen will provide adequate coverage for a given infection syndrome, before the causative pathogen has been identified. Unlike a traditional cumulative antibiogram, which reports the susceptibility of individual organisms to individual antibiotics, a WISCA provides a single coverage estimate per regimen for an entire syndrome by weighting each pathogen's susceptibility according to how frequently it causes the syndrome in a defined population. WISCA can also evaluate combination regimens and provides a credibility interval that quantifies the statistical uncertainty of the estimate.

== Background ==
Clinicians initiating empirical antimicrobial therapy must select a regimen before culture results are available. The traditional cumulative antibiogram, as standardised by the Clinical and Laboratory Standards Institute (CLSI) in its M39 guideline, presents susceptibility percentages for individual organism–antibiotic pairs. This format has two principal limitations in the empirical setting: it does not inform the clinician about the relative frequency of different causative organisms for a given syndrome, and it cannot evaluate multi-drug regimens in a single metric. Additional challenges arise when sample sizes are small, as simple proportions such as 5 out of 10 susceptible (50%) carry far greater uncertainty than 500 out of 1000 (also 50%), yet both are displayed identically on a traditional antibiogram.

Hebert et al. (2012) first proposed the WISCA concept to address these limitations, demonstrating the method on urinary tract and abdominal-biliary infections across four hospitals in Chicago and showing that traditional antibiogram susceptibility rates could substantially overestimate empirical coverage when pathogen incidence was not accounted for. Bielicki et al. (2016) subsequently formalised WISCA as a Bayesian decision model using conjugate priors (Dirichlet for pathogen incidence, Beta for susceptibility), enabling uncertainty quantification through Monte Carlo simulation and demonstrating the value of multi-centre data pooling to improve precision for sites with small sample sizes. Cook et al. (2022) validated the approach globally, applying the Bayesian WISCA to paediatric bloodstream infections across 52 hospitals in 23 countries spanning five WHO regions, confirming that the method could generate clinically useful coverage estimates even from basic microbiological data collected via a simple questionnaire.

== Methodology ==
=== Basic principle ===
A WISCA estimates empirical coverage for a specific infection syndrome by combining two components: the relative incidence of each pathogen within the syndrome, and the susceptibility of each pathogen to the regimen under evaluation. For a regimen r and pathogens i = 1, ..., K, the coverage is calculated as:

$$\text{Coverage}_r = \sum_{i=1}^{K} p_i \cdot \theta_{i,r}$$

where p_{i} is the proportion of the syndrome caused by pathogen i and θ_{i,r} is the probability that pathogen i is susceptible to regimen r.

For combination regimens consisting of two or more antimicrobials, an isolate is considered covered if it is susceptible to at least one agent in the combination.

=== Bayesian formulation ===
Bielicki et al. (2016) formalised WISCA as a Bayesian model using conjugate priors, enabling the propagation of uncertainty through the calculation.

Pathogen incidence is modelled with a Dirichlet distribution. Given observed counts n_{1}, ..., n_{K} and a uniform prior α = (1, ..., 1):

$$\mathbf{p} \sim \text{Dirichlet}(\alpha_1 + n_1, \ldots, \alpha_K + n_K)$$

Susceptibility for each pathogen–regimen pair is modelled with a Beta distribution. Given S susceptible out of N tested isolates and a uniform prior:

$$\theta \sim \text{Beta}(0.5 + S,\; 0.5 + N - S)$$

For intrinsic antimicrobial resistance (e.g. vancomycin against E. coli), the prior becomes:

$\theta \sim \text{Beta}(1 + S,\; 9999 + N - S)$

A Monte Carlo method is used to draw samples from these posterior distributions, and for each draw the coverage is computed as the weighted sum. The resulting distribution of coverage values yields a point estimate (typically the mean or median) and a credible interval (typically 95%).

The credibility interval is a key output: it directly communicates the degree of certainty in the coverage estimate, which is particularly informative when the number of available isolates is low.

=== Extensions ===
Barbieri et al. (2021) extended the Bayesian WISCA framework to a hierarchical logistic regression model incorporating covariates such as patient age, sex, and prior antibiotic exposure, and used Hamiltonian Monte Carlo sampling via Stan. This approach allows stratified coverage estimates for specific patient subgroups while borrowing strength across strata.

== Clinical applications ==
WISCA has been applied to a variety of infection syndromes across different clinical settings.

=== Urinary tract infections ===
Hebert et al. (2012) demonstrated the method for urinary tract infections (UTIs) and abdominal-biliary infections, comparing WISCA with a traditional antibiogram. Barbieri et al. (2021) developed a Bayesian WISCA for paediatric community-acquired UTIs, stratifying by age, sex, and comorbidity, and found significant differences in coverage between subgroups.

=== Critical care infections ===
Randhawa et al. (2014) constructed WISCAs for ventilator-associated pneumonia (VAP) and catheter-related bloodstream infection (CRBSI) in a Canadian intensive care unit. The study found that while no single-agent regimen achieved greater than 80% coverage for both syndromes, several dual-agent regimens exceeded 90% coverage.

=== Paediatric bloodstream infections ===
Bielicki et al. (2016) applied the Bayesian WISCA model to paediatric bloodstream infections using pooled data from 19 European hospitals, evaluating five empirical regimens.

=== Febrile neutropenia ===
Liberati et al. (2024) used WISCA to evaluate empirical regimens for febrile neutropenia in paediatric oncology patients at two Italian centres.

=== Prosthetic joint infections ===
A 2025 study applied WISCA to prosthetic joint infections, demonstrating its utility for guiding both empirical and definitive antibiotic selection in culture-negative cases.

== Advantages over traditional antibiograms ==
Traditional cumulative antibiograms and WISCA yield the same point estimate for monotherapy coverage when applied to the same population, because weighting pathogen incidence against per-pathogen susceptibility algebraically simplifies to the overall proportion of susceptible isolates. The principal advantages of WISCA are therefore:

- Uncertainty quantification: the Bayesian approach provides a credibility interval alongside each coverage estimate, making the reliability of the estimate transparent, which is especially important when the number of available isolates is small.
- Combination therapy evaluation: WISCA provides a standardised, validated method for computing the joint coverage of multi-drug regimens, accounting for the fact that an isolate is covered if susceptible to at least one agent.
- Syndrome specificity: results can be stratified by clinical syndrome and patient subgroup.

== Limitations ==
WISCA assumes that the microbiological data used as input are representative of the target population. It does not model changes in resistance over time, does not account for pharmacokinetic factors such as tissue penetration, and does not incorporate clinical outcomes. Small sample sizes remain a challenge; although the Bayesian framework handles low counts more gracefully than simple proportions, the resulting credibility intervals may be too wide to support clinical decision-making.

== Software ==
WISCA is implemented in the open-source AMR R package which provides the function wisca() for computing Bayesian WISCA estimates from microbiological data, including support for combination regimens, stratification, and multiple languages.

== See also ==
- Antibiotic sensitivity testing
- Antimicrobial stewardship
- Empiric therapy
- Antimicrobial resistance
- Bayesian inference
