= EARS-Net =

Biological database

European Antimicrobial Resistance Surveillance Network (EARS-Net)
Content
- Description: Database focused on documentation of eight bacterial pathogens in the EU.
- Data types captured: Antimicrobial resistance
- Organisms: Bacteria

Access
- Website: www.ecdc.europa.eu/en/about-us/partnerships-and-networks/disease-and-laboratory-networks/ears-net

Miscellaneous
- Bookmarkable entities: yes

EARS-Net otherwise known as European Antimicrobial Resistance Surveillance Network is a central and comprehensive database for the European Union that focuses on eight different bacterial pathogens.

== Scope ==
EARS-Net tracks resistance rates reported in routine clinical antimicrobial susceptibility data from local and clinical laboratories, gathered by national surveillance programs and laboratory networks. Resistance status is determined according to EUCAST guidelines. Only data from invasive isolates (blood and cerebrospinal fluid) are included in EARS-Net. The antibiotics for which resistance is tracked varies by species, and is based on EUCAST recommendations. Resistance data is collected for these eight pathogens only:

- Escherichia coli
- Klebsiella pneumoniae
- Pseudomonas aeruginosa
- Acinetobacter species
- Streptococcus pneumoniae
- Staphylococcus aureus
- Enterococcus faecalis
- Enterococcus faecium

== Caveats ==
Several factors can affect the reliability of inter-country comparisons of resistance rates, due to differences in data quality and biased introduced during data collection and reporting. Several identified by EARS-Net are:

- Population coverage: some countries have large surveillance networks that cover most of their population, while others use a smaller subset of hospitals and laboratories to generate data intended to be representative of the broader population.
- Sampling: EARS-Net data are only collected for invasive isolates (from blood or cerebrospinal fluid). These samples may not be representative of the members of this species that can colonize and infect humans, so resistance rates for other infections, such as urinary tract infections may vary. In some settings, laboratory microbiology work may only be performed in cases where initial antibiotic treatment has failed, leading to an overestimation of resistance rates.
- Laboratory routines and capacity: interpretation of minimum inhibitory concentration may vary across laboratories and countries, depending on current practice. Recommendations around converting minimum inhibitory concentration to resistance status also change over time, making comparison of resistance rates over time challenging.

== History ==
EARS-Net is the collaborative effort of 29 countries. The information documented are antibiotic resistance which are determined according to the EUCAST standard. Around 80% of the participants utilize the EUCAST standard for detection of antibiotic resistance. EARS-Net was established in 1998 as EARSS, funded by the European Commission's Directorate General for Health and Consumer Affairs and the Dutch Ministry of Health, Welfare and Sports. However, in January 2010, it was transferred to the European Centre for Disease Prevention and Control (ECDC) where it was renamed EARS-Net.

== See also ==
- Antimicrobial Resistance databases
