= Etest =

Type of microbiology test

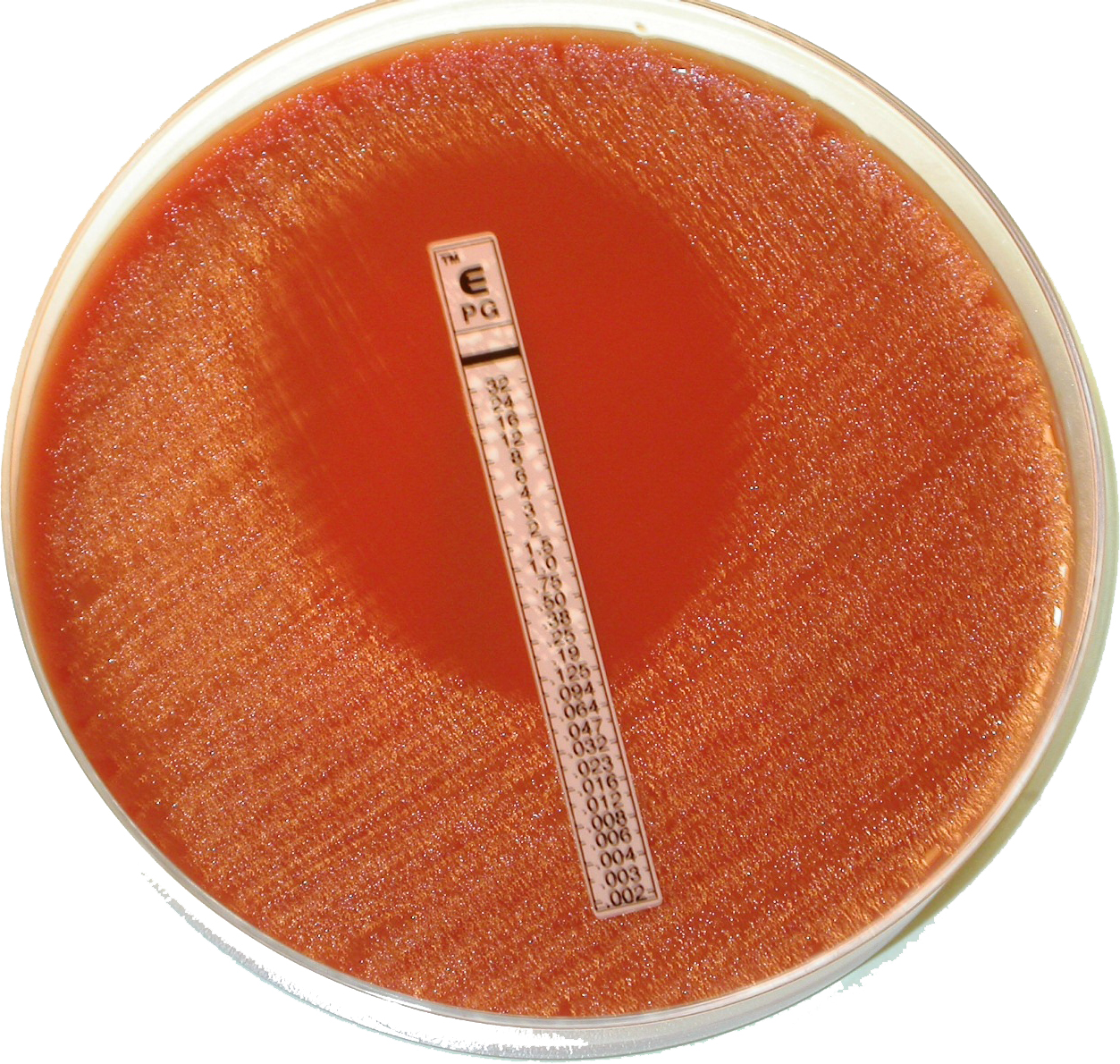
Etest being used to determine the susceptibility of Neisseria gonorrhoeae to benzylpenicillin.

Etest (previously known as the Epsilometer test) is a way of determining antimicrobial sensitivity by placing a strip impregnated with antimicrobials onto an agar plate. A strain of bacterium or fungus will not grow near a concentration of antibiotic or antifungal if it is sensitive. For some microbial and antimicrobial combinations, the results can be used to determine a minimum inhibitory concentration (MIC). Etest is a proprietary system manufactured by bioMérieux. It is a laboratory test used in healthcare settings to help guide physicians by indicating what concentration of antimicrobial could successfully be used to treat patients' infections.

== Use ==
Etest is a quantitative technique for determining the MIC of microorganisms. It is used for a range of Gram-negative and Gram-positive bacteria such as Pseudomonas, Staphylococcus, and Enterococcus species, as well as fastidious bacteria, such as Neisseria and Streptococcus pneumoniae. It can also be used to determine MICs against certain fungi.

Etest is a pre-prepared non-porous plastic reagent strip with a predefined gradient of antibiotic, covering a continuous concentration range. It is applied to the surface of an agar plate inoculated with the test strain, where there is release of the antimicrobial gradient from the plastic carrier to the agar to form a stable and continuous gradient beneath and in nearby to the strip.

The time taken for a plate to be ready depends on the m that is being tested, and the conditions of the agar plate. The predefined Etest gradient remains stable for at least 18 to 24 hours; that is, a period that covers the critical times of many species of fastidious and non-fastidious organisms.

After the test, the bacterial growth becomes visible after incubation and a symmetrical inhibition ellipse centered along the strip is seen. The MIC value is read from the scale in terms of μg/mL where the ellipse edge intersects the strip. After the required incubation period, the minimum inhibitory value is read where the edge of the inhibition ellipse intersects the side of the strip. The plate should not be read if the culture appears mixed or if the lawn of growth is too light or too heavy.

Etest MIC endpoints are usually clear-cut although different growth/inhibition patterns may be seen depending on the antifungal or antibiotic used.

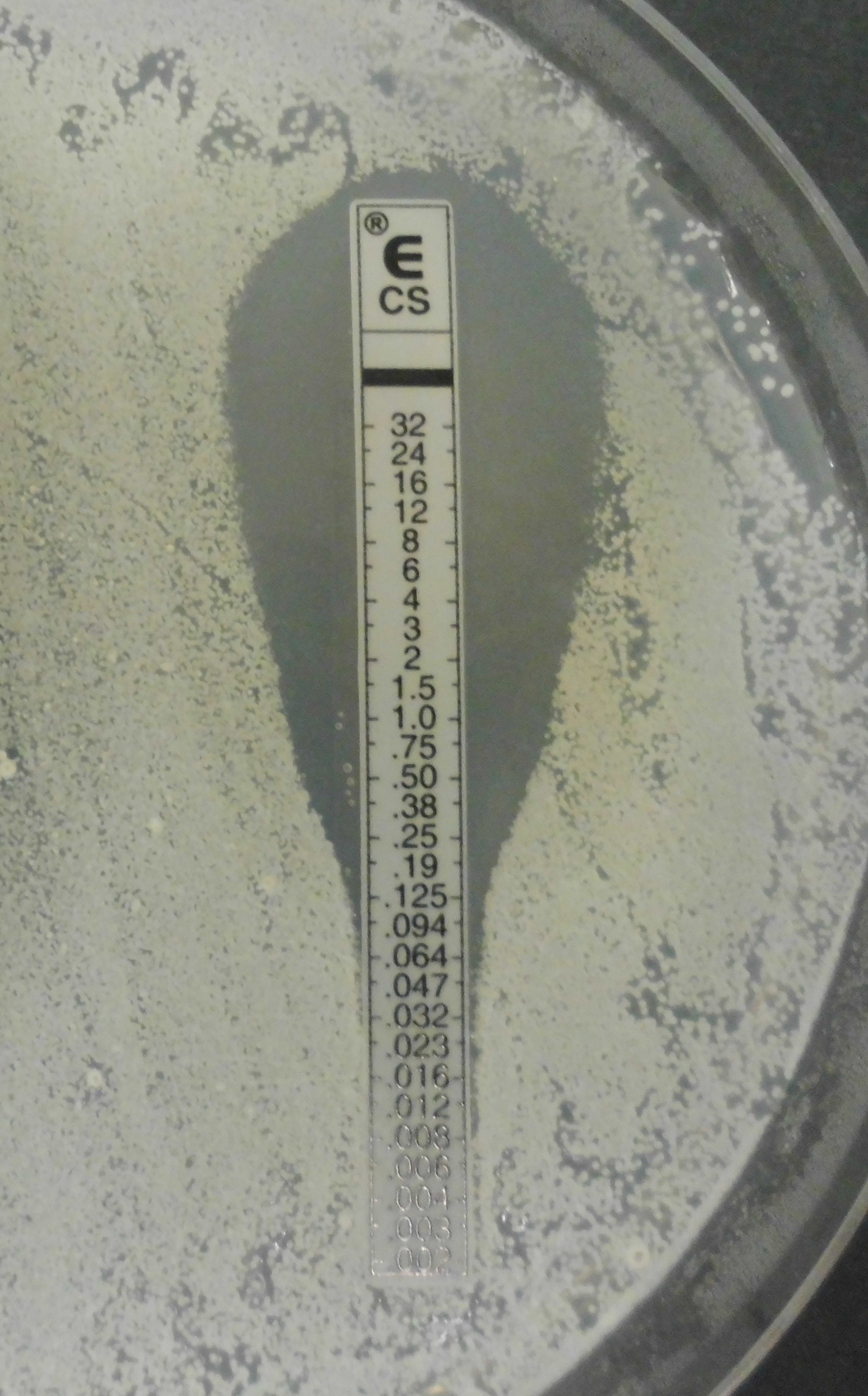
E-test being used to determine the susceptibility of Candida albicans to caspofungin.

=== Selection of agar medium ===
Etest can be used with many different kinds of AST agar medium as long as the medium supports good growth of the test organism and does not interfere with the activity of the antimicrobial agent. However, to maximise reproducibility, the medium chosen should fulfil the basic requirements for a susceptibility test medium. The following AST media are recommended for use with Etest:

- Aerobes: Mueller Hinton agar such as MHE (bioMérieux)
- Anaerobes: Brucella blood agar with appropriate supplements

These media may require supplemental nutrients to obtain enhanced growth of nutritionally fastidious organisms such as pneumococci, streptococci, Abiotrophia, Haemophilus, gonococci, meningococci and Campylobacter. In general, media recommendations from the Clinical and Laboratory Standards Institute (CLSI) and European Committee on Antimicrobial Susceptibility Testing (EUCAST) are considered appropriate for Etest.

== Etest equipment ==
The Etest family of instruments is designed to simplify the daily use of Etest. Simplex C76, Nema C88, and Retro C80 are easy to use, reducing operator fatigue, saving time and improving the quality of results by increasing reproducibility. Etest and related instruments offer one of the most efficient methods for generating on-scale MIC values across 15 doubling dilutions for susceptibility testing of a wide range of drug-bug combinations, including fastidious organisms.

- Simplex C76 automates the placement of 1 to 6 different Etest strips to simplify the setup of MIC panels. Application of up to 6 strips for large agar plates or up to 2 strips on small plates takes <12 seconds.
- Retro C80 is a rota-plater that simplifies and standardizes the inoculation of small and large agar plates making Etest® easier to read when compared to manual streaking.
- Nema C88 is a vacuum pen that simplifies the application of Etest® strips. The applicator is held like a pen and the evacuation hole is covered with the fingertip to create suction. The suction cup is placed on the strip to lift it up and then position onto the agar surface. The strip is released by removing the finger tip from the evacuation hole.

== History ==
The Etest strip was first described in 1988 and was introduced commercially in 1991 by AB BIODISK. bioMérieux acquired AB BIODISK in 2008 and continues to manufacture and market this product range under the mark Etest.

During the 1950s, Hans Ericsson (Professor of microbiology at the Karolinska Hospital and Karolinska Institute, Stockholm), the scientific founder of AB BIODISK, developed a method to standardize the disk diffusion test and to improve its reproducibility and reliability for clinical susceptibility predictions. The inhibition zone sizes from disk test results were compared to MIC values based on the reference agar dilution procedure. The correlation between zone sizes and MIC values was then assessed using regression analysis and regression lines were used for extrapolating zone interpretive limits that corresponded to the MIC breakpoint values that defined susceptible, intermediate and resistant categorical results.

Etest was first presented at the Interscience Conference on Antimicrobial Agents and Chemotherapy (ICAAC) in Los Angeles in 1988 as a novel gradient concept for MIC determinations. In September 1991, Etest was launched globally as a MIC product after receiving the USA Food and Drug Administration (FDA) clearance.

== See also ==
- Antibiotic sensitivity testing
