= Antimicrobial pharmacodynamics =

Antimicrobial pharmacodynamics is the relationship between the concentration of an antibiotic and its ability to inhibit vital processes of endo- or ectoparasites and microbial organisms. This branch of pharmacodynamics relates the concentration of an anti-infective agent to its effect, specifically to its antimicrobial effect.

== Concentration-dependent effects ==
The minimum inhibitory concentration (MIC) and minimum bactericidal concentration are used to measure in vitro activity of antimicrobial agents. They are good indicators of antimicrobial potency, but don't give any information relating to time-dependent antimicrobial killing (the so-called post antibiotic effect).

== Post-antibiotic effect ==
The post-antibiotic effect (PAE) is defined as persistent suppression of bacterial growth after a brief exposure (1 or 2 hours) of bacteria to an antibiotic even in the absence of host defense mechanisms. Factors that affect the duration of the post-antibiotic effect include duration of antibiotic exposure, bacterial species, culture medium and class of antibiotic. It has been suggested that an alteration of DNA function is possibly responsible for the post-antibiotic effect following the observation that most inhibitors of protein and nucleic acid synthesis (aminoglycosides, fluoroquinolones, tetracyclines, clindamycin, certain newer macrolides/ketolides, and rifampicin and rifabutin) induce long-term PAE against susceptible bacteria. Theoretically, the ability of an antibiotic to induce a PAE is an attractive property since antibiotic concentrations could fall below the MIC for the bacterium yet retain their effectiveness in their ability to suppress the growth. Therefore, an antibiotic with PAE would require less frequent administration and it could improve patient adherence with regard to pharmacotherapy. Proposed mechanisms include (1) slow recovery after reversible nonlethal damage to cell structures; (2) persistence of the drug at a binding site or within the periplasmic space; and (3) the need to synthesize new enzymes before growth can resume. Most antimicrobials possess significant in vitro PAEs (≥ 1.5 hours) against susceptible gram-positive cocci. Antimicrobials with significant PAEs against susceptible gram-negative bacilli are limited to carbapenems and agents that inhibit protein or DNA synthesis.
