= Directed therapy =

Treatment of known cause of infection

Directed therapy refers to the treatment of infections based on specific knowledge of what the causal agent is able to be treated with. It is the opposite to empiric therapy, which refers to the treatment of infections based on the clinical suspicion about what the agent should be able to be treated with, based on experience or guidelines.

Information that directs therapy may medical tests that isolate the cause of an infection, such as microbiological culture, or polymerase chain reaction testing, as well as testing for antimicrobial sensitivities. Often, directed therapy occurs after initial empiric therapy. Empiric therapy is often commenced first, particularly important when antimicrobial sensitivities are not known, or when a severe infection such as one causing sepsis has been identified. In this circumstance, the decision may be made for empiric therapy first. A change to directed therapy may be associated with a change in antimicrobials, a change in the duration of treatment, or the cessation of unnecessary antimicrobials.

Directed therapy is considered important because it ensures a person is completely treated for an infection, and because it can help lower the rate of antimicrobial resistance.
