= Serial dilution =

Step-wise dilution of a substance in solution

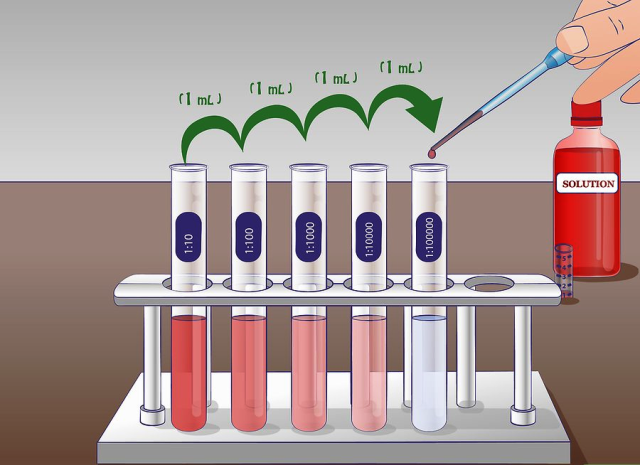
Logarithmic dilution

A serial dilution is the step-wise dilution of a substance in solution, either by using a constant dilution factor, or by using a variable factor between dilutions. If the dilution factor at each step is constant, this results in a geometric progression of the concentration in a logarithmic fashion. A ten-fold serial dilution could be 1 M, 0.1 M, 0.01 M, 0.001 M, etc.

Serial dilutions are used to accurately create highly diluted solutions as well as solutions for experiments resulting in concentration curves with a logarithmic scale. A tenfold dilution for each step is called a logarithmic dilution or log-dilution, a 3.16-fold (10^{0.5}-fold) dilution is called a half-logarithmic dilution or half-log dilution, and a 1.78-fold (10^{0.25}-fold) dilution is called a quarter-logarithmic dilution or quarter-log dilution. Serial dilutions are widely used in experimental sciences, including biochemistry, pharmacology, microbiology, and physics.

== In biology and medicine ==
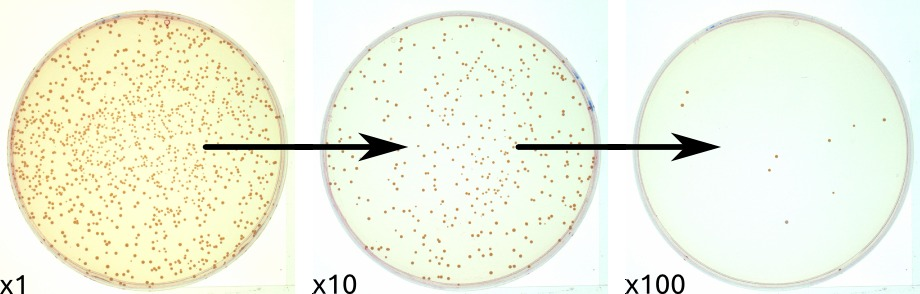
Serial dilution and plating of bacteria

In biology and medicine, serial dilution may be used to reduce the concentration of microscopic organisms or cells in a sample. As the number and size of bacterial colonies that grow on an agar plate in a given time is concentration-dependent, and since many other diagnostic techniques involve physically counting the number of micro-organisms or cells on specially printed grids (for comparing concentrations of two organisms or cell types in the sample), or wells of a given volume (for absolute concentrations), dilution can be useful for getting more manageable results. Serial dilution is also a cheaper and simpler method for preparing cultures from a single cell than optical tweezers and micromanipulators.

== In homeopathy ==
Serial dilution is one of the core foundational practices of homeopathy, with "succussion", or shaking, occurring between each dilution. In homeopathy, serial dilutions (called potentisation) are often taken so far that by the time the last dilution is completed, no molecules of the original substance are likely to remain.

== See also ==
- Dilution (equation)
- Hormesis
