= Agar dilution =

Method for testing antibiotics

Agar dilution is one of two methods (along with broth dilution) used by researchers to determine the minimum inhibitory concentration (MIC) of antibiotics. It is the dilution method most frequently used to test the effectiveness of new antibiotics when a few antibiotics are tested against a large panel of different bacteria.

== Process ==
The antibiotic to be tested is diluted with water to produce a series of concentrations. An appropriate volume is then combined with melted agar to produce plates in which the final antibiotic concentrations represent a 2-fold dilution series. After this, bacteria prepared to a standard concentration are added as a spot to each plate, with 10^{4} colony forming units (CFU) per spot. This technique allows for replicate spots of one bacterial type to be tested or spots of different bacteria so that the MIC of the antibiotic against multiple types of bacteria can be tested. Necessary controls include a control plate that does not receive any antibiotics and bacterial spread plates demonstrating that the bacteria included are in the correct concentration range. The dilution plates are then incubated at a temperature of 37 degrees Celsius. The plates are then incubated for sixteen to eighteen hours, although incubation time may be less for bacteria populations that divide quickly. After incubation, the plates are examined to determine if bacterial growth has occurred in the inoculated spots. The lowest concentration of antibiotics that prevented bacterial growth is considered to be the minimum inhibitory concentration of that antibiotic against that bacterium.

== Advantages ==
Agar dilution is considered to be the gold standard of susceptibility testing, or the most accurate way to measure the resistance of bacteria to antibiotics. The results of agar dilution are easily reproduced and they can be monitored at a much cheaper cost than what is required of other dilution methods. Additionally, up to thirty pathogen samples (plus two controls) can be tested at once, so agar dilution is useful for batch tests.

== Disadvantages ==
Each dilution plate in agar testing has to be manually inoculated with the pathogen to be tested, so agar dilution testing is both labor-intensive and expensive. Unlike broth microdilution tests, agar dilution cannot be used to test more than one antibiotic at a time.
