= Broth microdilution =

Antimicrobial resistance test

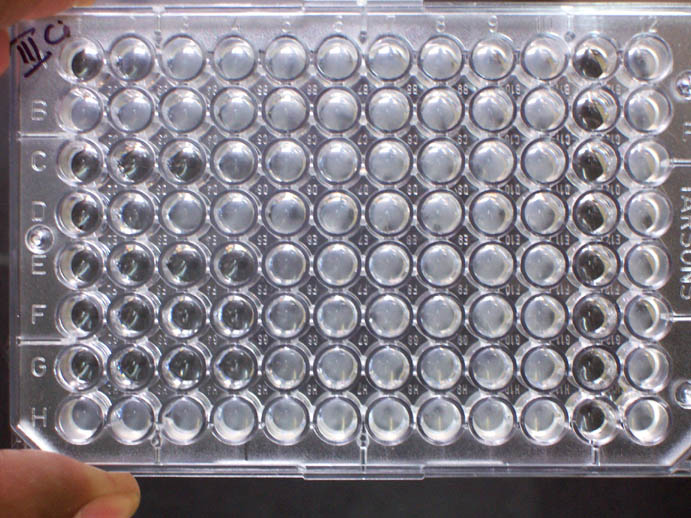
A completed broth microdilution test

Broth microdilution is a method used to test the susceptibility of microorganisms to antibiotics. It is the most commonly used method to perform this test in the United States and Europe.

== Process ==
During testing, multiple microtiter plates are filled with a certain broth, according to the needs of target bacteria. Varying concentrations of the antibiotics and the bacteria to be tested are then added to the plate. The plate is then placed into a non-CO_{2} incubator and incubated at thirty-seven degrees Celsius for sixteen to twenty hours. Following the allotted time, the plate is removed and checked for bacterial growth. If the broth became cloudy or a layer of cells formed at the bottom, then bacterial growth has occurred. The results of the broth microdilution method are reported in Minimum Inhibitory Concentration (MIC), or the lowest concentration of antibiotics that stopped bacterial expansion.

== Advantages ==
The broth microdilution method can be used to test the susceptibility of microorganisms to multiple antibiotics at once. Broth microdilution is also highly accurate. The accuracy of its results are comparable to agar dilution, the gold standard of susceptibility testing. Other advantages include the commercial availability of plates, the ease of testing and storing the plates, and the ability for the results of some tests to be read by machines.
