= Minimum bactericidal concentration =

Microbiology term

The minimum bactericidal concentration (MBC) is the lowest concentration of an antibacterial agent required to kill a particular bacterium. It can be determined from broth dilution minimum inhibitory concentration (MIC) tests by subculturing to agar plates that do not contain the test agent. The MBC is identified by determining the lowest concentration of antibacterial agent that reduces the viability of the initial bacterial inoculum by ≥99.9%. The MBC is complementary to the MIC; whereas the MIC test demonstrates the lowest level of antimicrobial agent that inhibits growth, the MBC demonstrates the lowest level of antimicrobial agent that results in microbial death. This means that even if a particular MIC shows inhibition, plating the bacteria onto agar might still result in organism proliferation because the antimicrobial did not cause death. Antibacterial agents are usually regarded as bactericidal if the MBC is no more than four times the MIC. Because the MBC test uses colony-forming units as a proxy measure of bacterial viability, it can be confounded by antibacterial agents which cause aggregation of bacterial cells. Examples of antibacterial agents which do this include flavonoids and peptides.
