= Combination antibiotic =

A combination antibiotic is one in which two ingredients are added together for additional therapeutic effect. One or both ingredients may be antibiotics.

Antibiotic combinations are increasingly important because of antimicrobial resistance. This means that individual antibiotics that used to be effective are no longer effective, and because of the absence of new classes of antibiotic, they allow old antibiotics to be continue to be used. In particular, they may be required to treat multiresistant organisms, such as carbapenem-resistant Enterobacteriaceae. Some combinations are more likely to result in successful treatment of an infection.

== Uses ==
Antibiotics are used in combination for a number of reasons:

- to treat multiresistant organisms, such as carbapenem-resistant Enterobacteriaceae.
- because a person may be infected with more than one microbe simultaneously, for example infections of the abdominal cavity after bowel perforation.
- because antibiotics used together may act synergistically to increase the efficacy of both,
- because antibiotics used together may have a broader spectrum than each antibiotic used individually.

== Examples ==
Examples of combinations include:

- Amoxicillin/clavulanic acid, which includes the beta lactam amoxicillin with the suicide inhibitor clavulanic acid, which helps the amoxicillin overcome the action of beta lactamase
- Trimethoprim/sulfamethoxazole
- Piperacillin/Tazobactam

== Research ==
Research into combination antibiotics is ongoing.
