= D-Ala-D-Ala dipeptidase =

Identifiers
- EC no.: 3.4.13.22

Databases
- IntEnz: IntEnz view
- BRENDA: BRENDA entry
- ExPASy: NiceZyme view
- KEGG: KEGG entry
- MetaCyc: metabolic pathway
- PRIAM: profile
- PDB structures: RCSB PDB PDBe PDBsum
Search
- PMC: articles
- PubMed: articles
- NCBI: proteins

D-Ala-D-Ala dipeptidase (EC 3.4.13.22, D-alanyl-D-alanine dipeptidase, vanX D-Ala-D-Ala dipeptidase, VanX) is an enzyme. This enzyme catalyses the hydrolysis of the D-alanine dipeptide.

D-Ala-D-Ala + H_{2}O $\rightleftharpoons$ 2 D-Ala

This enzyme is Zn^{2+}-dependent.
