= Minimum inhibitory concentration =

Concentration of chemical that stops bacterial growth

In microbiology, the minimum inhibitory concentration (MIC) is the lowest concentration of a chemical, usually a drug, which prevents visible in vitro growth of bacteria or fungi. MIC testing is performed in both diagnostic and drug discovery laboratories.

The MIC is determined by preparing a dilution series of the chemical, adding agar or broth, then inoculating with bacteria or fungi, and incubating at a suitable temperature. The value obtained is largely dependent on the susceptibility of the microorganism and the antimicrobial potency of the chemical, but other variables can affect results too. The MIC is often expressed in micrograms per milliliter (μg/mL) or milligrams per liter (mg/L).

In diagnostic labs, MIC test results are used to grade the susceptibility of microbes. These grades are assigned based on agreed upon values called breakpoints. Breakpoints are published by standards development organizations such as the U.S. Clinical and Laboratory Standards Institute (CLSI), the British Society for Antimicrobial Chemotherapy (BSAC) and the European Committee on Antimicrobial Susceptibility Testing (EUCAST). The purpose of measuring MICs and grading microbes is to enable physicians to prescribe the most appropriate antimicrobial treatment.

The first step in drug discovery is often measurement of the MICs of biological extracts, isolated compounds or large chemical libraries against bacteria and fungi of interest. MIC values provide a quantitative measure of an extract or compound's antimicrobial potency. The lower the MIC, the more potent the antimicrobial. When in vitro toxicity data is available, MICs can also be used to calculate selectivity index values, a measure of off-target to target toxicity.

== History ==
After the discovery and commercialization of antibiotics, microbiologist, pharmacologist, and physician Alexander Fleming developed the broth dilution technique using the turbidity of the broth for assessment. This is commonly believed to be the conception point of minimum inhibitory concentrations. Later in the 1980s, the Clinical and Laboratory Standards Institute consolidated the methods and standards for MIC determination and clinical usage. Because pathogens continue to evolve, and new drugs continue to be developed, the CLSI's MIC protocols are periodically updated to reflect these changes. The protocols and parameters set by the CLSI are considered to be the "gold standard" in the United States and are used by regulatory authorities, such as the FDA, to make evaluations.

== Clinical usage ==
Nowadays, the MIC is used in antimicrobial susceptibility testing. The MIC is reported by providing the susceptibility interpretation next to each antibiotic. The different susceptibility interpretations are: "S" (susceptible or responding to a standard dosing regimen), "I" (intermediate or requiring increased exposure), and "R" (resistant). These interpretations were developed by the CLSI and EUCAST. There have been major discrepancies between the breakpoints from various European countries over the years, and between those from the CLSI and EUCAST.

In clinics, more often than not, exact pathogens cannot be easily determined by symptoms of the patient. Then, even if the pathogen is determined, different strains of pathogens, such as Staphylococcus aureus, have varying levels of resistance to antimicrobials. As such, it is difficult to prescribe correct antimicrobials. The MIC is determined in such cases by growing the pathogen isolate from the patient on plate or broth, which is later used in the assay. Thus, knowledge of the MIC will provide a physician valuable information for making a prescription.

Accurate and precise usage of antimicrobials is also important in the context of multidrug-resistant bacteria. Microbes such as bacteria have been gaining resistance to antimicrobials they were previously susceptible to. Usage of incompatible levels of antimicrobials provides the selective pressure that has driven the direction and evolution of resistance of bacterial pathogens. This has been seen at sub-MIC levels of antibiotics. As such, it is increasingly important to determine the MIC in order to make the best choice in prescribing antimicrobials.

== Methods ==
=== Broth dilution assay ===
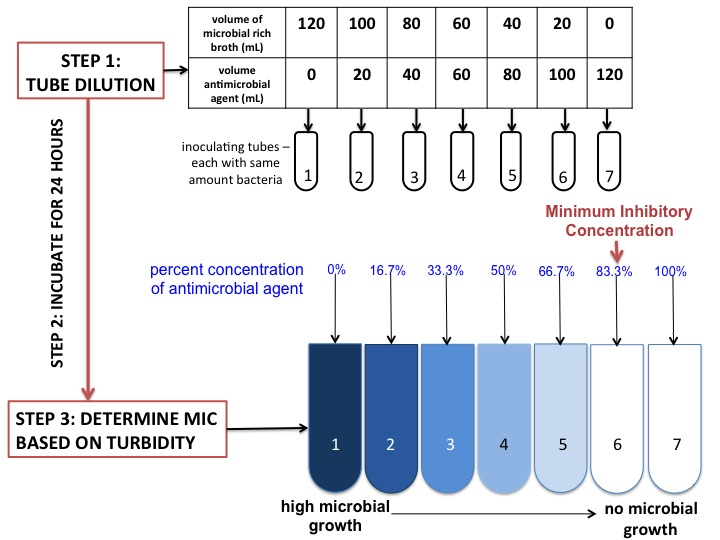
Broth dilution assay. The MIC is determined by examining tubes containing the microbe and a dilution series of antimicrobial agent for turbidity.

There are three main reagents necessary to run this assay: the media, an antimicrobial agent, and the microbe being tested. The most commonly used media is cation-adjusted Mueller Hinton Broth, due to its ability to support the growth of most pathogens and its lack of inhibitors towards common antibiotics. Depending on the pathogen and antibiotics being tested, the media can be changed and/or adjusted. The antimicrobial concentration is adjusted into the correct concentration by mixing stock antimicrobial with media. The adjusted antimicrobial is serially diluted into multiple tubes (or wells) to obtain a gradient. The dilution rate can be adjusted depending on the breakpoint and the practitioner's needs. The microbe, or the inoculating agent, must come from the same colony-forming unit, and must be at the correct concentration. This may be adjusted by incubation time and dilution. For verification, the positive control is plated in a hundred fold dilution to count colony forming units. The microbes inoculate the tubes (or plate) and are incubated for 16–20 hours. The MIC is generally determined by turbidity.

=== Etest ===
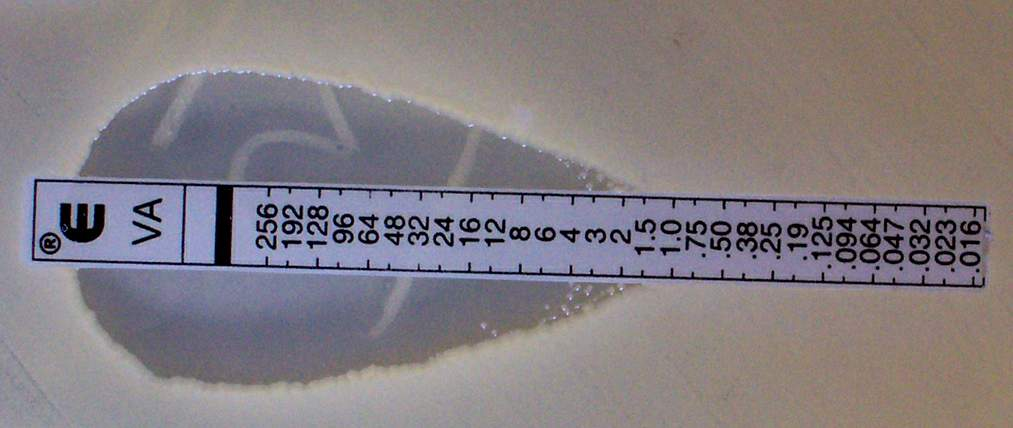
Etest. After the required incubation period, when an even lawn of growth is distinctly visible, the MIC value is read where the pointed end of the inhibition ellipse intersects the side of the strip.

Etests can be used as an alternative method to determine the minimum inhibitory concentrations of a wide range of antimicrobial agents against different organisms. They have been widely used in microbiology laboratories around the world. Manufactured by bioMérieux, Etests are a ready-to-use, non-porous plastic reagent strip with a predefined gradient of antibiotic, covering a continuous concentration range.

== MBC testing ==
While the MIC is the lowest concentration of an antibacterial or antifungal agent necessary to inhibit visible growth, the minimum bactericidal concentration (MBC) is the minimum concentration of an antibacterial agent that results in bacterial death. It is defined by the inability to re-culture bacteria, and the closer the MIC is to the MBC, the more bactericidal the compound.

MIC is used clinically over MBC because MIC is more easily determined. In addition, drug effectiveness is generally similar when taken at both MIC and MBC concentrations because the host immune system can expel the pathogen when bacterial proliferation is at a standstill. When the MBC is much higher than the MIC, drug toxicity makes taking the MBC of the drug detrimental to patients. Antimicrobial toxicity can come in many forms, such as immune hypersensitivity and off-target toxicity.

== Importance ==
Increasing bacterial outbreaks and newer strains of microbes and pathogens invading our lives daily, there is an increasing need to test these microbes. Mutating bacteria pose a higher risk to humans than ever and thus the MIC Test is important to ensure we are one step ahead of them.

== See also ==
- Kirby–Bauer test
- Arthur Thomas Palin, pioneer in drinking water chlorination treatment and testing
