= European Committee on Antimicrobial Susceptibility Testing =

Scientific committee

- Type: Nonprofit organization
- Founded: May 25, 1997; 29 years ago
- Headquarters: EUCAST Development Laboratory, Central Hospital Växjö, Sweden
- Area served: Worldwide
- Key people: Christian Giske (Chairman); John Turnidge (Scientific Secretary)
- Website: eucast.org

The European Committee on Antimicrobial Susceptibility Testing (EUCAST) is a scientific committee for defining guidelines to interpret antimicrobial resistance. It was formed in 1997 and is jointly organized by ESCMID, ECDC and other European laboratories.

EUCAST guidelines are one of the most popular breakpoint guidelines used in antimicrobial susceptibility testing worldwide. The EUCAST guidelines are freely available to all of their users.

Like the Clinical and Laboratory Standards Institute, EUCAST offers guidelines to interpret raw minimum inhibitory concentrations (MICs), the lowest concentration of a chemical, usually a drug, which prevents visible growth of bacterium. The interpretation to antimicrobial resistance (reported as "R") or antimicrobial susceptibility (reported as "S") differs for all bug-drug combinations which is why guidelines are needed.
