= Clinical and Laboratory Standards Institute =

Laboratory standards development organization

The Clinical and Laboratory Standards Institute (CLSI) is a volunteer-driven, membership-supported, not-for-profit, standards development organization. CLSI promotes the development and use of voluntary laboratory consensus standards and guidelines within the health care community.

== History ==
Brochure for the 1977 Conference on a National Understanding for the Development of Reference Methods and Materials for Clinical Chemistry

In 1968, 31 clinicians and laboratory scientists representing 15 organizations convened to establish a formal consensus process for standardization. In 1977, CLSI was accredited by the American National Standards Institute (ANSI) as a voluntary consensus standards organization. Around the same time, CLSI became the home of the National Reference System for the Clinical Laboratory (NRSCL), a collection of reference systems intended to improve the comparability of test results, consistent with medical practice needs.

CLSI is a global association with over 1,500 member organizations and individual members, along with more than 2,000 volunteers. Until 2005, CLSI was known as the National Committee for Clinical Laboratory Standards (NCCLS).

== Committees ==
CLSI documents are developed by committees consisting of experts in medical testing or related aspects. Each CLSI committee produces consensus documents related to a specific discipline.

== The Consensus Process ==
CLSI's core focus is the development of globally applicable voluntary consensus standards and guidelines for the clinical laboratory. This is achieved through an accredited consensus process.

== Volunteers ==
CLSI relies on more than 2,000 volunteers. Volunteers and mentors also collaborate with CLSI's Global Health Partnerships to help establish laboratory quality management systems in resource-limited countries.

== Global Health Partnerships ==
CLSI provides direct assistance in Sub-Saharan Africa to combat HIV/AIDS and other infectious diseases. With grants from the US-based PEPFAR (President's Emergency Plan for AIDS Relief) program administered by a cooperative agreement from the Centers for Disease Control and Prevention (CDC) and the National Institute of Allergy and Infectious Diseases (NIAID), CLSI has worked on essential laboratory services. CLSI has provided technical assistance in Côte d'Ivoire, Democratic Republic of the Congo, Dominican Republic, Ethiopia, Georgia, Ghana, Kazakhstan, Kenya, Kyrgyzstan, Malawi, Mali, Mozambique, Namibia, Nigeria, Peru, Rwanda, Tajikistan, Tanzania, Ukraine, Vietnam, and Zambia.

== International Organization for Standardization (ISO) ==
CLSI participates in the development of international standards as the Secretariat of ISO Technical Committee (TC) 212, clinical laboratory testing and in vitro diagnostic test systems. This responsibility was delegated to CLSI by the American National Standards Institute (ANSI), an ISO member body. CLSI also serves as the administrator for the US Technical Advisory Committee (TAG) for ISO/TC 212.

== See also ==
- Technical standard
- International standards
- PEPFAR
