= Çevik =

Çevik is a Turkish name and may refer to:

== Given name ==
- Çevik Bir (born 1939), Turkish general

== Surname ==
- Fatmagül Çevik (born 2005), Turkish female weightlifter
- Hakan Çevik (born 1976), Turkish Paralympic rifle shooter
- İlayda Çevik (born 1994), Turkish actress
- Müge Çevik, physician
- Okan Çevik (born 1966), Turkish basketball coach
- Özgür Çevik (born 1981), Turkish singer
- Ramazan Çevik (born 1992), Turkish-Belgian footballer
- Suzan Çevik (born 1977), Turkish female Paralympic pistol shooter
- Tolga Çevik (born 1974), Turkish actor
- Yaşar Halit Çevik (born 1955), Turkish diplomat
- Zafer Çevik (born 1984), Turkish footballer

== Places ==
- Çevik, Taşköprü, a village in Turkey
