= European Society of Clinical Microbiology and Infectious Diseases =

Swiss-based scientific international organization

- ESCMID logo
- Abbreviation: ESCMID
- Formation: 12 February 1983; 43 years ago
- Headquarters: Basel, Switzerland
- Region served: Europe
- Fields: Medical microbiology, infectious diseases
- Members: 15,000 (2026)
- President: Jon S. Friedland (since 2026)
- Affiliations: EUCAST
- Website: www.escmid.org

The European Society of Clinical Microbiology and Infectious Diseases (ESCMID), formerly known as European Society of Clinical Microbiology (ESCM), is a non-profit international organisation with headquarters in Basel, Switzerland. Clinical Microbiology and Infection is the official peer-reviewed journal published by ESCMID. In April 2026 British physician Jon S. Friedland began a two-year term as president of the organisation. An important activity of the society is the organization of the annual scientific congress ESCMID Global (formerly known as ECCMID).

== History ==
The organisation was founded on 12 February 1983 as the European Society of Clinical Microbiology (ESCM). In 1990 it was renamed European Society of Clinical Microbiology and Infectious Diseases (ESCMID).

== Governance and description ==
ESCMID is headquartered in Basel, Switzerland.

The main governance organ is the executive committee (EC), which is elected by ESCMID members, and divided further into several subcommittees with specific functions. As of June 2026 the Executive Committee members included president Jon S. Friedland, President-elect & Secretary General Jan Kluytmans, and Robert Leo Skov Immediate Past President & Treasurer), among others.

The Assembly of Members takes place at the annual ESCMID Global, which serves as a forum for discussion and resolution of professional matters of common interest. The EC elects a president for a two-year term.

British physician Jon S. Friedland has been president of ESCMID since April 2026, when he took over from Robert Skov.

As of August 2026, ESCMID has around 15,000 members. In addition, through 77 national and international affiliated societies, a further 45,000 affiliated members.

== Activities ==
=== Guidelines ===
ESCMID also promotes the development and dissemination of clinical and laboratory practice guidelines according to the principles of evidence-based medicine, to harmonize European diagnostic, therapeutic, and infection control procedures. Main operational procedures for guideline development are reported in the ESCMID manual for clinical practice guidelines and other guidance documents. Examples of recently published documents focused on drug treatment and clinical management of COVID-19, Lyme disease, Sepsis, Clostridioides difficile infection.

=== ESCMID study groups ===
ESCMID study groups are special interest groups consisting of society members who are involved in the study of specific areas of clinical microbiology and infectious diseases. The study groups are involved in proposing scientific symposia, educational workshops, and meet-the-expert sessions for ECCMID, proposing educational courses/workshops, and publishing scientific articles in ESCMID's name. During the COVID-19 pandemic, several study groups began producing virtual content, such as web-symposia series or online conferences.

=== ESCMID Global ===
An important activity of the society is the organization of the annual scientific congress ESCMID Global.

The congress began as a biannual event, known as ECCMID with about 1,500 participants at its inaugural occurrence in 1983. It became an annual event in 2000, and it has grown since then, now attracting over 16,000 participants annually. More than 5,000 scientific abstracts are submitted for inclusion each year by researchers from multiple countries. The most recent ESCMID Global was held in April 2026 in a hybrid format, both online and onsite, in Munich, Germany.

ESCMID Global is recognized as the largest international forum for presentations and discussions of research in the fields of clinical microbiology and infection for academic, clinical, and industry experts. The first European Congress of Clinical Microbiology (ECCM) was organized in 1983 in Bologna, Italy. After the inclusion of infectious diseases in the late 1980s, the first ECCMID was held in 1991 in Oslo, Norway. Initially a biannual congress, ESCMID Global has been an annual event since 2000. Since its initiation with around 1,500 participants, the congress has grown and now attracts around 14,000 participants every year. The number of submitted abstracts has risen to over 5,000, of which roughly 70% are accepted for oral or poster presentation. A large pharmaceutical exhibition site alongside a broad-based program in clinical microbiology and infectious diseases.

In 2024 the name of the congress was changed from ECCMID (European Congress of Clinical Microbiology and Infectious Diseases) to ESCMID Global.

=== Journal ===
Clinical Microbiology and Infection (CMI) is the official peer-reviewed ESCMID publication, which publishes monthly issues and additional supplements devoted to special themes. The scope of the journal comprises basic and applied research relevant to therapy and diagnostics in the fields of microbiology, infectious diseases, virology, parasitology, immunology, and epidemiology as related to these fields.

=== Professional affairs ===
ESCMID supports the career development of members by creating a platform for them to connect with experienced professionals in their field.

One such activity is the Observership program, which allows infectious diseases specialists and clinical microbiologists to visit renowned centers outside their country.

The Mentorship program is accessible to full ESCMID and young scientist members, who can receive guidance for research and career development from a senior ESCMID member.

The ESCMID Parity Commission was founded to review and improve representation of minorities as well as gender and geographical balance in the society's fields of expertise.

The Trainee Association of ESCMID (TAE) aims at widening career opportunities for young scientists at the beginning of their careers. Among other professional affairs activities are the cooperation with other organizations in clinical microbiology and infectious diseases; Collaboration with relevant sections of the European Union of Medical Specialists (UEMS); Professional policy issues in the fields of clinical microbiology and infectious diseases; Matters relating to professional training, mobility and recruitment; Equal opportunities; Trainees' issues.

=== Awards and grants ===
ESCMID supports young clinicians and researchers as well as established scholars with awards and grants to acknowledge past achievements and provide an incentive for future accomplishments. ESCMID supports its members' research projects and training with around seven hundred thousand euros every year.

== See also ==
- Infectious Diseases Society of America
- European Federation of Biotechnology
- International Society for Infectious Diseases
- The Journal of Infectious Diseases
- European Journal of Clinical Microbiology & Infectious Diseases
