= Müge =

- Gender: Female
- Language: Turkish

Origin
- Language: French
- Meaning: "Lily of the valley"

Müge is a feminine Turkish given name referring to the lily of the valley flower. The word 'müge' is believed to be derived from the French word 'muguet', which also means lily of the valley.

== People ==
=== Given name ===
- Müge Anlı (born 1973), Turkish television presenter and journalist
- Müge Boz (born 1984), Turkish actress
- Müge Çevik, Turkish-British physician
- Müge İplikçi (born 1966), Turkish journalist and radio presenter

=== Middle name ===
- Fatma Müge Göçek, Turkish sociologist

== See also ==
- Muge (surname)
