= Jonathan Friedland =

British physician and medical researcher

Jonathan Friedland FRCP FRCPE FRCPI FMedSci
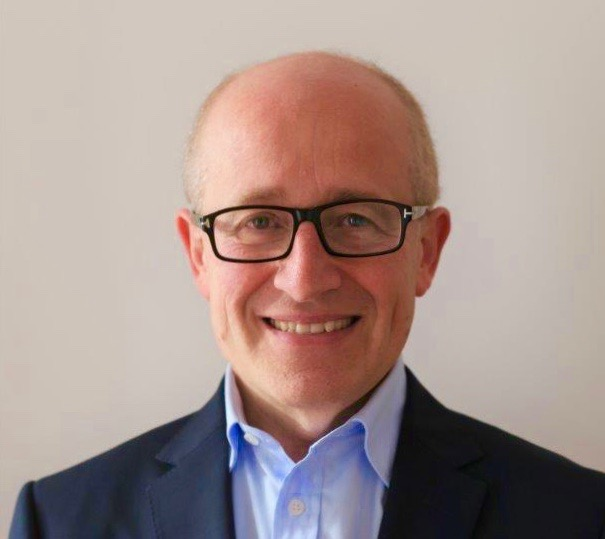
- Born: Jonathan Samuel Friedland; London
- Education: University of Cambridge; King's College Hospital
- Awards: Weber-Parkes Prize, Royal College of Physicians of London (2005)
- Scientific career
- Fields: Infectious diseases
- Workplaces: St George's, University of London; Imperial College London

Jonathan Samuel Friedland FRCP FRCPE FRCPI FMedSci is a British physician and medical researcher. As of June 2026 he is professor of infectious diseases at City St George's, University of London, and since April 2026 has served as president of the European Society of Clinical Microbiology and Infectious Diseases (ESCMID).

== Early life and education ==
Jonathan Samuel Friedland, the son of Albert and Rosalind Friedland, was born in London.

Friedland earned a BA and MA at the University of Cambridge and a medical degree (MBBS) and a PhD at the University of London. He also studied medicine at and King's College Hospital. He completed his junior medical training at the Royal Brompton Hospital, the Royal Postgraduate Medical School, and the John Radcliffe Hospital in Oxford.

Friedland later undertook a Clinical Research Fellowship funded by the Medical Research Council at St George's, University of London.

== Career ==
=== Academia ===
Friedland was appointed senior lecturer at the Royal Postgraduate Medical School and honorary consultant in infectious disease at the Hammersmith Hospital.

In 2004, he became professor of infectious diseases and head of infectious diseases and immunity at the Royal Postgraduate Medical School, later Imperial College London. He served as Director (formerly Dean) of the Hammersmith campus, Imperial College London, from 2010. Friedland maintained an active clinical practice as honorary consultant in infectious diseases and Medicine, Imperial College Healthcare (formerly Hammersmith Hospitals) NHS Trust, from 1994 to 2018, and served as chief of clinical service from 2004 to 2013.

In 2018, Friedland joined St George's, University of London as Deputy Vice-Chancellor (research and enterprise) and Professor of Infectious Diseases. Following the merger of City and St George’s, University of London, he became Vice-President (research & innovation).

=== Regulatory and advisory roles ===
Friedland has held numerous regulatory and advisory positions. He is a non-executive board member of the UK Health Security Agency (2022–), where he chairs the Science & Research Committee and sits on the Audit & Risk Committee.

He chaired the MHRA Expert Working Group on COVID-19 Therapeutics from 2020 to 2023 and served as Vice-Chair of the Commission on Human Medicines (2014–22). Friedland also chaired the MHRA Expert Advisory Group on Infection from 2015 to 2022.

During the COVID-19 pandemic, he was a member of the COVID-19 Vaccine Safety Surveillance Methodologies Expert Working Group. He had previously served on the Joint Committee on Vaccination and Immunisation and, from 2007 to 2012, on the National Expert Panel on New and Emerging Infections (NEPNEI), which was established in 2003 "to provide independent expert advice to the England Chief Medical Officer (CMO) on the public health risk from new and emerging infections".

=== Other memberships and roles ===
Friedland was president of the British Infection Association from 2007 to 2009.

In 2020, he was elected to the executive committee of the European Society of Clinical Microbiology and Infectious Diseases (ESCMID), initially taking up the role of scientific affairs secretary. He has held various other roles within ESCMID, including serving on the programme committee of ESCMID Global, the largest infection conference in the world. In 2024, he was appointed ESCMID secretary general and president-elect. In April 2026 he was appointed president of ESCMID.

== Research ==
Friedland's research is focused on innate immune responses and particularly the role of matrix metalloproteinases in the immunopathology of tuberculosis and the development of host-directed therapy. He also has long-standing research interests in migrant health as well as in new TB diagnostics. Friedland has published over 250 peer reviewed papers, invited editorials and reviews as well as three books.

He was a member of the Medical Research Council Clinical Training and Career Development Panel from 2009 to 2013.

== Awards ==
In 2005 his research team won the Medical Futures Innovations Award for best overall innovation.

In 2005, Friedland was awarded the Royal College of Physicians' Weber-Parkes Prize Medal for research in tuberculosis.

He was elected Fellow of the Academy of Medical Sciences in 2008 and a Fellow of the Royal College of Physicians of Ireland in 2010. In 2017, he was awarded an inaugural Fellowship of the European Society of Clinical Microbiology and Infectious Diseases (ESCMID).

== Chess ==
Friedland enjoys playing chess. Friedland was the Cambridge University Chess Champion, and represented Cambridge in the 97th-99th Varsity Chess Matches. He was awarded 'Best Cambridge Game' for his match in the 98th. In 2004 Friedland achieved the title of Candidate Master (CM) and won the Chess Blitz Championship Gold Medal in the 2018 Mind Sports Olympiad.
