= Patience Mlisana Koleka =

South African researcher and professor

Professor Patience Mlisana Koleka
- Citizenship: South Africa
- Occupation: Researcher. Academic

Academic background
- Education: University of KwaZulu-Natal

Academic work
- Discipline: Medical Microbiology
- Institutions: National Health Laboratory Service

Patience Mlisana Koleka is a South African researcher and professor of medical microbiology at University of Kwazulu-Natal. She currently serves as the chief executive officer of the National Health Laboratory Service(NHLS).

== Background ==
Patience Mlisana Koleka was born in East London in South Africa, but she had a major part of her growing up in Mthatha, in the Eastern Cape province. Mlisana holds an MBChB, MMedPath (Micro) and a PhD from the University of KwaZulu-Natal.

== Career ==
Patience Mlisana Koleka is a microbiologist, Professor and Head of both the Medical Microbiology Department at the University of KwaZulu Natal (UKZN) and National Health Laboratory Services. She also held the position of executive manager of academic affairs, research, and quality assurance at the National Health Laboratory Services (NHLS) since July 2018.

She serves as a member of the Ministerial Advisory Committee(MAC) on antimicrobial resistance and chair of the pathology/laboratory sub-committee during the Covid-19 pandemic. She later on became a co-chair of the MAC.

She currently serves as the chief executive officer of the National Health Laboratory Service(NHLS)

== Publications ==
- Organisation of care for people receiving drug-resistant tuberculosis treatment in South Africa: a mixed methods study
- Consequences of rpoB mutations missed by the GenoType MTBDRplus assay in a programmatic setting in South Africa
- Data for SARS-CoV-2 Reinfection Trends in South Africa: Monthly Report (2022-12-07)
- Emergence of SARS-CoV-2 Omicron lineages BA.4 and BA.5 in South Africa
