= Müge Çevik =

Physician, infectious disease researcher and science communicator

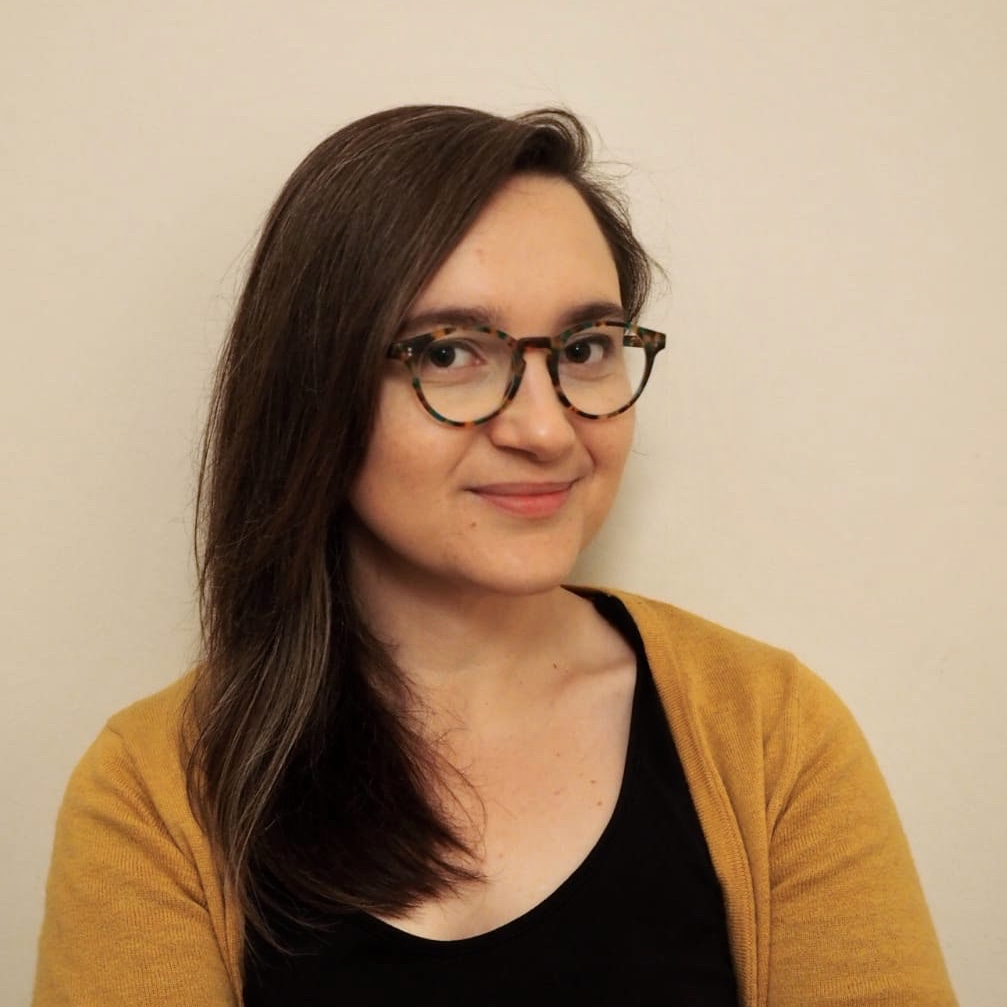
- Citizenship: Turkey and United Kingdom
- Education: Ege University; London School of Hygiene & Tropical Medicine; University College London
- Known for: Medical virology Science communication
- Scientific career
- Workplaces: University of St Andrews; Chelsea and Westminster Hospital

Müge Çevik is a physician who is an infectious diseases researcher and science communicator at the University of St Andrews. Her research considers HIV, viral hepatitis, emerging infections and tropical infections in developing countries. During the COVID-19 pandemic, Çevik was an advisor to the Chief Medical Officer of Scotland and the World Health Organization, and is a member of New and Emerging Respiratory Virus Threats Advisory Group - an expert committee of the UK Department of Health advising Scientific Advisory Group for Emergencies.

== Early life and education ==
She studied medicine at the Ege University Faculty of Medicine in Turkey. As a medical student, Çevik was involved with projects and youth organisations related to sexual health. She served on the executive committee of the International Federation of Medical Students' Associations committee on reproductive health. Çevik secured funding from the United States Embassy Youth Empowerment Grants to study HIV related stigma in health care settings. As a result of her advocacy, Çevik was invited to join the UNAIDS programme coordinating board meeting.

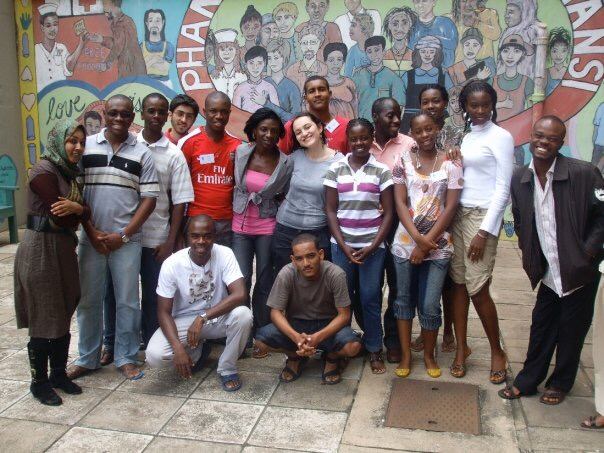
Çevik leading international peer-education programmes during her medical degree.

She then moved to England and completed a master's degree in public health at the London School of Hygiene & Tropical Medicine and University College London. Çevik completed her specialist training in internal medicine and doctoral research at the University of St Andrews.

== Research and career ==
In 2016 Çevik joined NHS Lothian as a Senior Registrar in infectious diseases. Her research considers HIV and tuberculosis. Çevik is leading a phase 3 clinical trial that looks to reduce the treatment time for patients with drug resistant tuberculosis. In 2020 she was awarded a Clinical Academic Training Fellowship, supported by the Chief Scientist Office Scotland, to establish the biological mechanisms that underpin a poor response to tuberculosis treatment in patients in Kampala.

=== Leadership during the COVID-19 pandemic ===
During the COVID-19 pandemic Çevik served an advisor to the Chief Medical Officer of Scotland and the World Health Organization, and she was a member of New and Emerging Respiratory Virus Threats Advisory Group - an expert committee of the UK Department of Health advising Scientific Advisory Group for Emergencies.

Throughout the pandemic she provided expert commentary to the public about coronavirus disease. Çevik made use of Twitter to keep the public up-to-date with coronavirus-related research.

Working with Colin McCowan, Cevik investigated household transmission of SARS-CoV-2 in Scotland. Working with the International Severe Acute Respiratory and emerging Infection Consortium (ISARIC), Çevik has looked to transfer clinical studies related to coronavirus disease to developing countries. She created a series of guidelines for clinicians outlining how they should respond to SARS-CoV-2. As part of her work with ISARIC, Çevik looks to identify the risk factors for severe illness in patients with Comorbidities such as HIV. She works with ISARIC on rapid scientific reviews that can inform government policy. Writing in the BMJ, Çevik highlighted the importance of ensuring HIV status and testing is included in the management of COVID-19.

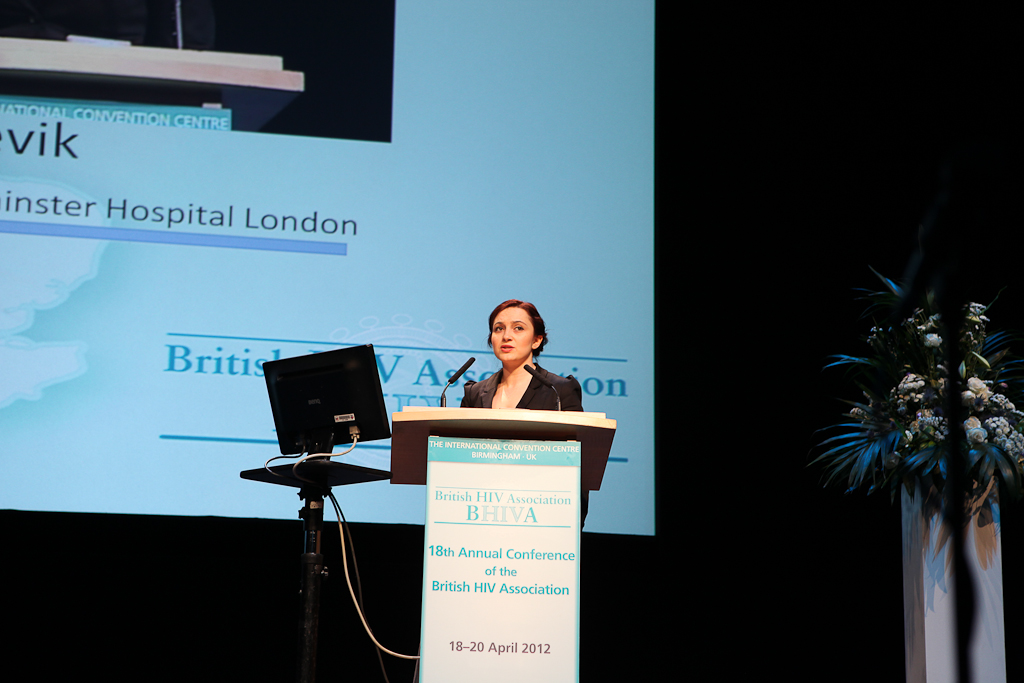
Çevik presenting at the British HIV Association Conference (2012)

=== Academic service ===
Çevik is Associate Editor of the Elsevier journal Clinical Microbiology and Infection. She serves on the steering committee of the European Society of Clinical Microbiology and Infectious Diseases (ESCMID).

Alongside her academic research, Çevik is interested in science communication and how physicians can best use social media to disseminate their research. She has made use of social media network analysis to understand how scientists and physicians use Twitter.

== Selected works and publications ==
- Vispo, Eugenia; Cevik, Muge; Rockstroh, Juergen K.; Barreiro, Pablo; Nelson, Mark; Scourfield, Andrew; Boesecke, Christoph; Wasmuth, Jan-Christian; Soriano, Vincent (15 April 2013). "Genetic Determinants of Idiopathic Noncirrhotic Portal Hypertension in HIV-Infected Patients". Clinical Infectious Diseases. 56 (8): 1117–1122. doi:10.1093/cid/cit001. ISSN 1058-4838. PMID 23315321.
- Cevik, Muge (1 October 2019). "Social media to engage, communicate and interact". Clinical Microbiology and Infection. 25 (10): 1165–1166. doi:10.1016/j.cmi.2019.07.012. ISSN 1198-743X. PMID 31349004.
- Cevik, Muge; Moncayo-Nieto, Olga; Evans, Margeret (23 September 2019). "Non-typeable Haemophilus influenzae-associated early pregnancy loss: an emerging neonatal and maternal pathogen". Infection. 48 (2): 285–288. doi:10.1007/s15010-019-01359-6. PMC 7292808. PMID 31549360.
- Cevik, Muge; Bamford, Connor; Ho, Antonia (25 April 2020). "COVID-19 pandemic – A focused review for clinicians". Clinical Microbiology and Infection. 26 (7): 842–847. doi:10.1016/j.cmi.2020.04.023. ISSN 1198-743X. PMC 7182753. PMID 32344166.
