= Jacques F. Acar =

French doctor (1931–2020)

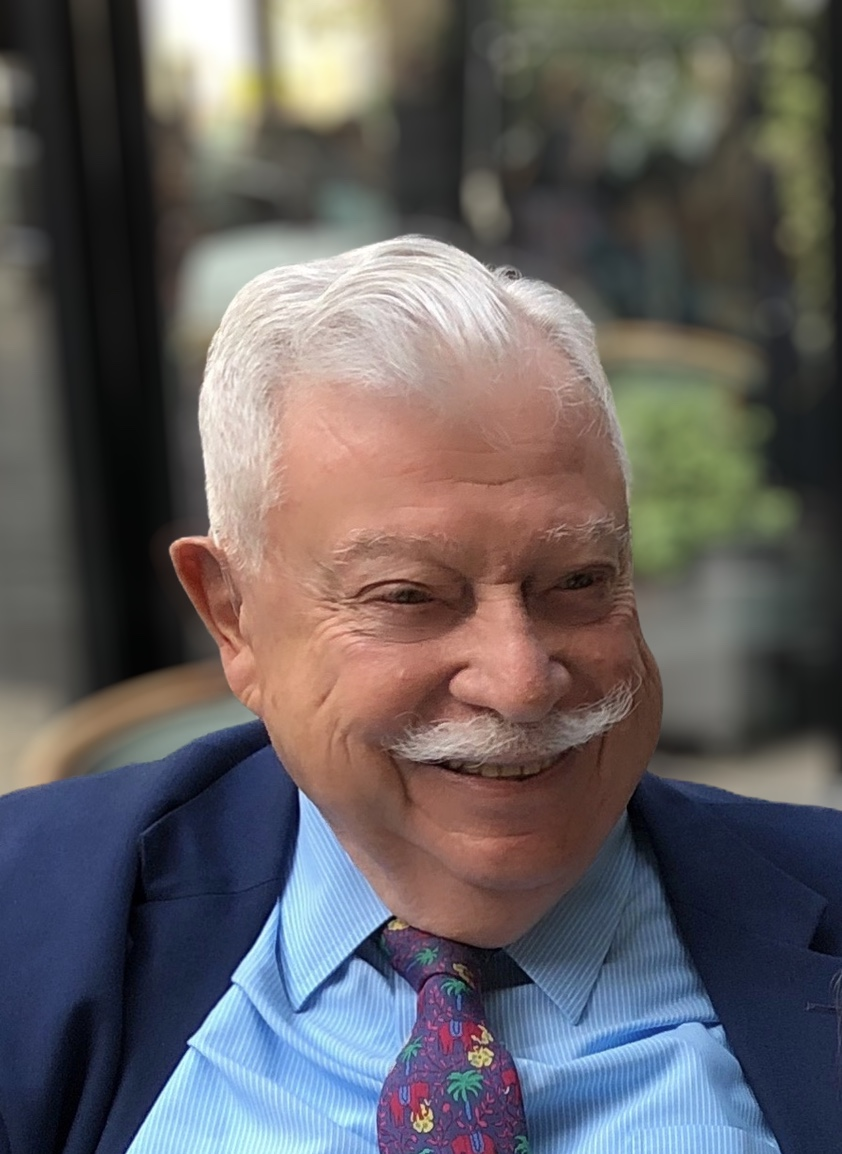
- Born: Jacques Fouad Acar; 13 April 1931; Dakar, French West Africa
- Died: 27 March 2020 (aged 88); Paris, France
- Occupation: Doctor

Jacques Fouad Acar (13 April 1931 – 27 March 2020) was a French doctor of Lebanese descent and microbiologist who specialized in antibiotics.

== Biography ==
Acar left Senegal in 1948 for his studies at the Faculté de médecine de Paris. He graduated in 1954 and completed his military service as a field doctor in sub-Saharan Africa. He was appointed head of the clinic for infectious diseases at the Bichat–Claude Bernard Hospital in Paris in 1962.

In 1966, Acar became head of the Department of Medical Microbiology and Infectious Diseases at the Hôpital Saint-Joseph in Paris, staying there until 1999. At the same time, he was head of Medical Microbiology at the Hôpital Broussais. He was a professor of medical microbiology at Pierre and Marie Curie University from 1973 until 1980, and was head of that department from 1980 to 2000.

Acar was President of the World Health Organization's taskforce on antimicrobial resistance from 1992 to 1996. He served as editor-in-chief of Clinical Microbiology and Infection from 1995 to 2000, and an expert for the World Organisation for Animal Health from 1999 until his death. In 2015, he became part of a taskforce of the French Ministry of Health for antimicrobial resistance.

After a vacation in the United States, Acar was hospitalized on 22 March 2020, and died of COVID-19 on 27 March. His death was widely mourned in the scientific world, including many of his former students and colleagues, such as Didier Raoult.

Throughout his career, Jacques F. Acar organized seminars and teachings in more than 20 countries around the world. He was the author of more than 500 publications.
