= Journal of Infection =

- Discipline: Infectious disease
- Language: English
- Edited by: Robert C. Read

Publication details
- History: 1979–present
- Publisher: Saunders
- Frequency: Monthly
- Impact factor: 14.3 (2023)

Standard abbreviations
- ISO 4: J. Infect.

Indexing
- CODEN: JINFD2
- ISSN: 0163-4453 (print); 1532-2742 (web)
- OCLC no.: 04392967

Links
- Journal homepage; Online access; Online archive; Journal page on publisher's website

The Journal of Infection is a monthly peer-reviewed medical journal in the field of infectious disease, covering microbiology, epidemiology and clinical infectious disease medicine. Established in 1979, the journal was initially published quarterly by Academic Press. The first editor was Hillas Smith. The Journal of Infection is the official publication of the British Infection Association (formerly the British Infection Society and the British Society for the Study of Infection). Since 2006, the editor-in-chief has been Robert C. Read, an infectious disease physician and Chair of Infectious Diseases at the University of Southampton, and the publisher is Elsevier.

== Abstracting and indexing ==
The journal is abstracted and indexed in:

- Academic OneFile
- CAB Abstracts
- Chemical Abstracts
- CINAHL
- Current Contents/Life Sciences
- Elsevier BIOBASE
- Embase
- Global Health
- Index Medicus/MEDLINE/PubMed
- Science Citation Index
- Scopus
- Tropical Diseases Bulletin

In 2023, the Journal Citation Reports indicated that the Journal of Infection had an impact factor of 14.3 and a Journal Citation Indicator (JCI) of 2.80, with nearly 14,000 article citations that year. In the "Infectious Diseases" category, the Journal of Infection was ranked third based on its impact factor, with Lancet Infectious Diseases and Lancet Microbe ranking higher.
