= Peter Horby =

British physician and epidemiologist

Sir Peter Horby
- Born: Peter William Horby
- Education: University College London (MBBS); London School of Hygiene and Tropical Medicine (PhD)
- Scientific career
- Workplaces: University of Oxford
- Thesis: Avian, inter-pandemic, and pandemic influenza in Vietnam
- Doctoral advisor: Neal Alexander
- Website: www.ndm.ox.ac.uk/team/peter-horby

Sir Peter William Horby is a British physician, epidemiologist, Moh Family Foundation Professor of Emerging Infections and Global Health, and Director of the Pandemic Sciences Institute at the University of Oxford. He is the founder, and former director of the Oxford University Clinical Research Unit in Hanoi, Vietnam which was founded in 2006. In 2014, Horby established the Epidemic Research Group Oxford (ERGO). ERGO incorporates a number of international projects such as the European Commission funded PREPARE, the African coaLition for Epidemic Research, Response and Training (ALERRT), and the International Severe Acute Respiratory and emerging Infection Consortium (ISARIC). Since 2016, Horby has been chair and executive director of ISARIC.

Horby specialises in emerging and epidemic infectious diseases. He is the co-chief investigator of the RECOVERY Trial into drugs for COVID-19 (the largest clinical trial of COVID-19 in the world) alongside Martin Landray. In June 2020, he gave a statement at 10 Downing Street alongside the Prime Minister and Chief Scientific Adviser announcing the first positive trial results of the first life-saving COVID-19 drug, Dexamethasone. He is the primary author on the published preliminary report.

From 2020 to 2022, Horby was one of the attendees of the Scientific Advisory Group for Emergencies (SAGE) He is the chair of the New and Emerging Respiratory Virus Threats Advisory Group (NERVTAG).

Horby was knighted in the 2021 Birthday Honours for services to medical research. Also in 2021, he was elected a Fellow of the Academy of Medical Sciences and in 2024 a Fellow of the Royal Society.
