= Martin Landray =

British epidemiologist and professor (born c. 1968)

Sir Martin Landray
- Born: c. 1968 (age 57–58)
- Education: Abingdon School; University of Birmingham
- Scientific career
- Workplaces: University of Oxford
- Website: www.bdi.ox.ac.uk/Team/martin-landray

Sir Martin Jonathan Landray (born c. 1968) is a British physician, epidemiologist and data scientist who serves as a Professor of Medicine & Epidemiology at the University of Oxford. Landray designs, conducts and analyses large-scale randomised control trials; including practice-changing international trials that have recruited over 100,000 individuals. Landray previously led the health informatics team that enabled the collection and management of data for the UK Biobank on over half a million people.

== Early life and education ==
Landray was born the son of a general practitioner, Bob Landray and an anaesthetist, Margaret Bray. He was educated at Abingdon School in Abingdon-on-Thames, Oxfordshire, from 1982 until 1987. He was a prefect and played rugby and cricket. After Abingdon he went on to study medicine at the University of Birmingham, returning later for specialist training in Clinical Pharmacology & Therapeutics, and General Internal Medicine.

== Career ==
Landray serves as co-chief investigator of the RECOVERY Trial into treatment drugs for COVID-19 (the largest such clinical trial in the world) alongside Peter Horby. In June 2020, the trial discovered the first known life-saving COVID-19 drug, Dexamethasone. The trial also showed that Tocilizumab further reduces the risk of death for the sickest patients with COVID-19. The trial found that a number of other treatments had no meaningful benefits for patients hospitalised with COVID-19, including Hydroxychloroquine, Lopinavir/ritonavir, Azithromycin, Convalescent plasma, and Colchicine. The trial continues to study REGN-COV2 and Baricitinib.

He leads the Good Clinical Trials Collaborative, established by Wellcome Trust, Bill & Melinda Gates Foundation, and African Academy of Sciences which seeks to develop and promote the adoption of new international guidelines for randomised control trials. He was previously one of the leaders of the Clinical Trial Transformation Initiative's risk-based monitoring, quality-by-design, and mobile clinical trial projects. He is an advocate of streamlined approaches to clinical trial design, delivery and regulation as a means to improve healthcare. He is founding director and chair of NHS DigiTrials, the Health Data Research Hub for Clinical Trials hosted by NHS Digital, and leads the clinical trials theme for Health Data Research UK.

In 2021, Landray was appointed to the Pandemic Preparedness Partnership (PPP), a group chaired by Patrick Vallance to advise the G7 presidency held by the government of Prime Minister Boris Johnson. He was elected a Fellow of the Academy of Medical Sciences in the same year.

He was knighted in the 2021 Birthday Honours for services to public health and science.

== Positions held ==
Landray holds the following positions:

- Professor of Medicine & Epidemiology, Nuffield Department of Population Health, University of Oxford
- Deputy Director, Big Data Institute, University of Oxford
- Lead, Big Data & Computing Innovation, MRC Population Health Research Unit
- Lead, Clinical Informatics & Big Data, NIHR Oxford Biomedical Research Centre
- Honorary Consultant Physician, Oxford University Hospitals NHS Foundation Trust

== See also ==
- List of Old Abingdonians
