= Choices (journal) =

- Discipline: Economics
- Language: English
- Edited by: Alison Davis, Kynda Curtis

Publication details
- History: 1986–present
- Publisher: Agricultural & Applied Economics Association
- Frequency: Quarterly
- Open access: Yes

Standard abbreviations
- ISO 4: Choices (Ames)

Indexing
- ISSN: 0886-5558 (print); 2162-2884 (web)

Links
- Journal homepage

Choices is an online peer-reviewed magazine published by the Agricultural & Applied Economics Association (AAEA) for readers interested in the policy and management of agriculture, the food industry, natural resources, rural communities, and the environment. Choices is published quarterly and is available free online. It is currently one of three outreach products offered by AAEA, along with the more timely Policy Issues and the forthcoming Shared Materials section of the AAEA Web site.

== Format ==
Choices was founded in 1986 as a print magazine. In 2002, the print version was discontinued and it was published solely online thereafter.

Each issue typically contains eight articles divided among two overarching themes. A guest editor is selected for each theme, who helps organize and edit the articles for that issue. Articles may also be submitted directly, independent of any theme. These articles were previously published under the heading of Grab Bag and are now called Submitted Articles.

== Editors ==
The current Editors of Choices are Maria Marshall, Purdue University and Alison Davis, University of Kentucky. The Technical Editor is Amy Bekkerman, Precision Edits.
