= Dysbiosis =

Changes in microbiota leading to disease

- Other names: dysbacteriosis
- Treatment: Fecal Microbiota Transplantation, antibiotics, Probiotics

Dysbiosis (also called dysbacteriosis) is characterized by a disruption to the microbiome resulting in an imbalance in the microbiota, changes in their functional composition and metabolic activities, or a shift in their local distribution. For example, a part of the human microbiota such as the skin flora, gut flora, or vaginal flora, can become deranged (unbalanced), when normally dominating species become underrepresented and species that normally are outcompeted or contained increase to fill the void. Due to perceived implications in diverse diseases, there has been a rapid growth in research and innovation interest in different approaches to counteract dysbiosis. Similar to the human gut microbiome, diverse microbes colonize the plant rhizosphere, and dysbiosis in the rhizosphere, can negatively impact plant health. Dysbiosis is most commonly reported as a condition in the gastrointestinal tract or plant rhizosphere.

Typical microbial colonies found on or in the body are benign or beneficial. These appropriately sized microbial colonies carry out a series of helpful and necessary functions, such as aiding in digestion. They also help protect the body from infiltration by pathogenic microbes. These beneficial microbial colonies compete with each other for space and resources. However, when this balance is disturbed, these colonies exhibit a decreased ability to check each other's growth, which can then lead to overgrowth of one or more of the disturbed colonies which may further damage some of the other smaller beneficial ones in a vicious cycle. As more beneficial colonies are damaged, making the imbalance more pronounced, more overgrowth issues occur because the damaged colonies are less able to check the growth of the overgrowing ones. If this goes unchecked long enough, a pervasive and chronic imbalance between colonies will set in, which ultimately minimizes the beneficial nature of these colonies as a whole.

== Potential causes of dysbiosis ==
Any disruption of the body's microbiota is able to lead to dysbiosis. Dysbiosis in the gut happens when the bacteria in the gastrointestinal tract become unbalanced. There are many causes for dysbiosis in the gut. Some reasons include, but are not limited to:

- Dietary changes
- Antibiotics that affect the gut flora
- Psychological and physical stress (weakens immune system)
- Use of radiation, chemotherapy, antiviral drugs, radioactive isotopes, and hormone therapy
- Presence of intestinal helminths (human parasites)
- Uncontrolled rectal cleansing with enemas
- Inflammatory process in the intestine
- Chronic and acute infections (HIV, Hepatitis C & B, herpes, etc.)

=== Gut/intestinal dysbiosis ===
Bacteria in the human gut's intestines are the most diverse in the human body and play a vital role in human health. In the gastrointestinal tract, dysbiosis manifests particularly during small intestinal bacterial overgrowth (SIBO), commonly caused by a decrease in the passage of food and waste through the gastrointestinal tract following surgery or other pre-existing conditions. SIBO is characterized by symptoms of abdominal pain, diarrhea, discomfort after eating, and malnutrition. Similarly, dysbiosis manifests during small intestinal fungal overgrowth (SIFO) caused by excessive population levels of fungi in a bowel. SIFO can be characterized by GI symptoms (vomiting, diarrhea) in those previously immunocompromised. The consumer's dietary habits can be one of the most influential factors on the gut's microbiota. Diets high in carbohydrates and refined sugars are common links to dysbiosis in the gut, whereas those rich in fruits, vegetables, and fish oils are considered more favorable to the gut due to their anti-inflammatory properties. Many diseases, such as IBD, Type 2 Diabetes, Crohn's, and even allergies, are suggested to be due, in part, to an alteration in the microbiome of the gut. Probiotics can sometimes cause mild gas and bloating in people who first start taking them, especially at high doses, as their body gets used to having new gut bacteria introduced into their gut.

=== Oral dysbiosis ===
The mouth is frequently exposed to novel microbes from the environment, and this can lead to microbial disturbances in the mouth as well as in the stomach and intestines. Hygiene and nutritional variation are imperative in preventing oral diseases such as gingivitis, tooth decay, and cavities, which are linked to altered microbial communities in the oral cavity. Oral pathogens can affect multiple microbiota compartments of the body and alter systemic processes, such as immunological alterations or digestion issues. Smoking, drinking, oral intercourse, and advanced age are all associated with oral dysbiosis.

=== Skin dysbiosis ===
There are a number of types of microorganisms that reside in and on the human skin, collectively known as the skin flora. Normal healthy microbial communities may have some positive effects. Altered microbial composition and diversity (dysbiosis), may play a role in some non-infectious skin conditions such as acne, atopic dermatitis, psoriasis, and rosacea. In more extreme cases, such as cellulitis, a pathogenic bacteria can infect the skin, the most common being Streptococci species and Staphylococcus aureus.

=== Vaginal dysbiosis ===
The vagina contains a microbiome (vaginal flora) that can become disturbed and result in conditions such as bacterial vaginosis. Alterations in vaginal flora can also affect vaginal health in reproduction, as well as one's risk of acquiring and the subsequent severity of sexually transmitted infections.

=== Role of antibiotics in promoting dysbiosis ===
Dysbiosis can occur during many stages of life and can be triggered by many different sources. Antibiotics, for example, are often a significant contributor to disruptions in microbiomes. This occurs because not all microbes will be affected by the antibiotic in the same way, and so it can change the balance of different types of microbes as well as changing the total number of microbes. Antibiotic usage during young childhood development can lead to adverse gut issues (dysbiosis) in adulthood. The gut microbiome is altered from antibiotics and is linked to future gut disease, i.e., IBD, ulcerative colitis, obesity, etc. The intestinal immune system is directly influenced by the gut microbiome and can be hard to recover if damaged through antibiotics. The use of minocycline in acne vulgaris has been associated with skin and gut dysbiosis. The use of antibiotics in agriculture, such as oxytetracycline and streptomycin can also lead to plant dysbiosis

== Effects ==
Gut dysbiosis has been linked to the pathogenesis of both intestinal and extra-intestinal disorders. Dysbiosis may affect intestinal disorders include IBD, IBS, and coeliac disease, as well as extra-intestinal conditions including allergies, asthma, metabolic syndrome, cardiovascular disease, and obesity.

Gut dysbiosis can also be a factor in neurodegenerative and cerebrovascular diseases due to the link between age-related dysbiosis and inflammation. Inflammation is a common factor for a wide variety of age-related pathologies, including neurological diseases. By correcting the dysbiosis in elderly patients, it may be possible to prevent the development of neurodegenerative diseases. Dysbiosis may contribute to the cause or development of neurological conditions, including autism, pain, depression, anxiety, and stroke. Dysbiosis contributing to neurological conditions is due to interactions with the gut-brain axis allowing the gut microbiome to influence neural development, cognition, and behavior. There has also been evidence that the gut microbiota composition can be altered due to changes in behavior, and changing the microbiome can also cause depressive-like behaviors.

Microbial colonies also excrete many different types of waste byproducts. Using different waste removal mechanisms, under normal circumstances the body effectively manages these byproducts with little or no trouble. Unfortunately, oversized and inappropriately large colonies, due to their increased numbers, excrete increased amounts of these byproducts. As the amount of microbial byproducts increases, the higher waste byproducts levels can overburden the body's waste removal mechanisms.

A human's microbiome can change because of inflammatory processes, such as cell-mediated inflammation and host-mediated inflammation, or a 'driver' bacteria causing/aggravating inflammation. This change allows the microbial community to become more susceptible to pathogens. Once the pathogens are established successfully, they contribute to dysbiosis and produce genotoxins and other potential cancer-causing microbial metabolites. The evolution of pathogens is another possible effect of dysbiosis, contributing to a potential increase in cancer risk.

The density of bacteria in the colon is high (about 10^{12} per ml.), and these bacteria are subject to dysbiosis. By contrast, the small intestine has a relatively low density of bacteria (about 10^{2} per ml.) so that dysbiosis is likely less of a problem. This difference may account for the greater than 10-fold higher incidence of cancer in the colon compared to the small intestine. The risk of intestinal cancer is associated with a Western high fat diet that increases susceptibility to secondary bile acid induced dysbiosis. Exposure of the colon to an increased level of secondary bile acids resulting from dysbiosis can cause DNA damage, and such damage can cause carcinogenic mutations in colon cells.

Gut dysbiosis can affect the cardiovascular system "via signaling molecules and bioactive metabolites. This could cause diseases through neuro-entero-endocrine hormones that can lead to heart failure and other conditions such as chronic kidney disease, hypertension, obesity, and diabetes.

== Associated illnesses ==
Cross-regulation occurs between the host and the gut microbiota in healthy people, resulting in a homeostatic equilibrium of bacteria that keeps the gastrointestinal tract healthy and free of potentially pathogenic bacteria. There are three significant categories of dysbiosis: loss of beneficial organisms, excessive growth of potentially harmful microorganisms, and loss of overall microbial diversity. Disruptions in the microbiome can allow outside factors or even pathogenic members of the microbiome to take hold in the gut environment. Dysbiosis has been reported to be associated with illnesses, such as multiple chemical sensitivity, periodontal disease, inflammatory bowel disease, chronic fatigue syndrome, obesity, cancer, bacterial vaginosis, and colitis.

=== Inflammatory bowel disease ===
There is no single or well-understood microbial cause of Crohn's disease, but three major pathogens have been associated with Crohn's disease: Mycobacterium avium paratuberculosis (MAP), adherent-invasive Escherichia coli (AIEC), and Clostridioides difficile. The causal role, if any, these bacteria play has yet to be determined. Rather than the "one-microbe-one disease" hypothesis, some think that Crohn's is caused by an imbalance of commensal microflora associated with more complex interactions between the host and the entire intestinal microbiota.

=== Obesity ===
Obesity is a metabolic condition in which the body retains an unhealthy amount of fat. Similar to IBD, a specific microbiota appears to be linked to the development of obesity. There is a notable reduction in microbial diversity in obese individuals. Research in humans and animals shows an association of obesity with altered ratios between Bacteroidetes and Firmicutes; as Bacteriodetes decreases, Firmicutes increases. This ratio has been linked to body weight and fat accumulation, indicating that obese people have a higher disproportionate ratio of these bacteria.

=== Diabetes mellitus ===
Diabetes mellitus (DM) is a carbohydrate metabolism disorder characterized by insufficient insulin output or utilization, which is needed for the body to turn sugars and starches into energy. The prevalence of DM in the United States is about 29.1 million, with about 1.7 million new diagnoses annually. The two forms of diabetes are Type 1 and Type 2. Type 1 DM is also known as insulin-dependent diabetes mellitus (IDDM). Type 1 diabetes is an autoimmune condition that affects the beta cells in the pancreas, causing insulin production to be impaired. It is most often diagnosed in children and young adults. Type 2 diabetes mellitus, also known as non-insulin-dependent diabetes mellitus (NIDDM), is a type of diabetes that affects adults and is characterized by insulin resistance, which occurs when tissue sensitivity insulin is reduced, causing the body to ignore the insulin released. Research has shown dysbiosis of the intestinal microbiota may contribute to both forms of diabetes. Dysbiosis related to type 1 DM is characterized by a decline in mucin-degrading bacteria, such as Bifidobacteria, Lactobacillus, and Prevotella, and an increase in Bacteroidetes and Clostridium.

=== Cancer ===
Sustained periods of dysbiosis lead to extended amounts of stress and inflammation in the gut microbiome, which can in turn promote the production of carcinogenic metabolites. Intestinal dysbiosis has been associated with colorectal cancer (CRC). According to the American Cancer Society, colorectal cancer is the third most common cancer and the second leading cause of cancer death in the United States. In CRC patients, a general dysbiosis pattern has been discovered, including a decrease in butyrate-producing bacteria and an increase in the proportion of several potentially pathogenic bacteria.

=== Clostridioides difficile ===
C. difficile is an opportunistic bacteria that commonly infects patients following a disruption in the microbiome, such as treatment with antibiotics. Infection can lead to several different symptoms including watery diarrhea, fever, loss of appetite, nausea, and abdominal pain. Severe or chronic infections of C. difficile can lead to inflammation of the colon, a condition known as colitis.

=== Periodontitis ===
Periodontitis is an oral infection that can damage the bones supporting teeth and lead to tooth loss. One of the major risk factors for periodontitis is the disruption of the oral microbiome such that there is an accumulation of pathogenic bacteria. Studies show that the oral microbiota changes as periodontitis progress, shifting from gram-positive aerobes to gram-negative anaerobes. Oral dysbiosis is likely to evolve, shifting the symbiotic host-microbe relationship to a pathogenic one. During this time, the host's oral health deteriorates, eventually leading to clinical disease.

=== Acne vulgaris ===
The use of minocycline in acne vulgaris has been associated with skin and gut dysbiosis.

=== Cardiovascular disease ===
Dysbiosis of intestinal microbiota may accelerate the progression of cardiovascular disease. Dietary habits, high stress, intestinal infections and use of antibiotics can cause an imbalance in the species and quantity of microorganisms in the adult intestine. Gut dysbiosis may lead to inflammation and metabolic disorders that promote the development of cardiovascular disease.

== Treatments ==
=== Antibiotics ===
Because of the complex interactions in the microbiome, not much data exists on the efficacy of using antibiotics to treat dysbiosis. However, the broad-spectrum antibiotic rifaximin has been shown to have a favorable response in several of the ailments associated with dysbiosis, including irritable bowel syndrome.

While most antibiotics alter the gut microbiota for the duration of the treatment, some cause long-lasting changes. However, repeated exposure to antibiotics can also cause the opposite of the intended effect and destabilize the gut microbiome, resulting in promoting "outgrowth of antibiotic-resistant pathogenic bacteria" (see antibiotic misuse) thus aggravating gut dysbiosis.

=== Fecal microbiota transplant (FMT) ===
Fecal microbiota transplantation (FMT) is an experimental treatment that has resolved 80–90 percent of dysbiosis-related infections caused by recurrent C. difficile infections that do not respond to antibiotics in randomized, controlled clinical trials. A patient's colon is transplanted during FMT with a fecal preparation from a carefully screened, healthy stool donor. FMT is thought to work by repopulating the patient's microbiome with various microorganisms that compete with C. difficile for space.

FMTs use the same line of reasoning as probiotics; to recreate a healthy balance of microbiota in the microbiome by inserting beneficial microbes into the environment. FMT accomplishes this by taking a donation of fecal matter from a healthy individual, diluted, strained and introduced to a diseased patient. FMTs are currently used to treat patients with Clostridioides difficile infections, who have proved resistant to other therapies. However, this is considered an investigational therapy at present with risks that have not been fully defined. FMT is also being investigated for use in psychiatric disorders. Because the process is not sterile and contaminations can pass from donor to patient, there is a push to isolate key microbiota and culture them independently.

=== Probiotics ===
The World Health Organization defines probiotics as "live microorganisms, which when administered in adequate amounts, confer a health benefit on the host". The benefit of using probiotics to treat dysbiosis related diseases lies in its ability to treat the underlying cause of said diseases. Some benefits include their ability to suppress inflammation in the microbiome and disrupt colonization by pathogens.

Excessive use of antibiotics, IBD, obesity, diabetes, cardiovascular disease, and many more ailments are related to interruptions in the microbiome(dysbiosis), especially in the human gut. Probiotics can promote healthier microbial function by introducing or reintroducing helpful bacteria to strengthen the weaknesses presented in a dysbiotic microbiome. It is essential to recognize that such circumstances are beneficial bacteria that occur more frequently than harmful ones. Probiotics can be utilized in aiding existing conditions and preventing such diseases by instituting anti-inflammatory properties and improving immune cell function.

The human gut contains a wide diversity of bacteria and can easily be disrupted through diet, medicinal usage, diseases, and many others. Probiotics have proven influential in returning the intestinal microbiota to homeostatic balance and improve intestinal health.

Probiotics contain anti-inflammatory properties that assist in the prevention and treatment of intestinal diseases due to microbial dysbiosis. More research is needed to understand better the many benefits probiotics can offer for multiple forms of dysbiosis. Lactobacillus is the most researched genus of probiotic bacteria. It is sold to consumers for gut health either as a single strain or part of a multi-strain formulation.

== See also ==
- Human microbiome
- List of bacterial vaginosis microbiota

== In aging ==
That 2023 revision of the hallmarks list also gave an unbalanced community of gut microbes, under the name dysbiosis, a place of its own.
