= Muge (surname) =

Muge is a surname. Notable people with the surname include:

- Alexander Muge (1948–1990), Kenyan Anglican bishop
- Amélia Muge (born 1952), Mozambique-born Portuguese singer, instrumentalist, composer, and lyricist
- Some Muge (1959–1997), Kenyan long-distance runner

== See also ==
- Müge, a given name
