= European Journal of Clinical Microbiology & Infectious Diseases =

- Discipline: Clinical microbiology and Infectious diseases
- Language: English
- Edited by: Laurent Poirel

Publication details
- Former name: European Journal of Clinical Microbiology
- History: 1982–present
- Publisher: Springer Science+Business Media
- Frequency: Monthly
- Open access: Hybrid
- Impact factor: 3.2 (2025)

Standard abbreviations
- ISO 4: Eur. J. Clin. Microbiol. Infect. Dis.

Indexing
- CODEN: EJCDEU
- ISSN: 0934-9723 (print); 1435-4373 (web)
- OCLC no.: 17800606

Links
- Journal homepage; Online access and archive

The European Journal of Clinical Microbiology & Infectious Diseases is a monthly peer-reviewed medical journal covering clinical microbiology and infectious diseases. It was established in 1982 as the European Journal of Clinical Microbiology obtaining its current title in 1987. The founding editor was Ilja Braveny. The editor-in-chief is Laurent Poirel. It is published by Springer Science+Business Media.

== Abstracting and indexing ==
The journal is abstracted and indexed in:

- Academic OneFile
- Academic Search
- CAB Abstracts
- Chemical Abstracts
- Current Contents/Life Sciences
- Elsevier BIOBASE
- Embase
- Global Health
- Index Medicus/MEDLINE/PubMed
- International Bibliography of Periodical Literature
- Science Citation Index Expanded (SCIE)
- Scopus
- Tropical Diseases Bulletin

According to the Journal Citation Reports, the journal has a 2025 impact factor of 3.2, ranking it 55th out of 141 journals in the category "Infectious Diseases" and 92th out of 167 journals in the category "Microbiology".
