= Suzan Çevik =

Turkish Paralympic sport shooter

Personal information
- Nationality: Turkish
- Born: Suzan Tekin; 23 October 1977 (age 48) Diyarbakır, Turkey
- Years active: 2005-

Sport
- Country: Turkey
- Sport: Paralympic rifle shooting
- Event(s): R2 10m air rifle standing SH1; R3 10m air rifle prone SH1
- Coached by: Hakan Çevik; Tolga Korkusuz (national team)
Medal record
Paralympic pistol shooting
Representing Turkey
IPC Shooting World Cup
| Bronze medal – third place | 2014 Szczecin | R2 SH1 Women's |
- Updated on 10 September 2016

Suzan Çevik (born Suzan Tekin; 23 October 1977) is a Turkish female paralympic shooter competing in the rifle events. She took part at the 2008 Summer Paralympics in Beijing, China and 2016 Summer Paralympics in Rio de Janeiro, Brazil.

== Early life ==
She was born as Suzan Tekin in Diyarbakır, Turkey on 23 October 1977. After marriage with Hakan Çevik, she took her spouse's surname.

== Sporting career ==
Çevik began her shooting career in 2005. She trains with her spouse Hakan Çevik, who is also a para-shooter. In the national team, she is coached by Tolga Korkusuz.

She competes in the R2 women's 10m air rifle standing SH1 and R3 women's 10m air rifle prone SH1. The SH1 sport class is designated for shooters with a lesser impairment of arms so that they do not require support of the firearm.

Çevik debuted internationally in 2006 at the IPC Shooting World Championships in Sargans, Switzerland. She took part at the same championship in 2010, 2013, and 2014.

She participated at the 2013 IPC World Shooting Cup competing in Szczecin, Poland. Cevik won the bronze at the same event in Poland the next year. She took part at the 2015 IPC World Shooting Cup events in Antalya, Turkey, Fort Benning, United States, and Sydney, Australia.

Çevik competed at the 2008 Paralympics, and 2016 Paralympics.
