= Hakan Çevik =

Turkish Paralympic shooter

Hakan Çevik (born 1 May 1976) is a Turkish male paralympic shooter competing in the rifle events. He took part at the 2016 Summer Paralympics.

== Early life ==
Hakan Çevik was born on 1 May 1976. His spouse Suzan Çevik also is a Paralympic shooter competing in the R2 women's 10m air rifle standing SH1 and R3 women's 10m air rifle prone SH1 events. Hakan Çevik serves as the trainer of her spouse.

== Sporting career ==
Çevik competes in the R4 mixed team 10m air rifle standing SH2 and R5 mixed team 10m air rifle prone SH2 events. SH2 is the sport class designated specially for rifle shooters with a more severe impairment in the upper limbs so that they need to use a shooting stand.

He obtained a quota spot for the 2016 Summer Paralympics in Rio de Janeiro, Brazil after his participation at the 2015 IPC Shooting World Cup in Fort Benning, United States.
