= Policy Issues =

Policy Issues is a series of online peer-reviewed articles published by the Agricultural & Applied Economics Association (AAEA). Each article presents a short analysis and discussion focusing on timely policy issues targeted for those in public and private sector decision-making roles that have a stake in the national issues addressed. It is currently one of three outreach products offered by AAEA, along with the online policy magazine Choices and the forthcoming Shared Materials section of the AAEA Web site.

== Format ==
Each issue of Policy Issues focuses on a timely issue in agricultural policy. The purpose is to provide expert analysis quickly, on a topic that is still relevant to those in the public and private sector. Articles are published one at a time, and are usually published monthly.

== Editors ==
The current Editor of Policy Issues is Walt Armbruster, Farm Foundation, President Emeritus. The Technical Editor is Patricia Keough-Wilson, Plains Harvest Communications.
