= International Severe Acute Respiratory and emerging Infection Consortium =

International medical research initiative

- Abbreviation: ISARIC
- Formation: 2011; 15 years ago
- Location: United Kingdom
- Executive Director: Peter Horby
- Website: https://isaric.org/

The International Severe Acute Respiratory and emerging Infection Consortium (ISARIC) is an international research initiative based in Oxford, England. It is hosted at the Nuffield Department of Medicine within the University of Oxford and led by the Epidemic diseases Research Group Oxford (ERGO). ISARIC is funded by the Bill & Melinda Gates Foundation, the Foreign, Commonwealth and Development Office, and Wellcome Trust.

== History ==
ISARIC was founded in 2011. In 2012, ISARIC joined with the World Health Organization to launch the Clinical Characterisation Protocol (CCP) program. Its founders cited the 2002–2004 SARS outbreak, 2009 swine flu outbreak and later 2012 MERS outbreak as inciting incidents for the creation of an open source platform for sharing clinical research on emerging infectious diseases.

ISARIC launched a Career Development Professional Scheme funded by the Bill & Melinda Gates Foundation in 2019. In February 2019, ISARIC received £4.5 million in funding from the Gates Foundation, Wellcome Trust, and the Department for International Development to "accelerate clinical research to prevent illness and deaths from epidemic infectious diseases."

=== COVID-19 ===
ISARIC participated in launching standardized data collection programs worldwide in response to the COVID-19 pandemic, including its COVID-19 Clinical Characterisation Protocol (CCP) in January 2020. The first COVID-19 patient record was uploaded to the CCP database on February 13, 2020, growing to over 10,000 reports within a month. Through its CCP collaboration with the World Health Organization, ISARIC has analyzed patient data in the United Kingdom to understand the clinical presentation and outcomes of COVID-19 patients.

== Activities ==
=== Comprehensive Clinical Characterisation Collaboration ===
ISARIC leads the Comprehensive Clinical Characterisation Collaboration (ISARIC4C), a United Kingdom-wide collaborative study funded by UK Research and Innovation and the National Institute for Health Research.

== Organization ==
=== Members ===
ISARIC's membership includes:

- African coaLition for Epidemic Research Response and Training (ALERRT)
- ANRS Emerging Infectious Diseases
- Australian and New Zealand Intensive Care Research Centre (ANZIC-RC)
- Australian and New Zealand Intensive Care Society (ANZICS)
- Australian Partnership for Preparedness Research on Infectious Disease Emergencies (APPRISE)
- Brazilian Research in Intensive Care Network (BRICNet)
- CAP-China
- Clinical and Applied Research Network of Chikungunya
- Clinical Research/Innovation in Pneumonia & Sepsis (CRIPS)
- Clinical Research, Investigation, and Systems Modeling of Acute Illness (CRISMA) Center
- Colombian Collaborative Network on Zika (RECOLZIKA)
- COVID-19 Multi-Phenotyping for Effective Therapies (COMET)
- Critical Care Research Group (CCRG)
- Department of Internal Medicine No. 2
- Discovery Critical Care Research Network Program for Resilience and Emergency Preparedness (Discovery PREP)
- Emergency Medicine Network (EMNet)
- Epicentre
- European Clinical Research Alliance on Infectious Diseases (ECRAID)
- GABRIEL Network
- GenOMICC
- George Institute for Global Health
- Indian Registry of IntenSive Care (IRIS ICU Registry)
- Institut Pasteur de Madagascar
- Intensive Care National Audit & Research Centre (ICNARC)
- International Forum for Acute Care Trialists (InFACT)
- International Network for Strategic Initiatives in Global HIV Trials (INSIGHT)
- Investigación en Infecciones, Inmunología e Innovacion en Pediatria (I4P)
- Irish Critical Care Clinical Trials Network
- ISARIC Comprehensive Clinical Characterisation Collaboration (ISARIC4C)
- KEMRI Wellcome Trust Research Programme
- Latin America Intensive Care Network (LIVEN)
- Latin American Network of Coronavirus Disease 2019 Research (LANCOVID-19)
- Mahidol Oxford Topical Medicine Research Unit (MORA)
- Mexican Emerging Infectious Disease Clinical Research Network (LaRed)
- MRC-University of Glasgow Centre for Virus Research Network (CVR-CRN)
- Network for Improving Critical Care Systems and Training (NICST)
- Oxford University Clinical Research Unit-Nepal (OUCRU-NP)
- Oxford University Clinical Research Unit-Vietnam (OUCRU-Vietnam)
- Pan-Africa Consortium for the Evaluation of Antituberculosis Antibiotics (PanACEA)
- Pan African Bioinformatics Network for H3Africa (H3ABioNET)
- Pan-African Network for Rapid Research, Response and Preparedness for Infectious Diseases Epidemics (PANDORA-ID-Net)
- Partnering for Enhanced Digital Surveillance of Influenza-like Disease and the Effect of Antivirals & Vaccines (PEDSIDEA)
- Pasteur International Network Association (PINA)
- Pediatric Intensive Care Influenza Network (PICFLU)
- Peking University People's Hospital - The Network Platform of Severe Acute Respiratory Infectious diseases (SARI) in China
- Saudi Critical Care Trials Group (SCCTG)
- Sechenov University Hospital Network
- South East Asian Research & Education in Critical-Care Health (SEARCH)
- University Hospital Würzburg
- Zika Preparedness Latin American Network (ZikaPLAN)
- ZIKAction
- ZIKAlliance
