= Medical microbiology =

Branch of medical science

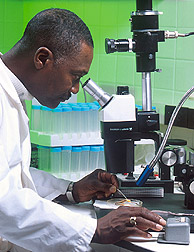
A microbiologist examining cultures under a dissecting microscope

Medical microbiology, the large subset of microbiology that is applied to medicine, is a branch of medical science concerned with the prevention, diagnosis and treatment of infectious diseases. In addition, this field of science studies various clinical applications of microbes for the improvement of health. There are four kinds of microorganisms that cause infectious disease: bacteria, fungi, parasites and viruses, and one type of infectious protein called prion.

A medical microbiologist studies the characteristics of pathogens, their modes of transmission, mechanisms of infection and growth. The academic qualification as a clinical/Medical Microbiologist in a hospital or medical research centre generally requires a Bachelors degree while in some countries a Masters in Microbiology along with Ph.D. in any of the life-sciences (Biochem, Micro, Biotech, Genetics, etc.). Medical microbiologists often serve as consultants for physicians, providing identification of pathogens and suggesting treatment options. Using this information, a treatment can be devised. Other tasks may include the identification of potential health risks to the community or monitoring the evolution of potentially virulent or resistant strains of microbes, educating the community and assisting in the design of health practices. They may also assist in preventing or controlling epidemics and outbreaks of disease. Not all medical microbiologists study microbial pathology; some study common, non-pathogenic species to determine whether their properties can be used to develop antibiotics or other treatment methods.

Epidemiology, the study of the patterns, causes, and effects of health and disease conditions in populations, is an important part of medical microbiology, although the clinical aspect of the field primarily focuses on the presence and growth of microbial infections in individuals, their effects on the human body, and the methods of treating those infections. In this respect the entire field, as an applied science, can be conceptually subdivided into academic and clinical sub-specialties, although in reality there is a fluid continuum between public health microbiology and clinical microbiology, just as the state of the art in clinical laboratories depends on continual improvements in academic medicine and research laboratories.

== History ==
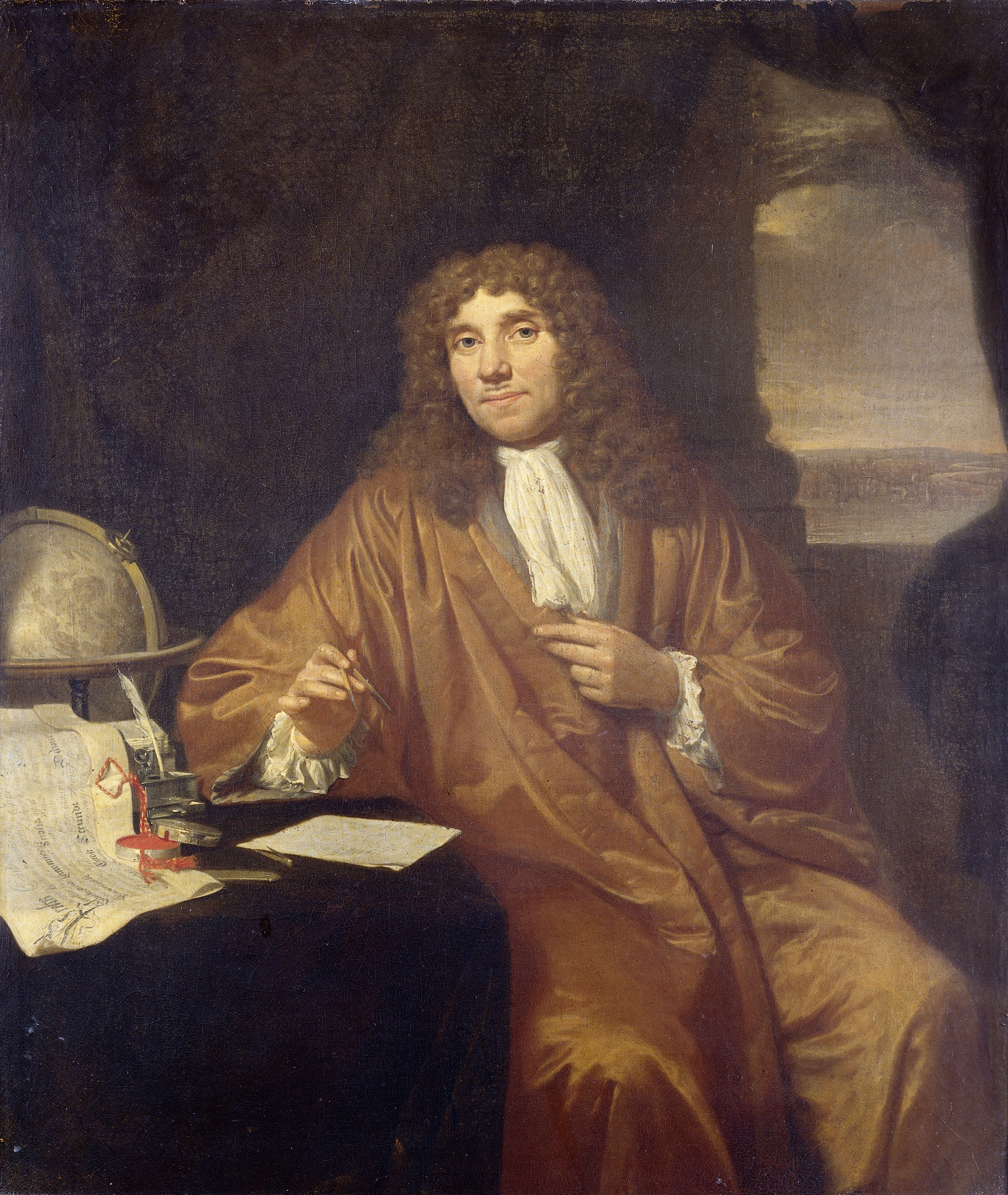
Anton van Leeuwenhoek was the first to observe microorganisms using a microscope.

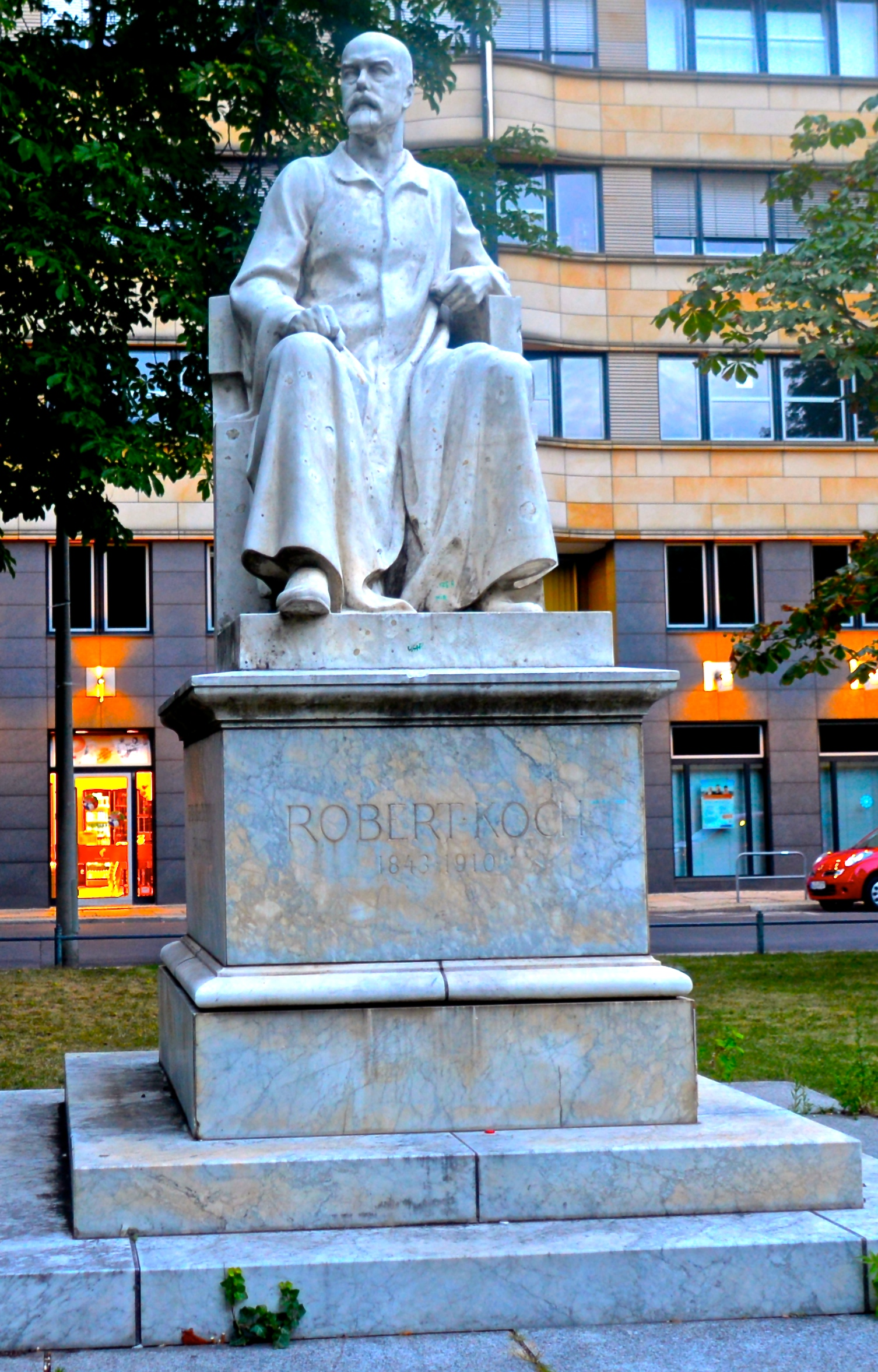
Statue of Robert Koch, "father of medical bacteriology", at Robert-Koch-Platz (Robert Koch square) in Berlin

In 1676, Anton van Leeuwenhoek observed bacteria and other microorganisms, using a single-lens microscope of his own design.

In 1796, Edward Jenner developed a method using cowpox to successfully immunize a child against smallpox. The same principles are used for developing vaccines today.

Following on from this, in 1857 Louis Pasteur also designed vaccines against several diseases such as anthrax, fowl cholera and rabies as well as pasteurization for food preservation.

In 1867 Joseph Lister is considered to be the father of antiseptic surgery. By sterilizing the instruments with diluted carbolic acid and using it to clean wounds, post-operative infections were reduced, making surgery safer for patients.

In the years between 1876 and 1884 Robert Koch provided much insight into infectious diseases. He was one of the first scientists to focus on the isolation of bacteria in pure culture. This gave rise to the germ theory, a certain microorganism being responsible for a certain disease. He developed a series of criteria around this that have become known as the Koch's postulates.

A major milestone in medical microbiology is the Gram stain. In 1884 Hans Christian Gram developed the method of staining bacteria to make them more visible and differentiated under a microscope. This technique is widely used today.

In 1910 Paul Ehrlich tested multiple combinations of arsenic based chemicals on infected rabbits with syphilis. Ehrlich then found that arsphenamine was found effective against syphilis spirochetes. The arsphenamines was then made available in 1910, known as Salvarsan.

In 1929 Alexander Fleming developed one of the most commonly used antibiotic substances both at the time and now: penicillin.

In 1939 Gerhard Domagk found Prontosil red protected mice from pathogenic streptococci and staphylococci without toxicity. Domagk received the Nobel Prize in physiology, or medicine, for the discovery of the sulfa drug.

DNA sequencing, a method developed by Walter Gilbert and Frederick Sanger in 1977, caused a rapid change the development of vaccines, medical treatments and diagnostic methods. Some of these include synthetic insulin which was produced in 1979 using recombinant DNA and the first genetically engineered vaccine was created in 1986 for hepatitis B.

In 1995 a team at The Institute for Genomic Research sequenced the first bacterial genome; Haemophilus influenzae. A few months later, the first eukaryotic genome was completed. This would prove invaluable for diagnostic techniques.

In 2007, a team at the Danish food company Danisco, were able to identify the purpose of the CRIPR-Cas systems as adaptive immunity to phages. The system was then quickly found to be able to help in genome editing through its ability to generate double strand breaks. A patient with sickle cell disease was the first person to be treated for a genetic disorder with CRISPR in July 2019.

== Commonly treated infectious diseases ==
Bacterial

- Streptococcal pharyngitis
- Chlamydia
- Typhoid fever
- Tuberculosis

Viral

- Rotavirus
- Hepatitis C
- Human papillomavirus (HPV)

Parasitic

- Malaria
- Giardia lamblia
- Toxoplasma gondii

Fungal

- Candida
- Histoplasmosis
- Dandruff

Prion - Misfolded proteins that usually occur in the brain and trigger other normal proteins to misfold. They are extremely rare, and these built-up proteins lead to complications.

- Transmissible spongiform encephalopathies (TSE)
- Creutzfeldt-Jakob disease (CJD)
- Fatal familial insomnia

== Causes and transmission of infectious diseases ==
Infections may be caused by bacteria, viruses, fungi, prions, and parasites. The pathogen that causes the disease may be exogenous (acquired from an external source; environmental, animal or other people, e.g. Influenza) or endogenous (from normal flora e.g. Candidiasis).

The site at which a microbe enters the body is referred to as the portal of entry. These include the respiratory tract, gastrointestinal tract, genitourinary tract, skin, parenteral, blood transfusion, congenital, optic, and mucous membranes. The portal of entry for a specific microbe is normally dependent on how it travels from its natural habitat to the host.

There are various ways in which disease can be transmitted between individuals. These include:

- Direct contact - Touching an infected host, including sexual contact
- Indirect contact - Touching a contaminated surface
- Droplet contact - Coughing or sneezing
- Fecal–oral route - Ingesting contaminated food or water sources
- Airborne transmission - Pathogen carrying spores
- Vector transmission - An organism that does not cause disease itself but transmits infection by conveying pathogens from one host to another
- Fomite transmission - An inanimate object or substance capable of carrying infectious germs or parasites
- Environmental - Hospital-acquired infection (Nosocomial infections)

Like other pathogens, viruses use these methods of transmission to enter the body, but viruses differ in that they must also enter into the host's actual cells. Once the virus has gained access to the host's cells, the virus' genetic material (RNA or DNA) must be introduced to the cell. Replication between viruses is greatly varied and depends on the type of genes involved in them. Most DNA viruses assemble in the nucleus while most RNA viruses develop solely in cytoplasm.

The mechanisms for infection, proliferation, and persistence of a virus in cells of the host are crucial for its survival. For example, some diseases such as measles employ a strategy whereby it must spread to a series of hosts. In these forms of viral infection, the illness is often treated by the body's own immune response, and therefore the virus is required to disperse to new hosts before it is destroyed by immunological resistance or host death. In contrast, some infectious agents such as the Feline leukemia virus, are able to withstand immune responses and are capable of achieving long-term residence within an individual host, whilst also retaining the ability to spread into successive hosts.

Virulence refers to the ability of an organism to invade a host and cause disease. Virulence factors are molecules that enable bacteria to attach to and invade the host's cells. These factors can be secreted, featured on the membrane, or located inside the cell (cytosolic). Cytosolic factors help bacteria rapidly adapt their metabolic, physical, and structural characteristics. Membrane-bound factors help bacteria adhere to the host and avoid detection by the host's immune system. Secreted factors assist bacteria to overcome the body's innate and adaptive immune defenses. In extracellular threats, secreted factors work together to destroy host cells.

== Diagnostic tests ==
Identification of an infectious agent for a minor illness can be as simple as clinical presentation; such as gastrointestinal disease and skin infections. In order to make an educated estimate as to which microbe could be causing the disease, epidemiological factors need to be considered; such as the patient's likelihood of exposure to the suspected organism and the presence and prevalence of a microbial strain in a community.

Diagnosis of infectious disease is nearly always initiated by consulting the patient's medical history and conducting a physical examination. More detailed identification techniques involve microbial culture, microscopy, biochemical tests and genotyping. Other less common techniques (such as X-rays, CAT scans, PET scans or NMR) are used to produce images of internal abnormalities resulting from the growth of an infectious agent.

=== Microbial culture ===
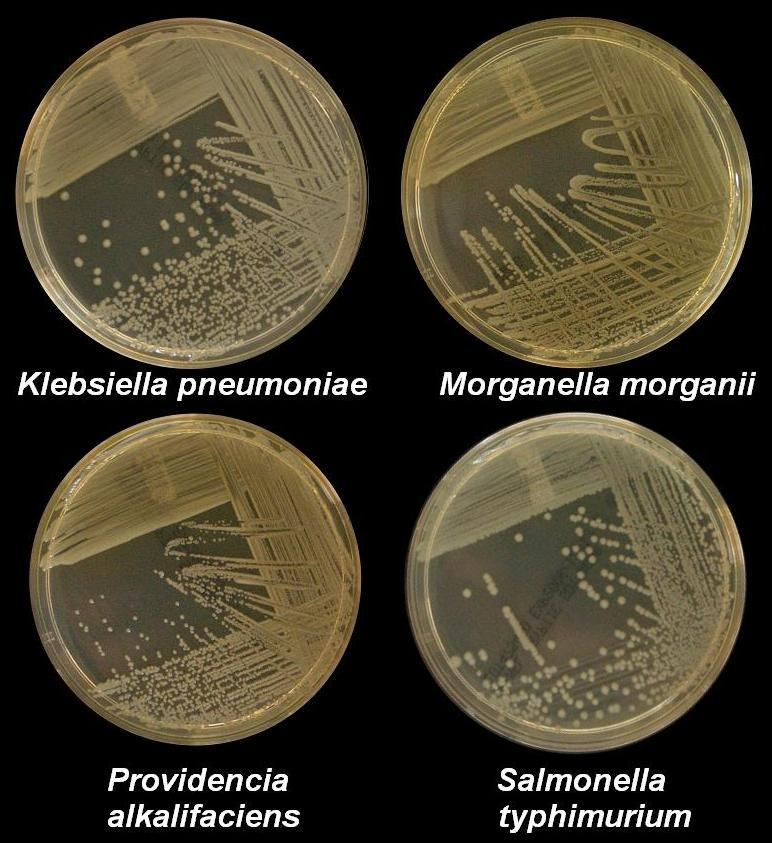
Four nutrient agar plates growing colonies of common Gram negative bacteria

Microbiological culture is the primary method used for isolating infectious disease for study in the laboratory. Tissue or fluid samples are tested for the presence of a specific pathogen, which is determined by growth in a selective or differential medium.

The 3 main types of media used for testing are:

- Solid culture: A solid surface is created using a mixture of nutrients, salts and agar. A single microbe on an agar plate can then grow into colonies (clones where cells are identical to each other) containing thousands of cells. These are primarily used to culture bacteria and fungi.
- Liquid culture: Cells are grown inside a liquid media. Microbial growth is determined by the time taken for the liquid to form a colloidal suspension. This technique is used for diagnosing parasites and detecting mycobacteria.
- Cell culture: Human or animal cell cultures are infected with the microbe of interest. These cultures are then observed to determine the effect the microbe has on the cells. This technique is used for identifying viruses.

=== Microscopy ===
Culture techniques will often use a microscopic examination to help in the identification of the microbe. Instruments such as compound light microscopes can be used to assess critical aspects of the organism. This can be performed immediately after the sample is taken from the patient and is used in conjunction with biochemical staining techniques, allowing for resolution of cellular features. Electron microscopes and fluorescence microscopes are also used for observing microbes in greater detail for research. The two main types of electron microscopy are scanning electron microscopy and transmission electron microscopy. Transmission electron microscopy passes electrons through a thin cross-section of the cell of interest, and it then redirects the electrons onto a fluorescent screen. This method is useful for looking at the inside of cells, and the structures within, especially cell walls and membranes. Scanning electron microscopy reads the electrons that are reflected off the surface of the cells. A 3-dimensional image is then made which shows the size and exterior structure of the cells. Both techniques help give more detailed information about the structure of microbes. This makes it useful in many medical fields, such as diagnostics and biopsies of many body parts, hygiene, and virology. They provide critical information about the structure of pathogens, which allow physicians to treat them with more knowledge.

=== Biochemical tests ===
Fast and relatively simple biochemical tests can be used to identify infectious agents. For bacterial identification, the use of metabolic or enzymatic characteristics are common due to their ability to ferment carbohydrates in patterns characteristic of their genus and species. Acids, alcohols and gases are usually detected in these tests when bacteria are grown in selective liquid or solid media, as mentioned above. In order to perform these tests en masse, automated machines are used. These machines perform multiple biochemical tests simultaneously, using cards with several wells containing different dehydrated chemicals. The microbe of interest will react with each chemical in a specific way, aiding in its identification.

Serological methods are highly sensitive, specific and often extremely rapid laboratory tests used to identify different types of microorganisms. The tests are based upon the ability of an antibody to bind specifically to an antigen. The antigen (usually a protein or carbohydrate made by an infectious agent) is bound by the antibody, allowing this type of test to be used for organisms other than bacteria. This binding then sets off a chain of events that can be easily and definitively observed, depending on the test. More complex serological techniques are known as immunoassays. Using a similar basis as described above, immunoassays can detect or measure antigens from either infectious agents or the proteins generated by an infected host in response to the infection.

=== Polymerase chain reaction ===
Polymerase chain reaction (PCR) assays are the most commonly used molecular technique to detect and study microbes. As compared to other methods, sequencing and analysis is definitive, reliable, accurate, and fast. Today, quantitative PCR is the primary technique used, as this method provides faster data compared to a standard PCR assay. For instance, traditional PCR techniques require the use of gel electrophoresis to visualize amplified DNA molecules after the reaction has finished. quantitative PCR does not require this, as the detection system uses fluorescence and probes to detect the DNA molecules as they are being amplified. In addition to this, quantitative PCR also removes the risk of contamination that can occur during standard PCR procedures (carrying over PCR product into subsequent PCRs). Another advantage of using PCR to detect and study microbes is that the DNA sequences of newly discovered infectious microbes or strains can be compared to those already listed in databases, which in turn helps to increase understanding of which organism is causing the infectious disease and thus what possible methods of treatment could be used. This technique is the current standard for detecting viral infections such as AIDS and hepatitis.

== Treatments ==
Once an infection has been diagnosed and identified, suitable treatment options must be assessed by the physician and consulting medical microbiologists. Some infections can be dealt with by the body's own immune system, but more serious infections are treated with antimicrobial drugs. Bacterial infections are treated with antibacterials (often called antibiotics) whereas fungal and viral infections are treated with antifungals and antivirals respectively. A broad class of drugs known as antiparasitics are used to treat parasitic diseases.

Medical microbiologists often make treatment recommendations to the patient's physician based on the strain of microbe and its antibiotic resistances, the site of infection, the potential toxicity of antimicrobial drugs and any drug allergies the patient has.

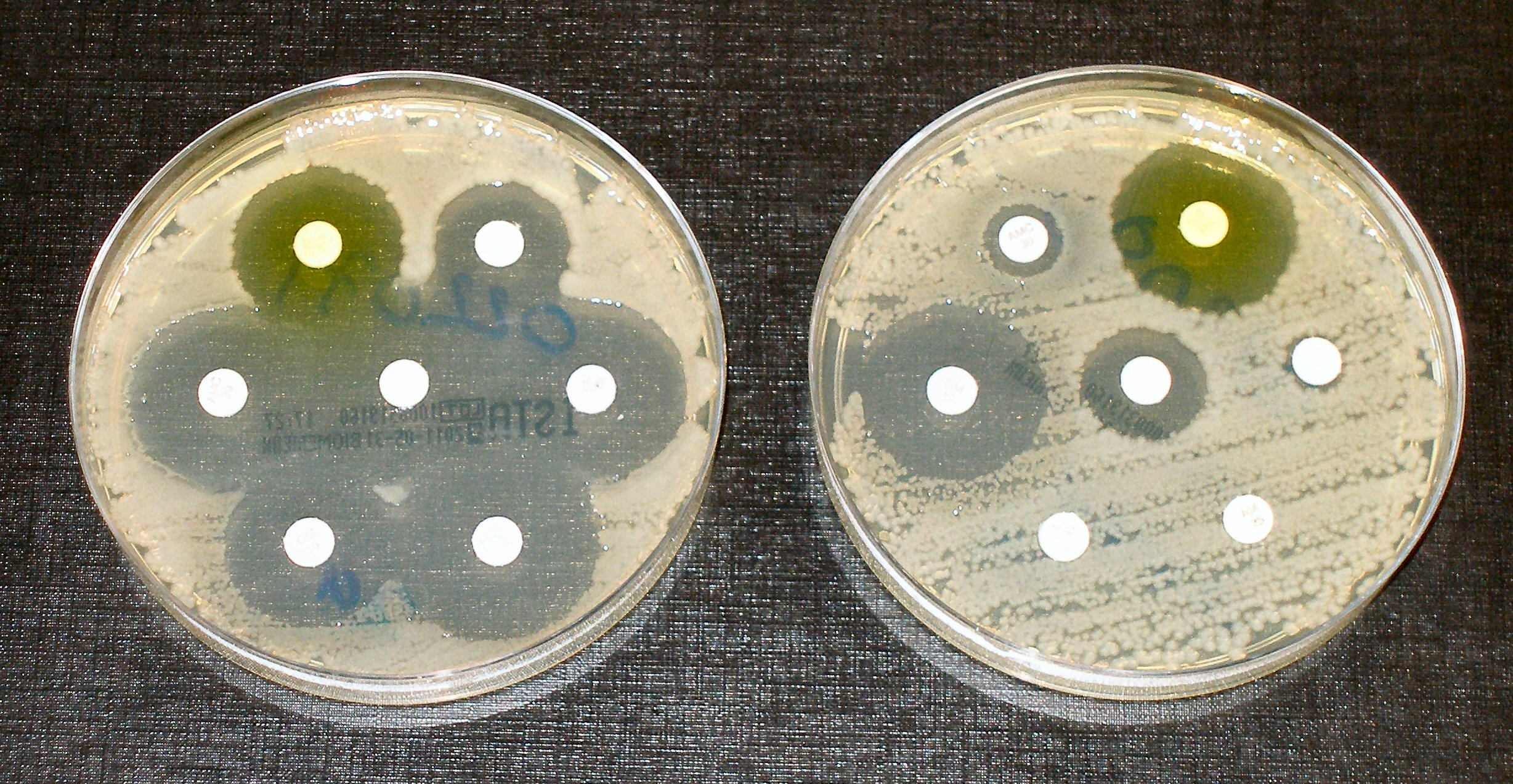
Antibiotic resistance tests: bacteria in the culture on the left are sensitive to the antibiotics contained in the white, paper discs. Bacteria in the culture on the right are resistant to most of the antibiotics.

In addition to drugs being specific to a certain kind of organism (bacteria, fungi, etc.), some drugs are specific to a certain genus or species of organism, and will not work on other organisms. Because of this specificity, medical microbiologists must consider the effectiveness of certain antimicrobial drugs when making recommendations. Additionally, strains of an organism may be resistant to a certain drug or class of drug, even when it is typically effective against the species. These strains, termed resistant strains, present a serious public health concern of growing importance to the medical industry as the spread of antibiotic resistance worsens. Antimicrobial resistance is an increasingly problematic issue that leads to millions of deaths every year.

Adapting to the antibiotic medicine means it no longer can kill them or stop their growth. These bacterial infections can become extremely difficult to treat since the options to remove that bacterium are now slimmer. Antibiotic resistance can be caused by overuse, misuse, spontaneous resistance, and transmitted resistance. Taking antibiotics that are not prescribed to you allows naturally resistant bacteria to survive and become "superbugs." Misuse of antibiotics includes forgetting to take one or more antibiotic doses, stopping treatment too soon, or using someone else's medicine. Mutated bacteria become increasingly resistant to medicine.

Whilst drug resistance typically involves microbes chemically inactivating an antimicrobial drug or a cell mechanically stopping the uptake of a drug, another form of drug resistance can arise from the formation of biofilms. Some bacteria are able to form biofilms by adhering to surfaces on implanted devices such as catheters and prostheses and creating an extracellular matrix for other cells to adhere to. This provides them with a stable environment from which the bacteria can disperse and infect other parts of the host. Additionally, the extracellular matrix and dense outer layer of bacterial cells can protect the inner bacteria cells from antimicrobial drugs.

Phage therapy is a technique that was discovered before antibiotics, but fell to the wayside as antibiotics became predominate. It is now being considered as a potential solution to increasing antimicrobial resistance. Bacteriophages, viruses that only infect bacteria, can specifically target the bacteria of interest and inject their genome. This process makes the bacteria halt its own production to make more phages, and this continues until the bacteria lyses itself and releases the phages into the surrounding environment. Phage therapy does not kill microbiota since it is specific, and it can help those with antibiotic allergies. Some drawbacks are that it is a time-intensive process since the specific bacterium needs to be identified. It also does not currently have the body of research supporting its effects and safety that antibiotics do. Bacteria can also eventually become resistant, through systems like CRISPR/Cas9 system. Many clinical trials have been promising though, showing that it could potentially help with the antimicrobial resistance problem. It can also be used in conjunction with antibiotics for a cumulative effect.

Medical microbiology is not only about diagnosing and treating disease, it also involves the study of beneficial microbes. Microbes have been shown to be helpful in combating infectious disease and promoting health. Treatments can be developed from microbes, as demonstrated by Alexander Fleming's discovery of penicillin as well as the development of new antibiotics from the bacterial genus Streptomyces among many others. Not only are microorganisms a source of antibiotics but some may also act as probiotics to provide health benefits to the host, such as providing better gastrointestinal health or inhibiting pathogens.
