= Clinical Microbiology and Infection =

- Discipline: Infectious diseases
- Language: English
- Edited by: Leonard Leibovici

Publication details
- History: 1995–present
- Publisher: Elsevier
- Frequency: Monthly
- Impact factor: 10.9 (2023)

Standard abbreviations
- ISO 4: Clin. Microbiol. Infect.

Indexing
- CODEN: CMINFM
- ISSN: 1198-743X (print); 1469-0691 (web)
- LCCN: sn95050250
- OCLC no.: 223755103

Links
- Journal homepage; Online access; Online archive

Clinical Microbiology and Infection is a monthly peer-reviewed medical journal covering management of patients and the prevention of infectious diseases including research in clinical microbiology, infectious diseases, bacteriology, mycology, virology, and parasitology, including immunology and epidemiology as related to these fields. The journal also publishes editorials, commentaries, and reviews, as well as guidelines originating from European Society of Clinical Microbiology and Infectious Diseases study groups.

The journal was established in 1995 and is published by Elsevier on behalf of the European Society of Clinical Microbiology and Infectious Diseases, of which it is the official journal. The editor-in-chief is Leonard Leibovici (Tel-Aviv University). According to the Journal Citation Reports, the journal has a 2023 impact factor of 10.9.

== Abstracting and indexing ==
The journal is abstracted and indexed in:

- Index Medicus/MEDLINE/PubMed
- Science Citation Index Expanded
- Scopus

== See also ==
- Journal of Clinical Microbiology
- Infection and Immunity
- Lancet Infectious Diseases
