= British Infection Association =

Nonprofit organization in Knutsford, United Kingdom

The British Infection Association (BIA) is a professional association in the United Kingdom that supports professionals within the field of infection.

Registered in the UK, the Association is governed by an elected board of Principle Officers, made up of President, Vice President, Honorary Secretary, Treasurer and Meeting Secretary supported by a wider elected council. BIA serves to support professionals to improve, diagnose, manage and prevent infection through education, advocacy and research and has grown to become a leading authority in the field.

== History ==
The BIA was formed from a merger in November 2009 between the Association of Medical Microbiologists and the British Infection Society (itself a result of the merger of the British Society for the Study of Infection with the Clinical Infection Society in 1998). The BIA was registered under its new name with the Registrar of Companies for Scotland on 12 November 2010.

== Organisation and Aims ==
The organisation has upwards of 1500 members. Full members of the association include consultants, associate specialists and senior academics, but membership options are offered for those in training and non-medically qualified healthcare workers with an interest in infection.

BIA represents infection professional specialists at a high level in the UK through collaboration with the Royal Colleges and work with NHS England and the UK Health Security Agency and other government bodies. It provides multiple educational opportunities each year. They host their own events, are a hosting society of the Federation of Infection Societies Conference, and are an affiliated society of ESCMID Research. Travel grants are awarded on an annual basis, with a focus on infection specialists in the early stages of their careers. The association has produced multiple guidelines and infection quick reference guides to assist infection specialists and others in their practice. BIA publishes two journals, the Journal of Infection and Clinical Infection in Practice.

== Council ==
The BIA Council changes every 2–3 years depending on the term of the roles. The current council is listed on their website.
